= List of Malta-flagged cargo ships =

This list of Malta-flagged cargo ships consists of vessels which are registered in Malta and subject to the laws of that country. Malta is a prolific flag state, largely due to its status as a flag of convenience. A total of 1,196 bulk carriers, container ships, and general cargo ships flew the Maltese flag in 2021. Any ship which flew the flag at any point in its career, and is present in the encyclopedia, is listed here.

== List of ships ==
Name	Owner	Country	Year built	Type	Fate	Notes
Arctic Sea	Arctic Runner Shipping	Russia	1991	General	In Alang, India to be scrapped	
Azov Concord	Albros Shipping & Trading	Turkey	2008	General		
Biruința	Histria Shipmanagement	Romania	1984	Crude tanker		
COSCO Guangzhou	Cosco Ship Management	China	2006	Container ship		
Erika	Total-Fina-Elf	France	1975	Tanker	Sank off the coast of France in 1999, causing a major oil spill	
Histria Agata	Histria Shipmanagement	Romania	2007	Tanker		
Histria Coral	Histria Shipmanagement	Romania	2006	Tanker		
