= Traian Băsescu =

President of Romania from 2004 to 2014

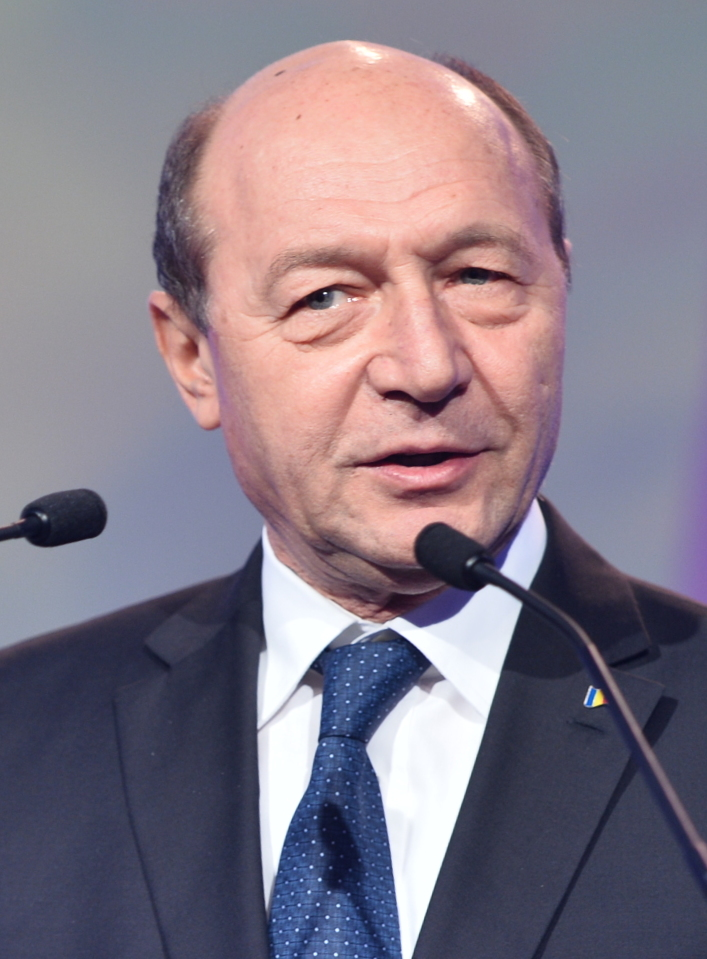
- Băsescu in 2014

President of Romania
- In office 20 December 2004 – 21 December 2014^{[a]}
- Prime Minister: Adrian Năstase; Eugen Bejinariu (acting); Călin Popescu-Tăriceanu; Emil Boc; Cătălin Predoiu (acting); Mihai Răzvan Ungureanu; Victor Ponta
- Preceded by: Ion Iliescu
- Succeeded by: Klaus Iohannis

Member of the European Parliament for Romania
- In office 2 July 2019 – 15 July 2024

Member of the Senate for Bucharest
- In office 20 December 2016 – 19 June 2019

Leader of the People's Movement Party
- In office 27 March 2016 – 16 June 2018
- Preceded by: Eugen Tomac
- Succeeded by: Eugen Tomac

Leader of the Democratic Party
- In office 19 May 2001 – 18 December 2004
- Preceded by: Petre Roman
- Succeeded by: Emil Boc

Mayor of Bucharest
- In office 26 June 2000 – 20 December 2004
- Preceded by: Viorel Lis
- Succeeded by: Adriean Videanu

Minister of Transport
- In office 17 April 1998 – 26 June 2000
- Prime Minister: Radu Vasile; Alexandru Athanasiu (Acting); Mugur Isărescu
- Preceded by: Anton Ionescu
- Succeeded by: Anca Boagiu
- In office 12 December 1996 – 11 February 1998
- Prime Minister: Victor Ciorbea
- Preceded by: Aurel Novac
- Succeeded by: Anton Ionescu
- In office 30 April 1991 – 19 November 1992
- Prime Minister: Petre Roman; Theodor Stolojan
- Preceded by: Doru Pană
- Succeeded by: Paul Teodoru

Member of the Chamber of Deputies from Vaslui County
- In office October 1992 – 14 November 2000

Personal details
- Born: 4 November 1951 (age 74) Basarabi, Romania (now Murfatlar)
- Citizenship: Romania; Moldova (2016–17) and (from 2026)
- Party: People's Movement Party (2015–present)
- Other political affiliations: Romanian Communist Party (Before 1989); National Salvation Front (1989–1993); Democratic Party (1993–2004); Independent (2004–2014, PD/PDL membership suspended while president)
- Spouse: Maria Andrușca (m. 1975)
- Children: 2, including Elena
- Education: Mircea cel Bătrân Naval Academy
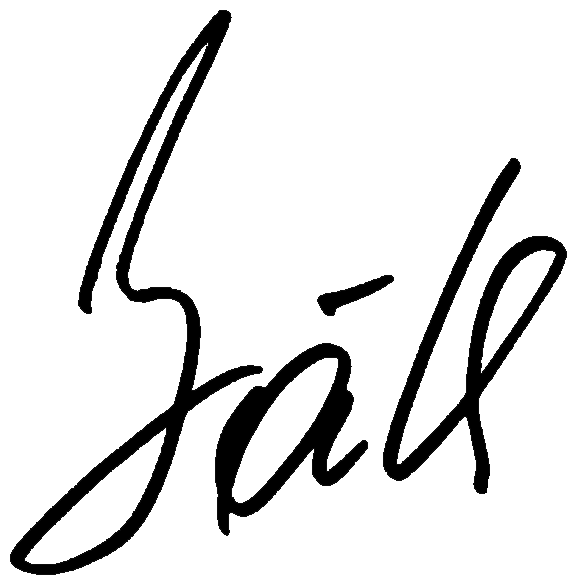
- Signature
- a. Suspended from 20 April 2007 – 23 May 2007 (Nicolae Văcăroiu as acting president) and from 10 July 2012 – 28 August 2012 (Crin Antonescu as acting president).

Traian Băsescu (Note: Romanian pronunciation: [traˈjan bəˈsesku]) (born 4 November 1951) is a Romanian politician who served as the president of Romania from 2004 to 2014. Prior to his presidency, Băsescu served as Romanian minister of transport on multiple occasions between 1991 and 2000, and as Mayor of Bucharest from 2000 to 2004. Additionally, he was elected as leader of the Democratic Party (PD) in 2001.

During his term as leader of the PD, the party formed the Justice and Truth Alliance (DA) with the National Liberal Party (PNL). Following Theodor Stolojan's withdrawal from the presidential elections in 2004, Băsescu entered the presidential race on behalf of the alliance. After being elected president, he suspended his PD membership; Romanian law does not permit the incumbent president to be a member of a political party. He was subsequently re-elected in 2009.

During his presidency, Romania became a member state of the European Union, on January 1, 2007, after the admission process formarly ended in 2004, during the presidency of his predecessor, Ion Iliescu. He is the only president of Romania to have been suspended by the parliament twice, in 2007 and 2012. A former member of the Romanian Communist Party (PCR), he has promoted social conservative, neoliberal and populist policies during his administration.

After ending his presidential term, in 2015, Băsescu joined the People's Movement Party (PMP), of which he became president in 2016, subsequently resigning in 2018. He then served as Member of the European Parliament for Romania between 2019 and 2024.

== Early life ==
Traian Băsescu was born in Basarabi (renamed Murfatlar in 2007), near the port city of Constanța, the largest Romanian port on the coast of the Black Sea. Băsescu's father, Dumitru (1924–2002), was a retired army officer, whilst his mother, Elena (1929–2010) was an ordinary peasant or homemaker who died of breast cancer. His brother, Mircea (born 1953) was charged with influence peddling (in exchange for €250,000, he promised freedom to his godson Florin Anghel, an underworld member); Mircea was sentenced to four years in prison only after his brother's mandate ended. Băsescu and his wife Maria have two daughters: Ioana (born 1977), a notary, and Elena (born 1980), a Romanian former MEP.

== Professional career ==
Băsescu graduated from the Naval Institute of Constanța in 1976 and became a merchant marine deck officer at Navrom, the Romanian state-owned shipping company. Between 1981 and 1987, he served as captain on Romanian commercial ships. Throughout his career, questions have been raised about Băsescu's links to the Securitate, the security services of the communist leader Nicolae Ceaușescu. However, Băsescu has claimed that his links with the former Securitate were minimal, though some contact was obligatory at the time for somebody working abroad in a senior position. In 1984, he was promoted to Captain of the oil tanker Biruința, the largest ship of the then Romanian commercial fleet. In 1989, Băsescu moved to Belgium to head the Navrom Agency in Antwerp.

The most controversial episode of his professional career began on 10 September 1981 in the French port Rouen, when a fire started around the Romanian tanker Argeș, then under the command of Traian Băsescu, affecting a large portion of the Seine River. The fire destroyed two tugs and six barges, and major disaster was avoided when 70 French firemen from Rouen, Grand-Couronne, Grand-Quevilly, Canteleu, and Moulineaux prevented the fire from reaching the nearby Shell refinery. According to an interview given by Băsescu to the Romanian TV channel Prima TV on 23 June 1998 (and quoted by Magazin Nautic, the official publication of the Romanian Nautical Club), Băsescu admitted to having made alterations to the ship's installation before the French investigators were allowed to come on board, a thing that — in Băsescu's own words — made it impossible for the investigators to link the cause of the disaster to the Romanian ship.

== Earlier political career ==
Băsescu was a member of the Communist Party before 1989. After the downfall of Communism, he claimed that he joined the PCR to promote his career in the merchant marines. In a letter published in Romanian newspapers, former president Emil Constantinescu alleged that Băsescu was in the second tier of the Communist Party leadership during the regime of former communist leader Nicolae Ceaușescu, but had managed to portray himself as anti-communist. During an interview, Băsescu admitted that before 1989 he smuggled jeans and other goods. A former communist official, a director of a firm that was receiving the goods transported by Băsescu by ship, said on Antena 3 TV that without payment of a bribe, Băsescu refused to bring the goods in the country.

Băsescu entered politics after the 1989 Romanian Revolution, as a member of the large National Salvation Front (FSN) party.

== Political career ==
=== Minister of Transport ===
In April 1991, he became minister of transport in Petre Roman's Cabinet, and continued to hold this position during Theodor Stolojan's "Cabinet of technocrats" between September 1991 and November 1992. In 1992, after the FSN split into two factions—the Social Democratic Party of Romania (PDSR, later PSD), led by Ion Iliescu, and the Democratic Party (PD), led by Petre Roman, Băsescu joined the PD faction. In 1992, he was elected to the lower house of the Romanian Parliament, the Chamber of Deputies, then re-elected for the 1996–2000 term.

Concurrently with his second term in Parliament, from November 1996 to June 2000, Băsescu also served as minister of transport in the center-right governments of Victor Ciorbea, Radu Vasile, and Mugur Isărescu.

In December 1997, he gave an interview to Claudiu Săftoiu of the newspaper Evenimentul Zilei, in which he accused Prime Minister Victor Ciorbea of not implementing enough reforms, although Ciorbea was accused by the Socialist opposition of being excessively reformist. This became the first episode in an open dispute within the ruling center-right coalition, a dispute that eventually led to Democratic Party ministers, including Băsescu, resigning from the cabinet, which, in turn, led to Ciorbea's resignation. Subsequently, in 1998, Băsescu resumed his previous ministerial position in the new cabinet headed by Radu Vasile.

During his tenure as minister of transportation, Băsescu oversaw the privatisation of Romania's merchant fleet. While some argued that the aging ships at the time were of minimal value, many Romanians believed the compensation received for the ships was artificially low. The "scandal" of the fleet sale became known in Romania as The Fleet File (Dosarul Flota) Affair. Prosecutors brought charges against Băsescu, but it was not proven that he was involved in any malfeasance. In 1996, Băsescu was the first Romanian parliamentarian to renounce his parliamentary immunity, in order to allow judicial procedures related to the Fleet File Affair to continue against him. (Romanian MPs were, by default, granted immunity from prosecution of any kind.) Although the case against him was closed at the time for lack of evidence, it was reopened in early 2004, in what some considered a political maneuver against him sponsored by the then PSD government. In 2004, the case was brought before the High Court of Cassation and Justice, however, the judges decided to send it back to the Prosecutor's Office citing procedural errors (the signature of a prosecutor was missing). In December 2007, the Romanian National Anti-corruption Directorate (Direcția Națională Anticorupție), a subdivision of the General Prosecutor Office, decided to end the investigation, based on the opinion of financial expertise that there was no prejudicial dealing by the Romanian association NM Petromin SA Constanța with the Norwegian Torvald Klaveness Group between April 1991 and August 2000. However, the case is still open as this is only the latest published opinion, and the only one that serves as evidence in favor of Băsescu. Some have seen this as a political maneuver destined to prove his innocence. In total 136 people were investigated. 80, including Băsescu, were retained for the investigation of this case, while the facts pertaining to 51 others were separated for independent investigations.

=== Mayor of Bucharest ===
In 2000, Băsescu was elected mayor of Bucharest, winning the run-off against Social Democratic Party (PDSR) candidate Sorin Oprescu by a slim margin (50.69% to 49.31%), despite trailing him by 24% in the first round.

As mayor, he was credited with a reduction in the number of stray dogs roaming freely through the streets of the city, from approximately 300,000 in 2000 to 25,000 in 2004, and thus reducing the number of dog bite injuries from 1,500 a month to under 200 a month. This campaign was controversial, as many opposed large-scale dog euthanasia. On the other hand, there were also numerous cases of people asking the authorities to take the stray dogs away, but after this was done, neighbors, who had been feeding the dogs, would show up at the shelter to take them back to their neighborhoods. The campaign resulted in nearly 48,000 dogs being put down in 2001, with reduced numbers in the following years. In 2004, Băsescu called the campaign a success. Băsescu also claimed success in improvements to the city's water and lighting systems, which were in a very bad state, as well as modernizing the city's public transportation system.

However, his tenure was marked by constant conflicts with the governing Social Democratic Party (PSD)-controlled institutions. Citing the need for decentralization, the central government led by Adrian Năstase passed several ordinances transferring powers from the city mayor to mayors of the city's six sectors, and to the city council. Băsescu accused council members of corruption and obstruction; he also successfully challenged several council resolutions in Administrative Courts. As a consequence, on 10 January 2002, the central government decided to dissolve the council, yet it later annulled that decision. These conflicts led to the blocking or delay of several infrastructure loans, financed by the European Investment Bank (BEI) for municipal heating and road networks, and to the blocking the city's ability to borrow and finance reconstruction.

In February 2003, Băsescu bought a 369 m^{2} (3,972 sq ft) apartment from the state in a nationalized house downtown Bucharest for the equivalent of US$19,000. A scandal followed, as the request to buy the house was approved by the mayor's office, at a time when Băsescu was mayor. He explained that he had filed an application in October 2002 with the specialized state agency (not to the mayor's office, which was not the owner of the building) for the apartment to be sold to him on the basis of the Romanian Law 10 of 2001, which he claimed "gives priority to existing tenants to buy previously nationalized houses, no matter whether they already owned other houses," and that the price was calculated based on a 1995 law. However, the press noted that, according to the contract, the sale was based on Law 112 of 1995, and that Law 10/2001 had no provisions about selling anything. The 1995 law prevents, with the provisions of Art. 9, sale to tenants who already owned or sold a house after 1 January 1990. Băsescu already bought a villa near Bucharest in October 2002, which he donated to his daughter shortly after. Furthermore, the same law only gave the right to buy the nationalized houses to those who were tenants at the time of it came into force (i.e. the second half of 1996), while Băsescu had only lived in that house since August 2002. According to the press, these facts made it impossible for Băsescu to legally buy the apartment. When the scandal broke again in early 2005, Băsescu first stated that he would give up the apartment, but later changed his mind announcing that he would give it up only if the Prosecutor's Office decided he had broken the law. The prosecutors investigating the matter concluded that, according to the provisions of the law, Băsescu did not breach it when he bought the apartment.

=== Leader of Justice and Truth Alliance (D.A.) ===
In 2001, Băsescu was elected chairman of the Democratic Party (PD), defeating Petre Roman, who had previously led the party for nine years, after Roman only managed to get 3% of the vote at the 2000 presidential elections. At the time, the PD had a social-democrat ideology. That same year, Băsescu's party and Iliescu's PDSR both attempted to join the Socialist International. Băsescu tried to present his party as more democratically oriented, stating that the "PDSR is far from modern social-democracy". He also negotiated a merger with Virgil Măgureanu's PNR, a party that had many former Securitate employees.

In 2003, Băsescu negotiated an electoral alliance for the PD with the PNL in order to create a cohesive opposition against the then-ruling PSD. The new pact, called the Justice and Truth Alliance (Romanian: Alianța Dreptate și Adevăr), ran common candidates in local and national elections, and agreed to vote as a bloc in Parliament. As chairman of PD, he became a co-chairman of the Justice and Truth Alliance alongside the then PNL chairman Theodor Stolojan. In 2003, Stolojan, who was the Justice and Truth candidate for president of Romania in 2004, stepped down as PNL chairman and Justice and Truth co-chairman, and was replaced in these positions by Călin Popescu-Tăriceanu. Although it was announced that Stolojan had withdrawn because of health concerns, Băsescu claimed to the press that the reason behind this decision was blackmail by political opponents (Stolojan did not confirm this). This sudden change in leadership of the DA alliance transformed the 2004 presidential election to a race between two leaders of parties affiliated with the Socialist International. Editorialist Dan Pavel decried the development as a "marginalization of the right," and the presidential race as a choice between two former "FSN cadres". Nevertheless, there were significant differences in the economic programs of the DA alliance and the PSD in 2004. The DA alliance leaned towards economic liberalism, with the introduction of a 16% flat tax that replaced the progressive personal income tax of up to 40%, and the 25% corporate tax. In January 2005, the Financial Times described the DA alliance as "centrist".

Băsescu's party would not officially abandon social-democrat ideals until 2005, after PD's leadership was unhappy with the support given by the Socialist International to the PDSR during the 2004 elections, and by the fact that the Socialist International admitted the PDSR's successor, PSD, with full membership rights, while the PD remained only an associate member. In a 2006 interview, Băsescu stated that his party's exit from the Socialist International was a "huge concession" he made to PNL after discussions of a merger of PD and PNL began in 2004. A change in the leadership of PNL prevented the merger; according to Băsescu, most of the PNL leaders who negotiated the joint governance with Băsescu in 2004 had been marginalized by 2006, making collaboration difficult. In December 2006, those members of the PNL who favored closer ties with Băsescu formed their own party, the Liberal Democratic Party (PLD), which eventually merged with the PD in January 2008. After December 2006, the remainder of the PNL became hostile to Băsescu and formed a minority government supported by the PSD, effectively marking the end of the DA alliance. (See Conflict with Prime Minister Tăriceanu below for further details.)

== Presidential campaign ==
=== 2004 Presidential campaign ===
Following Theodor Stolojan's surprise withdrawal from the 2004 presidential elections, Băsescu entered the presidential race on behalf of the Justice and Truth Alliance. His main opponent was then prime minister and PSD president Adrian Năstase. Like Băsescu, Năstase was a former Communist Party member. Although Năstase came out ahead in the first round by 7%, Băsescu achieved a surprise comeback, and won the 12 December run-off election by a 2.46% margin, receiving 51.23% of the vote. Băsescu won the presidential election by using anti-communist and anti-corruption rhetoric. In the live TV debate with Adrian Năstase before the 2004 run-off presidential election, Băsescu caught his opponent off-guard with a rhetorical remark: "You know what Romania's greatest curse is right now? It's that Romanians have to choose between two former Communist Party members."

During the 2004 presidential campaign, before a TV interview with Adrian Năstase, Băsescu gave him a paper and told him: "Put it in your pocket and read it when you are away!" Similarly, in June 2006, at the oath-taking ceremony of Radu Stroe as the new secretary general of the Government, Băsescu gave him a sheet of paper as a "gift". After seeing it, Stroe went pale and refused to make its contents public. When asked, Băsescu said its contents were not classified. Both Adrian Năstase and Radu Stroe were previously involved in corruption scandals.

=== 2009 Presidential campaign ===
Băsescu ran for a second term in the 2009 presidential elections. Incumbent Băsescu and his Social-Democrat opponent Mircea Geoană offered different ways to tackle the economic crisis. Băsescu pledged to cut public spending and promised "more equity" to people living in the countryside.

Băsescu tried to portray himself as the champion of the people against what he called the "corrupt political elite". A widely used election poster carried the text: "They cannot avoid what they are afraid of." Băsescu's opponents countered that he is part of that elite, simply with different backers. In a Cluj-Napoca meeting with his supporters he claimed that he "was the one to stop doubtful privatisations," implicitly accusing rival Social-Democrats of underhand practices while in power. He vowed to fight against the Parliament, which blocked his bid to install the Croitoru cabinet, and the "media moguls". In the campaign for the first round, his favourite campaign theme was reducing the number of lawmakers. This theme proved popular, with the majority of the electorate voting for the reduction of the number of lawmakers from a current 471 to a maximum of 300, and in favour of a transition from the current bicameral Parliament to a unicameral one in a referendum held simultaneously with the first round of elections.

In the first round, held on 22 November, Băsescu came first with 32.44% of the votes, and Geoană second with 31.15%. Although Băsescu claimed the results of the first round as "a significant vote for the right" because he and Crin Antonescu together received over 50% of the vote, the next day Antonescu refused to back Băsescu in the runoff, and shortly thereafter announced an alliance with Geoană. Subsequently, Băsescu reproached Antonescu for having "thrown himself in the arms of the Social-Democrat party, a party opposed to reforms," and added "This alliance will bring us back to 20 years ago when the PSD was controlling all state institutions." Antonescu in turn called Băsescu "a demagogue and a populist," and vowed to support Geoană as "the lesser of two evils".

On 26 November 2009, footage from the 2004 election campaign showing Băsescu apparently hitting or pushing a 10-year-old boy at a campaign rally was broadcast. The press, unfavorable to Băsescu, interpreted the footage as "hitting with his fist," whereas the press favorable to him either interpreted it as a push, or called the footage fake. Asked in a talk show about the incident, the president stated that he did not recall it, but did not outright deny it either, saying that perhaps the child uttered profanity. Later, he made a public declaration that "never in his life has he hit a child," but he refused to comment on whether the footage was manipulated video or not. PDL member Roberta Anastase, who had accompanied Băsescu during the rally, declared the child uttered profanity, and that Băsescu pushed the child aside. The footage was released within 24 hours of a declaration by Dinu Patriciu, also present at the rally, who claimed that he saw Băsescu hitting a child in 2004. The boy has been identified, and was interviewed later that night. He acknowledged that Băsescu had hit him after he chanted a slogan favourable to Ion Iliescu and Adrian Năstase, but said he was not physically hurt. He also said that for the moment he was happy that Băsescu had paid attention to him, and they smiled at each other, but later he felt disappointed. He added "it was a hit as if he wanted to say: go away!" On 27 November Băsescu told a Mediafax journalist that he saw the footage "de-mounted on computer," suggesting it was manipulated. Cecilia Gheorghe, the boy's aunt, declared that the child now refuses to give further details because he is now "afraid for his life and that of his mother".

In the second round of the presidential election Băsescu won against Geoana by 50.3% to 49.7%. The opposition's legal objection to their narrow defeat was dismissed.

== Presidency (2004–2014) ==
Presidential styles of Traian Băsescu
- Reference style: Președintele (President)
- Spoken style: Președintele (President)
- Alternative style: Domnia Sa/Excelența Sa (His Excellency)

Running on a strong reform and anti-corruption platform, Băsescu's victory was characterized in the media as Romania's "Orange Revolution", in reference to the reformists' perceived victory in neighbouring Ukraine during the same period, and in reference to the orange colour used by the winning Justice and Truth Alliance (DA). Upon taking office, he suspended his PD membership; the Constitution does not allow the president to be a formal member of a political party during his tenure.

In line with an agreement between the PD and PNL, he appointed PNL leader Popescu-Tăriceanu as prime minister. In order to form a majority, PNL and PD formed a coalition with the Democratic Alliance of Hungarians in Romania and the Humanist Party, which later changed its name to the Conservative Party (PC). While the platform of the former has been generally in line with that of the Justice and Truth Alliance, the latter (PC) was needed in the coalition in order to obtain more than 50% of the seats in Parliament, because, apart from the opposition Social-Democrat Party, many seats were held by the ultra-nationalist Greater Romania Party (PRM).

In late 2006, the PC withdrew from the cabinet, a move at least partially related to conflicts between Băsescu and PC leader Dan Voiculescu. The withdrawal of the PC left the coalition without a majority in the Parliament.

=== Domestic policy ===
In domestic politics, Băsescu has often claimed he fights against high-level corruption. In spring 2005, Romania resolved a hostage crisis in Iraq involving three Romanian journalists and their guide.

In 2005, he also focused on pressing the government to provide relief to thousands of Romanians left homeless by widespread flooding throughout the spring and summer.

On 18 December 2006, Băsescu delivered a speech to Parliament (broadcast live on TV) in which he condemned Romania's pre-1989 communist regime. Some members of the opposition, mainly of the ultra-nationalist PRM, and some members of the mainstream Social Democratic Party, tried to disturb the speech. Particularly vocal was the ultra-nationalist PRM leader Corneliu Vadim Tudor, who walked with posters on the floor of Parliament, whistled and interrupted Băsescu's speech several times.

=== Foreign policy ===
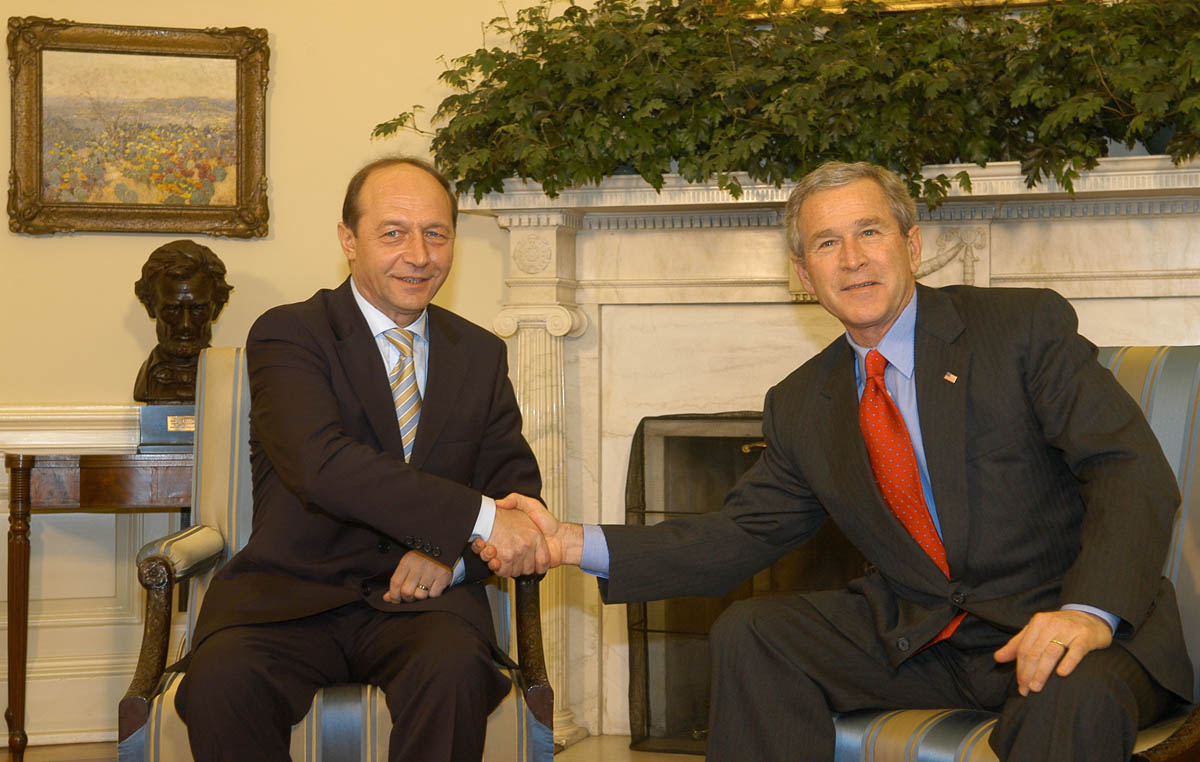
Traian Băsescu with George W. Bush

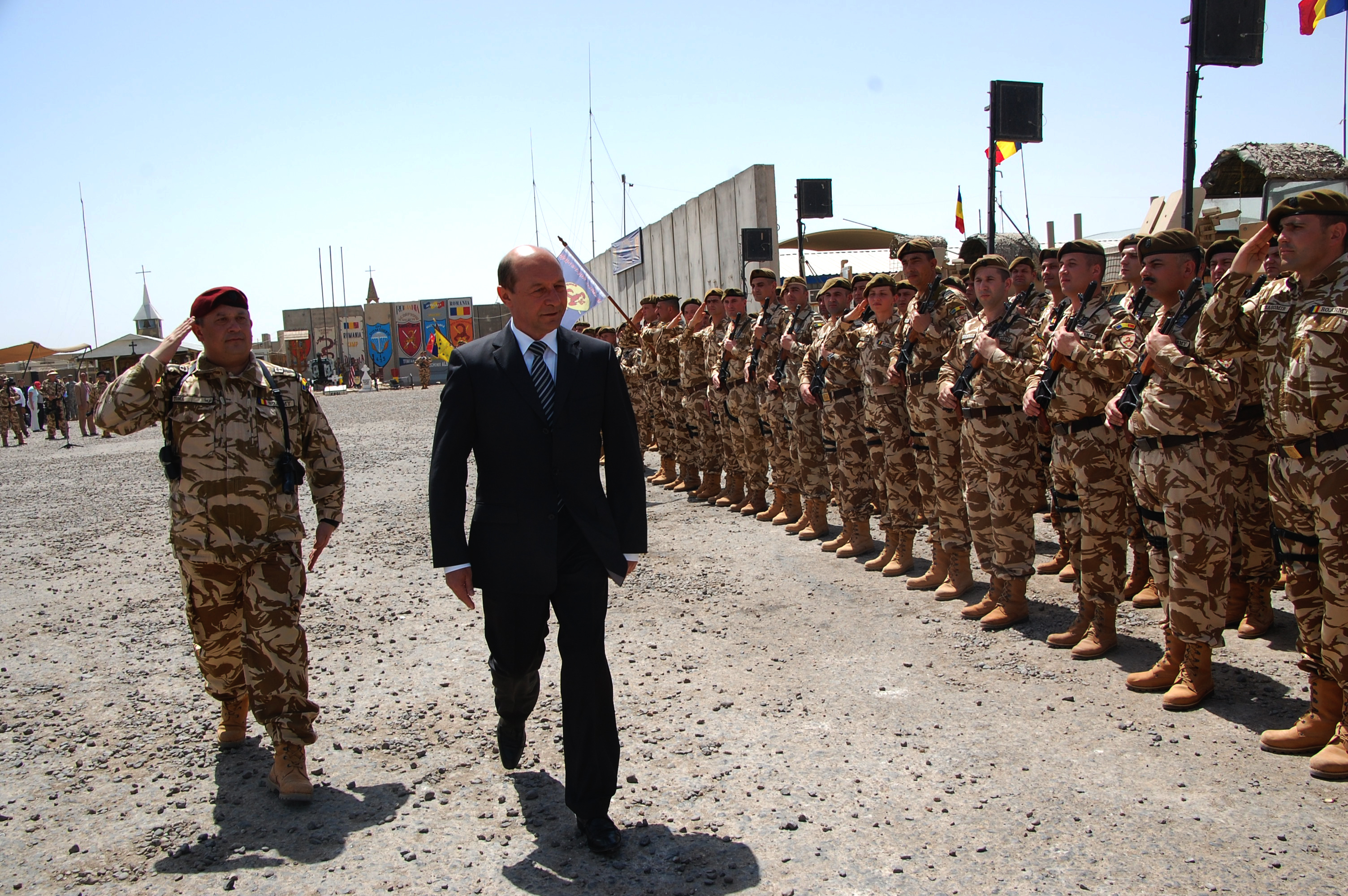
Traian Băsescu in Iraq, June 2009

Băsescu repeatedly stated that Romania's accession to the European Union remained a top priority, and he was president when the country acceded on 1 January 2007. Both the president and the government of Prime Minister Popescu-Tăriceanu focused on Romania's planned accession to the EU, which remained a central component in Romania's foreign policy.

In addition, Băsescu has focused on a strong strategic partnership with the United States, a relationship which, during the 2004 presidential campaign, he called the "Bucharest-London-Washington axis". In real terms, this meant a continued commitment to maintain Romanian troops in Afghanistan and a smaller contingent in Iraq, and an agreement signed in December 2005 between Romania and the U.S. to allow U.S. troops to use a Romanian military facility. Băsescu is singled out in a report by Dick Marty, an investigator of the Council of Europe, on illegal activities of the US CIA in Europe, as one of the persons who authorized, or at least knew about, and must stand accountable for the black site at the Mihail Kogălniceanu military base from 2003 to 2005. Băsescu made strong ties with the President of the United States, who in return called him a friend: "The President and I are friends. Romania and the United States are friends, and we're allies."

In June 2006, Băsescu came into open conflict with Popescu-Tăriceanu after the prime minister and the defence minister announced that they and the PNL sought to withdraw Romania's troops from Iraq. However, the troops remained in Iraq after Băsescu called a meeting of the Supreme Defense Council, which voted for the troops to stay.

In July 2006, Băsescu voiced concern over the 2006 Lebanon War. Băsescu said in a press conference that: "We recognize Israel's right to security but it has generated a humanitarian crisis".

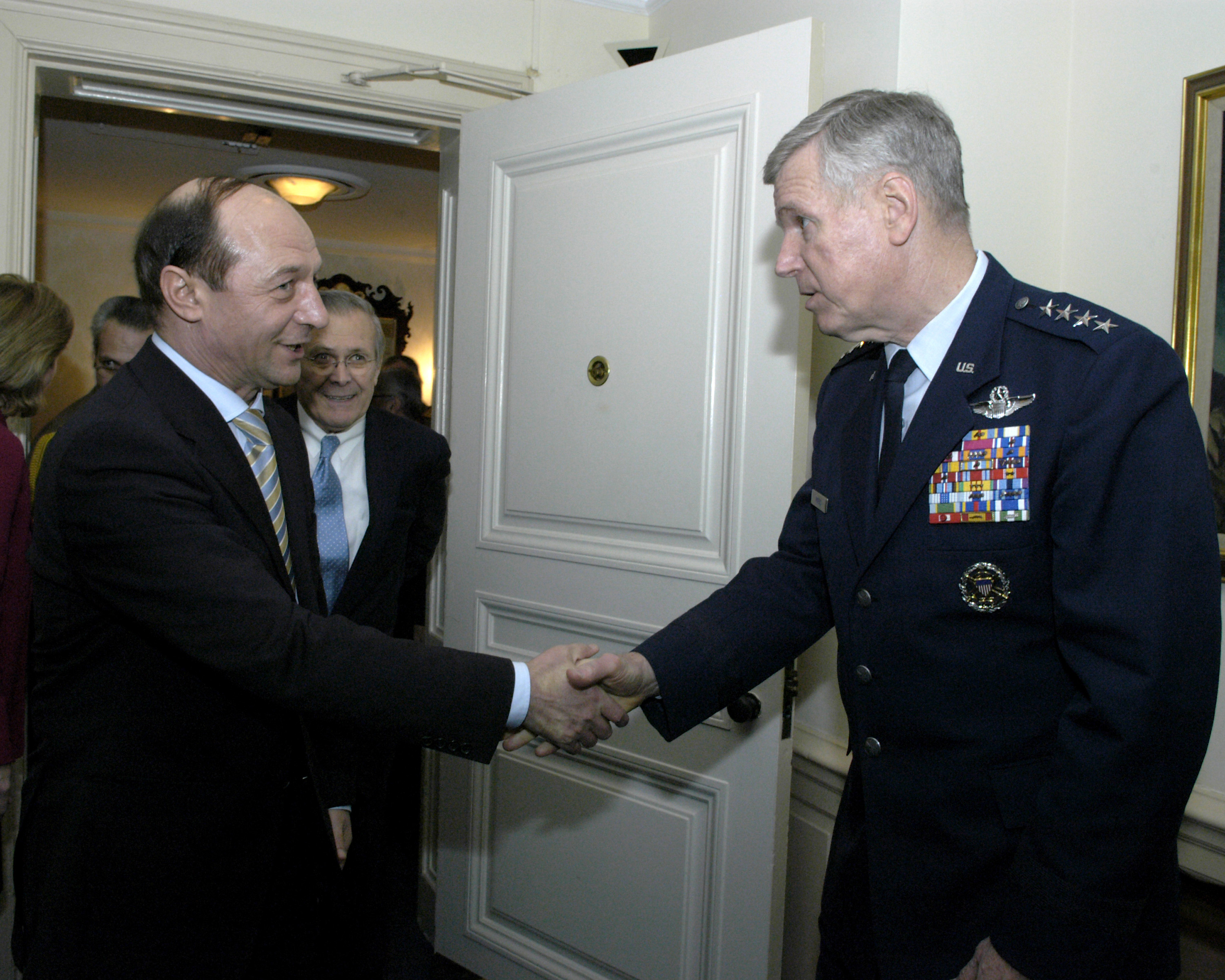
Traian Basescu with U.S. Chairman of the Joint Chiefs of Staff Gen. Richard B. Myers during a visit to The Pentagon on 9 March 2005

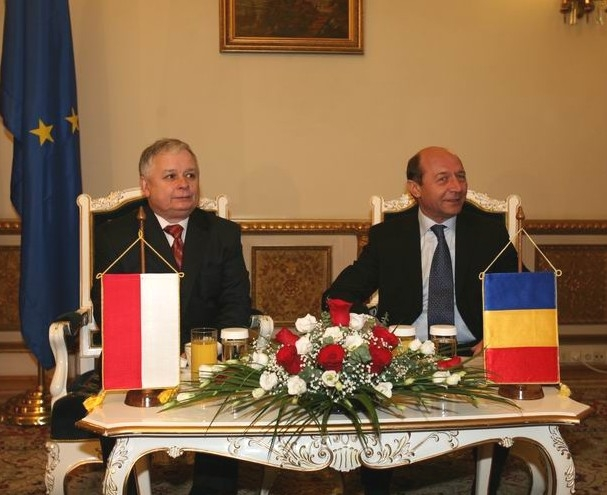
Traian Băsescu with Polish president Lech Kaczyński in February 2007

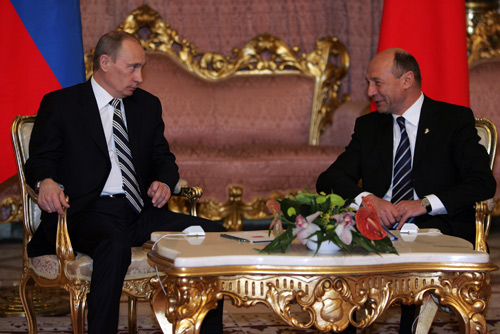
Romanian president Traian Băsescu and Russian President Vladimir Putin, before NATO summit, in Bucharest, on 4 April 2008

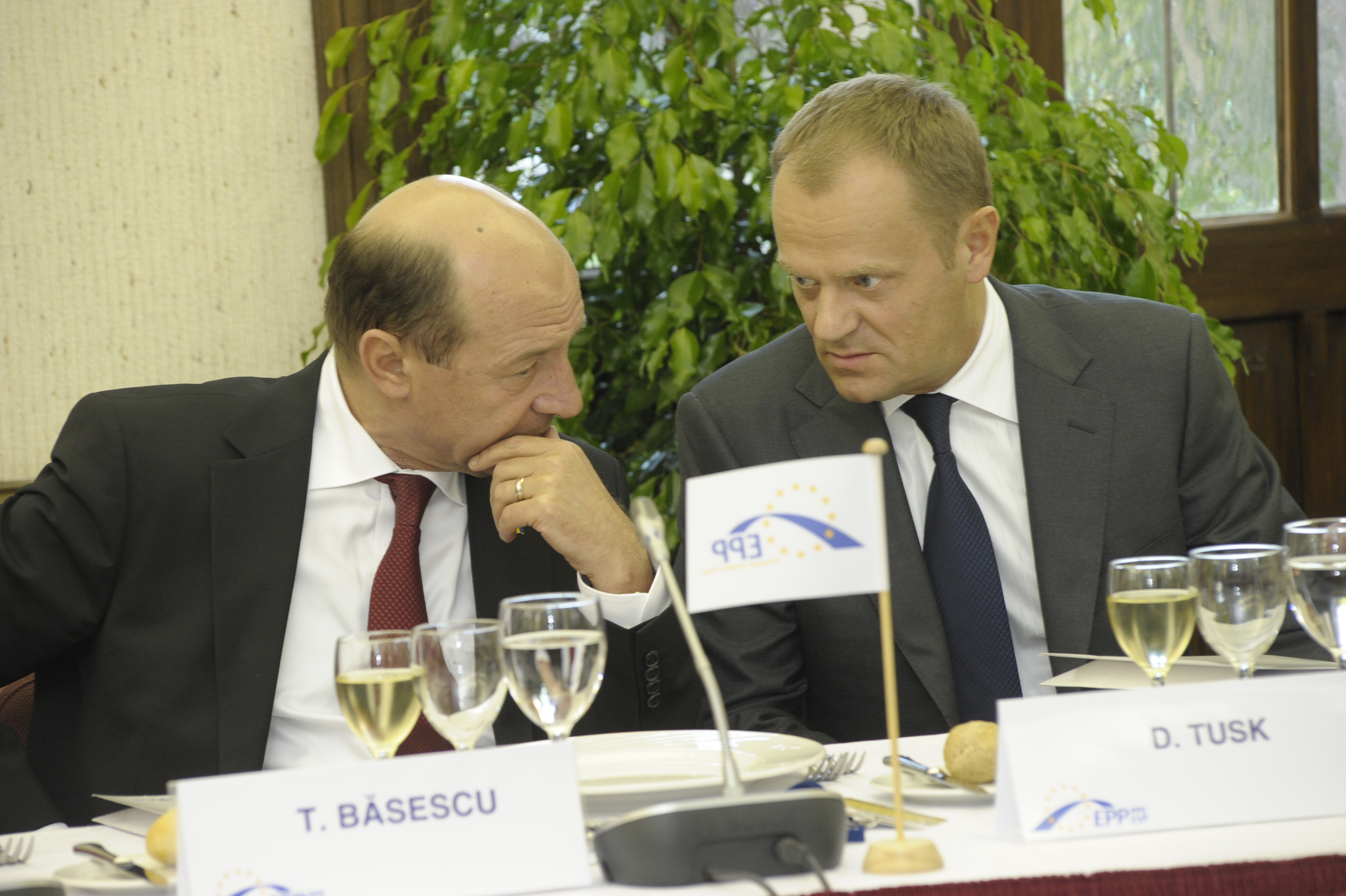
Traian Băsescu and Polish prime minister Donald Tusk during the EPP summit of 2010

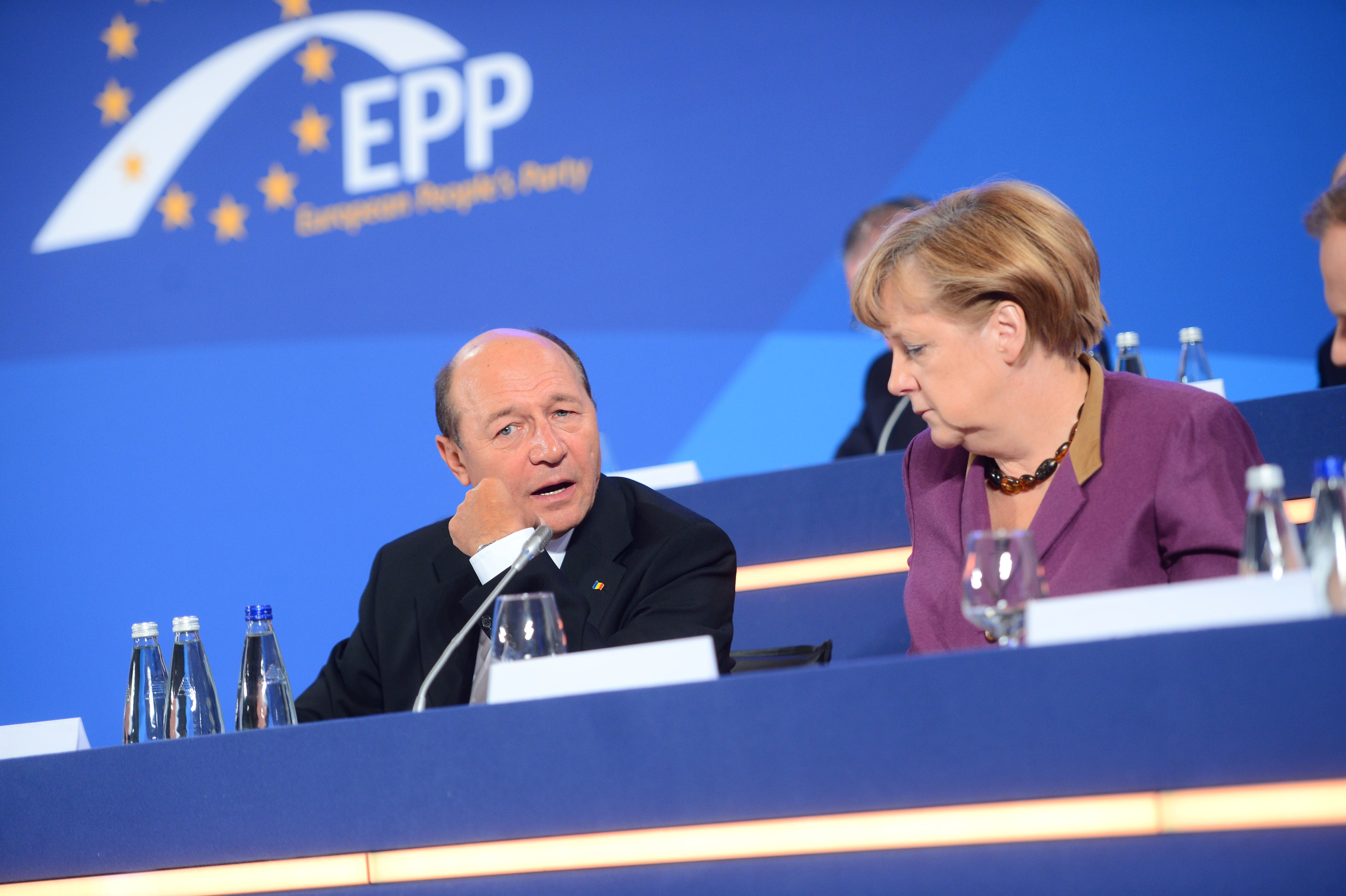
Traian Băsescu and German chancellor Angela Merkel during the EPP summit of 2012

Băsescu has been vocal in calling for a regional approach to security in the Black Sea basin, which he noted remained susceptible to trans-border security threats such as drug and human trafficking. Băsescu alleged "that Russia might have been involved in his suspension," citing his pro-Western foreign policy as a reason.

Băsescu has tried to improve Romania's relations with Moldova. Furthermore, he has expressed his belief several times in the future unification of the two countries, either politically or in the framework of the European Union. His attitude has brought some practical success, but also led to an increase in anti-Romanian rhetoric from the Communist government of Moldova, under Vladimir Voronin. A divisive issue that remains to this day is the opening of two Romanian consulates outside the capital of Moldova, as well as 900,000 Moldovans applying for Romanian citizenship. In both cases, Băsescu strongly supported moves to strengthen relations with Moldova, while the Moldovan Communist leadership sought to cool Băsescu's enthusiasm.

In June 2016, Moldovan president Nicolae Timofti signed a decree granting Băsescu and his wife Maria citizenship. The following January, Timofti's successor Igor Dodon signed a decree that withdrawed Băsescu's citizenship.

Băsescu stated that Romania regards Kosovo as an integral part of Serbia, as an outcome of the Kosovo status process, and that Romania will not recognize any unilateral declaration of independence by Kosovo.

Romania formally terminated its mission in Iraq on 4 June 2009, and pulled out its troops. On 23 July the last Romanian soldiers left Iraq. Three Romanian soldiers had been killed during the mission, and at least eight were wounded.

=== Conflict with Prime Minister Tăriceanu ===
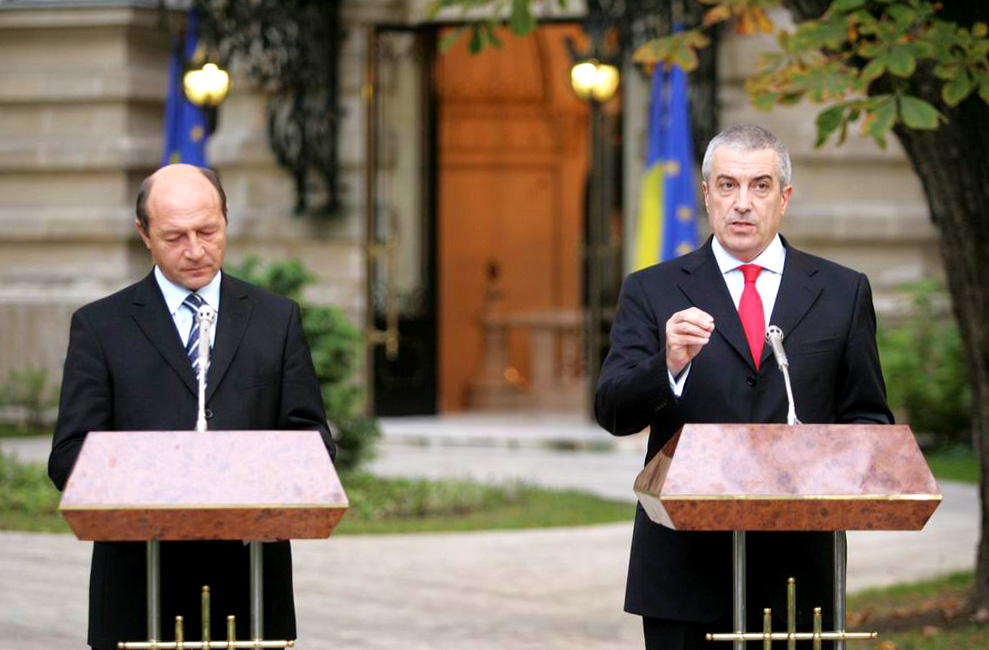
Traian Băsescu and Călin Popescu-Tăriceanu in October 2005

Băsescu continued to be rather popular due to his open style and hands-on approach. In his electoral campaign, he promised to be a președinte jucător (in Romanian), "player-president", in contrast to a more withdrawn president who would be just a mediator among political forces (thus creating in the eyes of some a juridical conflict of a constitutional nature). After he became president, as legally required, he resigned from the Democratic Party (PD). However, he remained very involved in day-to-day politics of Romania, often being accused by other political leaders of overstepping constitutional boundaries on the role of the president. During the course of his presidency, his relations with Popescu-Tăriceanu gradually soured, particularly following the prime minister's reversal of course in July 2005 after Tăriceanu initially announced he would resign causing early parliamentary elections, which some hoped would have resulted in the Justice and Truth Alliance governing alone. The ensuing poor relations between the president and the prime minister have become one of the primary themes of Romanian post-2004 politics, with many unrelated disputes converging towards this dichotomy. Under the Romanian Constitution, the president appoints the prime minister, but does not have the authority to dismiss him.

On 11 January 2007, Băsescu presided over the first half of the meeting of the Consiliul Suprem al Magistraturii (CSM; Superior Council of the Magistracy) at which the election of its new president took place. Before the candidacies were announced, Băsescu publicly said to judge Anton Pandrea: "I heard you have announced your candidacy, Mr. Pandrea. I wish you great success." His former counselor Renate Weber later claimed that if Băsescu had not said those words, Pandrea might not have been elected: "If the President hadn't said that, it would have been another candidacy, if not another President." When asked by the press, Băsescu responded to this criticism with: "I made a mistake, I made a mistake."

A public scandal broke out when Elena Udrea, a presidential adviser, revealed to the press that then-Prime Minister Tăriceanu passed to Băsescu a "scandalous" written note. When the matter became public debate, Băsescu stated about the note: "The Prime Minister proposed to me a partnership, one, unfortunately, with our oligarchies." The note, written by the hand of the Prime Minister, was attached on top of a report from the Petromidia company, then under investigation by Prosecutors, and asked the President to "talk about it" during a scheduled visit at the Prosecutor's Office. Băsescu stated: "Such type of partnership was unacceptable to me ... it would have meant that nothing had changed in Romania after the elections." On the subsequent reaction of the Prime Minister, Băsescu said: "The Prime Minister was consequent. and absolutely not naïve." According to Băsescu, Tăriceanu phoned the Prosecutor General of Romania, then tried to put further pressure through a specially dedicated speech to the Parliament on 8 November 2006, and tried "the same thing" with Justice Minister Monica Macovei, arranging a meeting with a businessman at the Government Palace.

In response, the Prime Minister declared that the matter was just an attempt to hide "what is going on at Cotroceni and around it," and publicly accused Băsescu of facilitating contracts to companies "close to him". According to the Prime Minister, the newly appointed PD Transportation Minister told a businessman: "The President sent me to take care of you." He also stated that Băsescu wanted to put the Department for Administration of State Heritage and Protocol under the control of the family of Elena Udrea. Băsescu immediately asked Tăriceanu to produce evidence to support his claims, to send it to the Prosecutor's Office, and to remove the ministers allegedly involved. "If the Prime Minister does not produce such proof, the President considers that these statements are without substance and are of such a nature as to distract the public attention from his own deed," a presidential communiqué stated.

Dinu Patriciu, an influential businessman and PNL member, stated on a public TV station that, in his opinion, Tăriceanu's note was a "friendly gesture, a sign of normality". Patriciu also said that in a discussion with Băsescu in October 2005, he was advised to invest in any country in the Black Sea basin except Russia. According to Patriciu, Băsescu said " ... because we must do so that Russians invest in Romania, in order to have them hostages, because we certainly will have a conflict with Russia".

Furthermore, Dan Voiculescu, a member of the opposition, accused the president of influence peddling, producing a note by Băsescu to a minister, which, as Voiculescu claimed, was a request to support selling cheap energy to the ALRO company, in which PDL leader Theodor Stolojan was a stockholder. The note said: "Minister Seres, I ask you to analyze this letter and take measures according to Government's interests and, if possible, with the interest of national economy in mind."

The daily newspaper Adevărul published another note, in which the President requested the PD Transport Minister to analyze and find a "legal solution" to a petition from a company close to Băsescu. The newspaper claimed that this was outside the legal prerogatives of the president, and accused Băsescu of sending the note directly to the minister instead of following the usual administrative procedures, and furthermore noted that the matter was a commercial dispute that neither the president nor the transport minister had the legal means to solve.

In the spring of 2007, when Foreign Minister Mihai-Răzvan Ungureanu resigned, Băsescu refused to accept Prime-Minister Tăriceanu's nomination of Adrian Cioroianu as the country's new minister of foreign affairs, claiming that Cioroianu did not have enough experience. On 5 April 2007, the Constitutional Court decided that "The Romanian President doesn't have veto power, but, if he observes that the proposed person does not correspond to the legal conditions required to be a member of Government, he can ask the Prime Minister to renounce his proposal." On the same day (two months after Ungureanu announced his resignation and 17 days after Ungureanu's resignation was accepted by the president), Băsescu accepted Cioroianu and the latter assumed office at the Ministry of Foreign Affairs.

=== Impeachment vote by the Parliament ===
In early 2007, Băsescu was proposed for impeachment by the members of the opposition parties for alleged unconstitutional conduct. Allegedly, one of the major issues in the confrontation was the activity of Justice Minister Monica Macovei, who supported prosecutor's efforts to follow up on cases of corruption, especially those involving politically connected individuals. Among the main reasons given in the proposal to suspend Băsescu were:

- infringing upon and "substituting the authority" of the Government, the judicial system and the Parliament.
- committing acts of "political partisanship" with direct reference to the Democratic Party, abuse of power and acting more like a "judge of the other public authorities" than a "collaborator", thus "abandoning his role of impartial mediator required by the Romanian Constitution".
- manipulating and "instigating public opinion against other state institutions" such as the Parliament and the Government.

Băsescu and his supporters denied the accusations, stating that his actions and statements were ways of fighting against corruption in the political and judicial systems, and against "circles of business interests" with unlawful purposes.

The Constitutional Court of Romania found no clear evidence of his breach of the Constitution in the sense required by the fundamental law. However, the court ruling was only consultative, and the two chambers of the Romanian Parliament voted in favor of Băsescu's impeachment on 19 April 2007, with 322 votes for the impeachment proposal, 108 against, and 8 abstentions (the minimum number of votes needed was 233). Băsescu contested the decision, but the Constitutional Court rejected his appeal as inadmissible, and upheld the vote.

In the meantime, the independent Macovei and the PD ministers had been dismissed by Prime Minister Popescu-Tăriceanu, while the European election had been postponed to the fall of 2007. Pro-Băsescu politicians have characterized the anti-Băsescu coalition that formed as "the black alliance," as it contained a broad spectrum of political parties and interests: Social-Democrats favoring heavy state involvement in the economy, National-Liberals and Conservatives favoring business interests, Hungarian minority MPs, and anti-Hungarian ultra-nationalists.

In 2007, when Traian Băsescu was temporarily suspended from the Presidency, he said in a meeting: "It seems [former] President Ion Iliescu turned to more modern means [of removing political opponents], this time without calling the miners to 'defend the country', but used 322 Members of Parliament for my impeachment."

=== 2007 impeachment referendum ===
As a result of the impeachment vote by the Parliament, Băsescu was suspended from his function as president on 19 April 2007, and a national referendum was held on 19 May 2007 to decide by popular vote whether to dismiss him. According to the electoral law (article 5(2) of the Referendum Law), an absolute majority of all Romanians with the right to vote is required for a positive result in a dismissal referendum, which means that almost 9 million people would have had to vote against Băsescu. After the impeachment vote, several public rallies to support Băsescu in the referendum, and protest against his suspension, were organized by PD and PLD both in Romania (Bucharest, Iaşi, etc.), as well as abroad (e.g. in Madrid).

On 17 April Băsescu stated that if Parliament voted for his impeachment, he would resign "five minutes" after the vote, avoiding a referendum for dismissal and triggering early presidential elections. However, on 20 April he decided not to resign, claiming he wished to limit the period of political instability.

Băsescu and his supporters in the Democratic Party also suggested that his political opponents would try to modify the electoral law in order to prohibit a previously suspended president from running in the elections again, following a Rolandas Paksas scenario.

On 25 April the Constitutional Court approved the modifications brought by parliament to the Referendum Law. The new article 10 (regarding the presidential impeachment process) considers that the impeachment process "will be approved through the majority of votes for the participants at the referendum, and article 5(2) does not apply to this type of referendum". Therefore, the 19 May referendum remained valid, despite the participation of less than 40% of eligible Romanians. However, since only a 25% minority of voters voted in the affirmative, and a 75% majority in the negative, Băsescu regained full prerogatives on 24 May after the referendum results were confirmed.

=== PDL-PSD coalition government ===
In December 2008, in the aftermath of legislative elections which gave PDL and PSD similar scores, the two joined forces to form a coalition, under a PDL Prime Minister. After one of its ministers was expelled from the government by the prime minister against the will of the party, the PSD decided to leave the government in early October. Soon afterwards, the government fell following the adoption of a motion of no confidence in Parliament. Băsescu nominated Lucian Croitoru as the new prime minister, against the will of the parliamentary majority, which supported Klaus Iohannis. After Croitoru was voted down, Băsescu nominated PDL member Liviu Negoiță as prime minister, again ignoring the proposal of the parliamentary majority. A caretaker government remained in office. The ongoing political crisis prevented Romania from getting two instalments of a 20-billion-euro loan from the International Monetary Fund and the European Union.

=== 2012 impeachment referendum ===
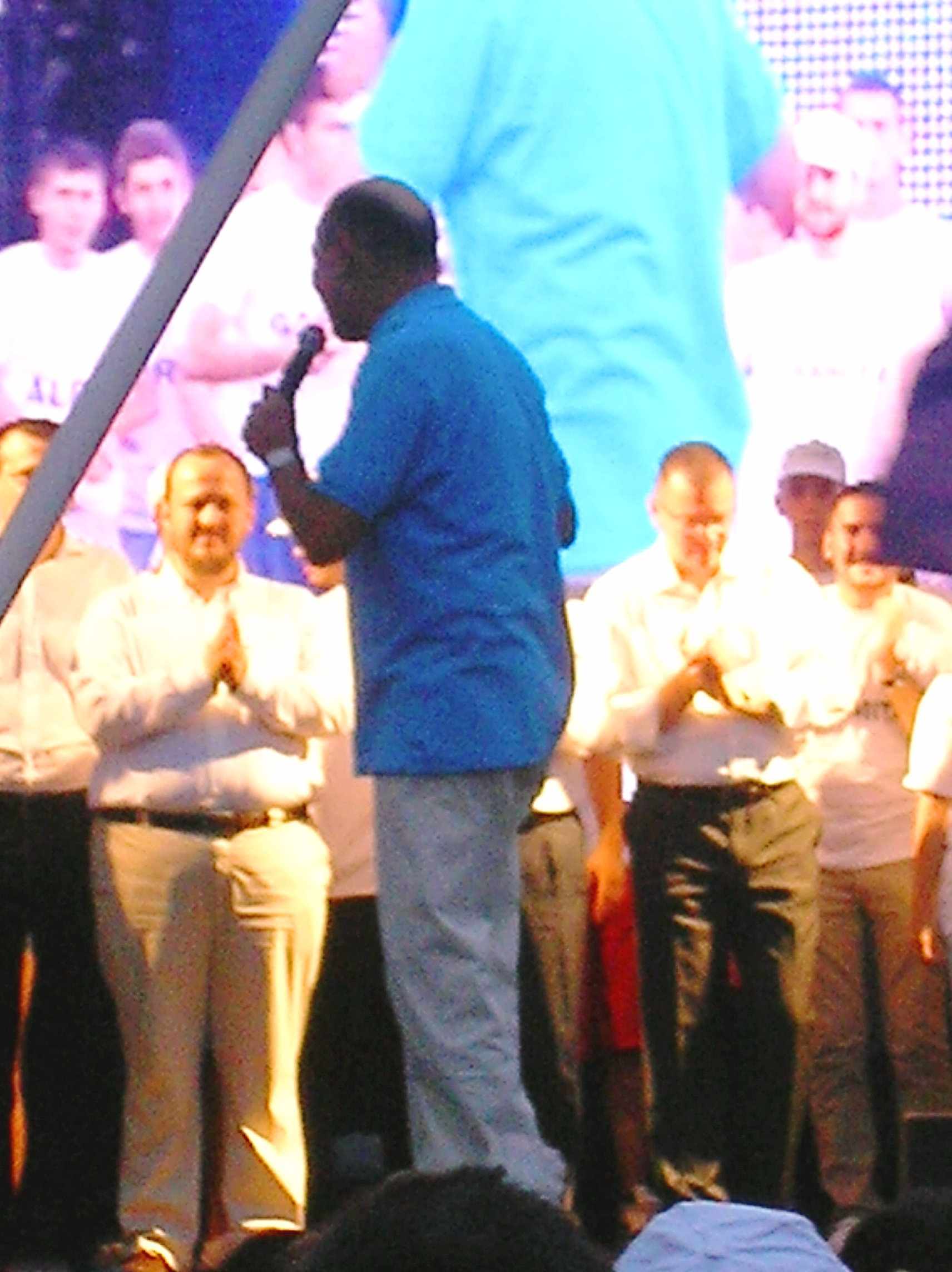
Traian Băsescu speaking in front of his supporters during an anti-impeachment protest in Bucharest, 2012

Băsescu was suspended by the Parliament a second time on 6 July 2012, with a referendum on his impeachment being held on 29 July 2012. After initially calling on the population to vote, PDL called for a boycott, accusing the majority party USL of attempted fraud. Băsescu, however, declared that he would still vote, albeit not voting after all. An overwhelming 88.7% of people who went to vote rejected his leadership. However, the turnout at the referendum was estimated at 46%, which was less than the 50% + 1 required for it to be validated.

The Romanian Constitutional Court subsequently invalidated the referendum by a vote of 6–3, which reinstated Băsescu as president of Romania. In June 2015 The Attorney General of Romania started investigating illegalities committed by certain members of the Constitutional Court in order to save the embattled president. The US envoy Philip Gordon visited Romania supporting Băsescu, accused the president opposition of massive fraud, angering the 8.4 million voters, per Romania TV. Of the thousands of people investigated of election fraud only one received the guilty verdict in Court, a saving face verdict for the errors committed by the US envoy, as per DC News. Băsescu said that now is the time to leave old conflicts aside in order to solve Romania's problems, and to "restore a functioning democratic Romania, and restore our credibility." On the other hand, Crin Antonescu, who has served as acting president during this entire process, claims Băsescu is an "illegitimate" leader as he was suspended by Parliament and dismissed by the people.

Following his return to Cotroceni, Băsescu maintained a low profile until the regular parliamentary elections. On 9 December 2012, the elections produced a new parliamentary configuration, with an overwhelming USL majority dominating the other parties by a 70% margin. The "presidential party", PDL, only attained 16% of the total votes, failing to win all but one electoral circumscription while former presidential adviser Eugen Tomac won the second external circumscription, including the Republic of Moldova. The landslide victory of the former opposition coalition marginalized Băsescu and drastically reduced his possibilities to negotiate a new PDL-based coalition, thus being left with no other viable alternative than to nominate PSD president Victor Ponta to form the new government.

Băsescu and Ponta signed a framework treaty, intended to smoothen the future institutional collaboration between the presidency and the government. But soon afterwards, first tensions started to creep in, as Ponta depicted the EU-Budget negotiations outcome for Romania as a political defeat for Băsescu.

== Post-presidency (2014–present) ==
On 9 October 2015, Băsescu joined the People's Movement Party (PMP). PMP's fourth congress was held on 24 October, with Băsescu being elected president of the party.

In the light of the local elections of 2016, Băsescu expressed his intentions to run for a new term as mayor of Bucharest. However, following an accusation of money laundering, Băsescu retired and PMP subsequently nominated journalist Robert Turcescu as their official candidate.

In the 2016 legislative elections, Băsescu won a seat as senator of Bucharest on PMP's list, as the party placed sixth in the elections, with 5.35% of the vote. He resigned from PMP leadership in 2018, and was elected honorary president of the party at the congress in June 2018.

=== Involvement in Moldovan politics ===
Along with the granting of Moldovan citizenship in June 2016 which was subsequently withdrawn on 25 June 2017, Băsescu was elected honorary president of the National Unity Party (PUN). Anatol Șalaru, the party founder, stated that the party leader's seat will remain vacant until Băsescu gets back his Moldovan citizenship.

=== 2020 local elections ===
Băsescu ran for a new term as mayor of Bucharest at the 2020 local elections. Partial results have confirmed that he has secured third place with approximately 11% of the total cast votes.

=== 2025 Romanian presidential election ===
During the 2025 Romanian presidential election, Băsescu endorsed Nicușor Dan's candidacy, with Dan defeating George Simion 53.6–46.4% in the second round on 18 May. On 26 May 2025, Băsescu participated in Dan's inauguration as Romanian president.

=== Health ===
In May 2006, Băsescu underwent surgery for disc herniation in Vienna. In September 2007, Băsescu underwent rutine surgery on his thyroid gland. In March 2022, Băsescu was hospitalised in Brussels after suffering several medical complications. On 26 January 2024, Băsescu was hospitalised after doctors determined that he was suffering from a lung virus. In June 2025, Băsescu underwent planned heart surgery in Paris.

== Relationship with the press ==
Băsescu is a major target of criticism by the press, and in turn he used controversial language to describe some of the journalists who have been critical of him.

In October 2006, he referred to journalist Ovidiu Zara, of the Curentul newspaper, using the Romanian word "găozar" (roughly "faggot"). In 2009, the president's brother, Mircea Băsescu, also used the word găozar to refer to the Gândul newspaper journalist Robert Veress. In protest leading Romanian journalist Cristian Tudor Popescu, the editor in chief Gândul, appeared on his TV show Cap și Pajură holding a sign saying gazetar găozar (roughly "faggot journalist").

On 19 May 2007, the day of the suspension referendum, Băsescu took the mobile phone of Antena 1 journalist Andreea Pană, who was filming him while he was shopping with his wife, despite being asked to leave him alone. Forgetting to turn it off, he was recorded referring to Pană as a stinking gypsy during a conversation with his wife in his car. The recording was made public by the Antena 1 TV station after the phone was returned to Pană the next day. After public outcry, Băsescu's spokesman expressed regret over the fact that "an inappropriate expression in a private discussion became public". The president of the Commission for Human Rights, Cults and Minorities in the Chamber of Deputies, Nicolae Păun, who is himself part of the Roma community, stated that President Băsescu is not a racist, and cannot be condemned for a statement made in private. Romani CRISS, on the other hand, issued a letter of protest, saying "Romani Criss consider unacceptable for the Romanian President to use such language, sexist and racist alike." Other criticism came from the International Federation of Journalists, Agenţia de Monitorizare a Presei, and Clubul Român de Presă. Romania's National Council for Combating Discrimination decided that the expression "stinking gypsy" was discriminatory and sanctioned Traian Băsescu with a warning.

In 2008, Băsescu referred to journalist Victor Ciutacu, the editor in chief of Jurnalul Național, which was highly critical of him, as "jukebox on euros" (Romanian: tonomat cu euro), a meme that Ciutacu later used repeatedly on his TV show Vorbe grele, even in the show's logo.

During the 2009 presidential election, Băsescu released two video clips starring himself and actors who were parodying his Antena 3 critics: Mircea Badea, a TV host, well known for his critical stance on Băsescu, as well as Mihai Gâdea, the host, and Valentin Stan, a frequent guest on the TV political talk show Sinteza Zilei.

Băsescu had a good relationship with journalists who praised him, in particular TV host Radu Moraru, of the B1 TV show Nașul, who described Băsescu as "the greatest president of Romania in the last 20 years" in the opening of an interview with him.

== Criticism and controversies ==
=== Corruption scandals ===
In the summer of 2009, Băsescu was criticized in an editorial in the Gândul newspaper for remaining silent for a long time regarding the corruption scandal surrounding Monica Iacob Ridzi, the PD-L Youth Minister, in contrast to the harsh criticism he had expressed against ministers from other parties when they were accused of corruption (Tudor Chiuariu, Codruț Șereș). Similarly, Tom Gallagher, a Romania specialist at Bradford University, wrote that Băsescu's public image suffered after his daughter, Elena Băsescu, became an MEP through "purely byzantine maneuvers" with the help of Ridzi, and after Băsescu "appeared to express solidarity" with Ridzi against the media that was reporting on the scandal. At Monica Ridzi's trial it was said that the beneficiary of the illegal financial activities was Traian Băsescu's daughter. In 2015 Mircea Băsescu, the ex-president's brother was accused and jailed for receiving money with the promise to save an imprisoned criminal. Other family members, his son-in-law and a nephew, have been accused of selling justice and producing false documents. There was evidence presented at Antena 3, Romania TV and Realitatea TV that Mircea Băsescu said that his brother knew of the illegal dealings.

On 20 April 2016 the General Prosecutor's Office announced that they decided to prosecute Traian Băsescu for money laundering in a criminal case concerning the sale of land in Bucharest's northern neighbourhood of Băneasa to the businessman Costel Cășuneanu. This prompted Băsescu to drop his bid for Bucharest's mayoral office in the upcoming local elections.

=== Controversy with Azerbaijan ===
According to Civic Solidarity platform's report "European values bought and sold" Traian Băsescu is one of the most prominent lobbyists for the Azerbaijani regime in Romania. For years he has been a valuable asset for the Azerbaijani ruling party in their efforts to buying influence in the country. During his Precedency the ties between the countries became unprecedently close. It is reported to be connected to Romania's interest in the Azerbaijani gas, which was agreed to be transported to Romania according to the AGRI deal. The International consortium of investigative journalists, the Organized Crime and Corruption Reporting Project (OCCRP) has discovered criminal connections behind the real estate where the Heydar Aliyev Foundation was located in Bucharest. The foundation, named after the father of the current president Aliyev was inaugurated in 2007, during the presidency of Traian Băsescu. In Bucharest, President Băsescu personally opened a memorial park for Heydar Aliyev. The current president of Azerbaijan Ilham Aliyev was twice decorated by the Romanian presidents. Despite his close ties with Azerbaijani government, Traian Băsescu became one of co-authors of the controversial statement on Nagorno-Karabakh conflict, issued by European Parliament on 10 June 2020.

=== Comments regarding King Michael ===
In June 2011, during a televised talk-show, president Băsescu made a disputed remark about former King Michael of Romania saying that "he was a slave to the Russians" and calling his 1947 abdication "an act of treason". The president noted that King Michael was the official head of state at the time of the events in question—both during the alliance with Nazi Germany, and during the Soviet occupation. This triggered a wave of criticism, and some letters demanding he resign, from the opposition parties and their sympathizers, who expressed their disapproval of such an interpretation of Romanian history, and the perceived lack of respect towards the former king. On 23 July, he told the public he "deeply regrets" his comments about King Michael, calling it a sensitive issue.

President Băsescu added that if he had been in Marshal Antonescu's place, he too would have ordered the Romanian troops to cross the Prut River and attack the USSR, with the purpose of regaining Bessarabia, lost in 1940. In response to this, the Russian Ministry of Foreign Affairs released a press statement asking for the immediate response of "civilized Europe to this justification of Nazi aggression against USSR and dishonor to the memory of millions lost during World War II," and called Băsescu's declarations "shameless bravado".

=== Collaboration with the Securitate ===
In June 2019, the National Council for the Study of the Securitate Archives (CNSAS) published documents provided by the Romanian Intelligence Service (SRI) and General Directorate for Defense Intelligence (DGIA), by which Traian Băsescu had been recruited by the Securitate as informant in 1972, under the code name "Petrov", and started to provide reports on his colleagues since his freshman year. According to the law 187/1999, the status of Securitate collaborator has to be confirmed by a Court of Appeal.

On 5 September 2019, in the first hearing before the Court of Appeal, Băsescu admitted writing the memos published by CNSAS, using the name "Petrov" at the request of Colonel Tudor from the military counterintelligence. However he denied having been an official collaborator of the Securitate (with a signed agreement), mentioning that he also filed other reports to his employer (the former Romanian shipping company "Navrom") under his real name.

On 20 September 2019 the Court of Appeal Bucharest ruled that Traian Băsescu officially collaborated with the Securitate. Băsescu stated he would appeal against the ruling. The appeal at the High Court of Cassation and Justice will start on 5 November 2021.

On 23 March 2022 the High Court of Cassation and Justice rejected Băsescu's appeal, thus confirming the Court of Appeal's ruling that he officially collaborated with the Securitate. Băsescu announced that he would take legal action with the European Court of Human Rights.

=== Comments regarding Romani people ===
Băsescu has been noted for his controversial remarks about Romani people, who are a small and disadvantaged community in Romania. During a television interview in 2010, he stated that Roma "avoid work and make a living by stealing", which led to a fine by the official anti-discrimination agency. He advocates using the exonym "gypsie", which is considered a racial slur by most Roma. In 2007, he insulted a journalist who was filming him as a "stinking gypsy".

== Honours ==
=== Foreign honours ===
- Azerbaijan: Recipient of the Heydar Aliyev Order (18 April 2011)
- Estonia: Collar of the Order of the Cross of Terra Mariana (6 April 2011)
- Finland: Grand Cross with Collar of the Order of the White Rose of Finland (2008)
- Italy: Knight Grand Cross with Collar of the Order of Merit of the Italian Republic (7 September 2011)
- Latvia: Commander Grand Cross with Chain of the Order of the Three Stars (28 February 2011)
- Malta: Honorary Companion of Honour with Collar National Order of Merit (7 October 2010)
- Moldova:
  - Recipient of the Order of the Republic (27 January 2010)
  - Recipient of the Order of the Stephen the Great (2 April 2015)
- Monaco: Knight Grand Cross of the Order of Saint-Charles (16 April 2009)
- Poland: Knight of the Order of the White Eagle (2009)
- Serbia: Grand Cross of the Order of the Republic of Serbia (2013)
- Sovereign Military Order of Malta: Collar of the Order pro Merito Melitensi (2008)
- Spain: Knight of the Collar of the Order of Isabella the Catholic (16 November 2007)
- Sweden: Knight of the Royal Order of the Seraphim (2008)

== Electoral history ==
=== Mayor of Bucharest ===
Election	Affiliation	First round			Second round		
Election	Affiliation	Votes	Percentage	Position	Votes	Percentage	Position
2000	PD	108,862	17.18%	2nd	362,853	50.68%	1st
2004	DA	417,153	54.94%	1st	–		
2020	PMP	72,556	10.99%	3rd			

=== Presidential elections ===
Election	Affiliation	First round			Second round		
Election	Affiliation	Votes	Percentage	Position	Votes	Percentage	Position
2004	DA (PNL–PD)	3,545,236	33.9%	2nd	5,126,794	51.2%	1st
2009	PDL	3,153,640	32.44%	1st	5,275,808	50.33%	1st

Political offices
Preceded by Viorel Lis	Mayor of Bucharest; 2000–2004	Succeeded by Adriean Videanu
Preceded by Ion Iliescu	President of Romania; 2004–2007	Succeeded by Nicolae Văcăroiu; Acting
Preceded by Nicolae Văcăroiu; Acting	President of Romania; 2007–2012	Succeeded by Crin Antonescu; Acting
Preceded by Crin Antonescu; Acting	President of Romania; 2012–2014	Succeeded by Klaus Iohannis
