= Săftoiu =

Săftoiu is a Romanian language surname. Notable people with the surname include:

- Adriana Săftoiu (born 1967), Romanian journalist and politician
- Claudiu Săftoiu (born 1968), Romanian journalist, former husband of Adriana
