= MT Unirea =

Romanian-flagged crude oil carrier

History

Romania
- Name: Unirea
- Owner: Navrom
- Operator: Navrom
- Port of registry: Constanţa, Romania
- Builder: Constanța Shipyard, Romania
- Launched: 1980
- Fate: Sunk, 1982

General characteristics
- Type: Crude oil tanker
- Tonnage: 163,257 tonnes deadweight (DWT); Suez Canal Net Tonnage 79,621.22 long tons (80,899 t)
- Length: 299 m (981 ft 0 in) o/a
- Beam: 47 m (154 ft 2 in)
- Draft: 17.8 m (58 ft 5 in)
- Depth: 23.2 m (76 ft 1 in) moulded
- Capacity: 163,400 m³ (at 98%)

MT Unirea (Romanian Union) was a Romanian-flagged crude oil carrier, one of the biggest ships of the Romanian commercial fleet. She broke up and sank in 1982 in the Bulgarian waters of the Black Sea, 40 nautical miles (74 km) south-south east of the Cape Kaliakra at a depth of 1,400 metres (4,600 ft) after a mysterious explosion. The crew totalled 43 members of which 42 were rescued by Romanian and Soviet boats. The sinking of Unirea was classified by Lloyd's List as the largest ship accident of 1982.

== Investigations ==
The exact cause of accident is unknown but official reports suggest that during a vapor evacuation of the central number 3 tank an explosive mixture formed alongside the evacuation hole that could have been ignited by multiple sources but especially electrostatic energy. The explosion of the central number 3 tank had a devastating effect on the integrity of the ship triggering a series of explosions that destroyed the separating wall of the central and starboard tanks favoring the expansion of the volatile elements across the ship. The fire that followed also contributed to the vertical breaking of the ship's shell and the eventual sinking. Other official reports claim that the accident was caused by a collision with a World War II mine. A different opinion (unofficial) came from some naval architects and marine engineers stating that the ship broke up because of incorrect ballasting (the ship had no cargo at the time of the accident).

The Romanian shipping company "Navrom" claimed the insurance payout, amounting to US$36.6 million. This action resulted in a thorough inspection of the ship's wreck by independent survey teams, employed by the insurance company from Lloyd's Register, Japan. As the inspection did not reveal any major faults in construction, the insurance was finally paid.

== Rescue operations ==
The rescue operation was coordinated from the Bulgarian shore and involved eight Romanian ships, Motru 25,000 t DWT, Tg. Bujor 18,000 t DWT, Mărășești 18,000 t DWT, Căciulata 8,750 t DWT, Gostinul 4,800 t DWT, Grădiștea 4,800 t DWT, Toplița 2,400 t DWT and the Voinicul tugboat, five Bulgarian ships, Perun, Rusalka, Icar, Europa, and Kiten, two Soviet ships, Ianghi Iuli and Gordelivi, and rescue helicopters from Romania and Bulgaria. The Romanian ships Motru and Tg. Bujor each rescued 18 crew members, the Soviet ship Ianhghi Iuli rescued 5 and the last crew member, Gabriel Georgescu, was rescued by a Bulgarian helicopter after staying eight hours in the cold waters of the Black Sea. The only casualty was the ship's waitress Elena Ganță.

== Sister ships ==
M/T Unirea was the second of a series of five Romanian supertankers that were constructed by the Constanța Shipyard in the 1980s. The sister ships were as follows:

M/T Independența (Independence) - collided in 1979 with a freighter at the southern entrance of Bosphorus, Turkey and exploded. She caught fire and grounded. Almost all of the tanker's crew members died. The wreck of the Independența burned for weeks causing heavy air and sea pollution in the Istanbul area and the Sea of Marmara.

M/T Biruința (Triumph) - Owned and managed by the then Romanian state-owned shipping company, Navrom. In the 1990s the ship was passed to the Romanian private shipping company Petromin, changing its name to M/T Iris Star. Iris Star lost power because of engine failure during a passage through the Bosphorus on 27 July 2000, and drifted towards Kandilli point. There was no extensive damage reported. Finally the ship was bought by the Romanian shipping company Histria Shipmanagement having its name changed again to M/T Histria Crown. The ship was finally decommissioned in 2006 after more than 20 years of service.

M/T Libertatea (Liberty) - had the same history (including ownership) as her older sister M/T Biruinţa with the only exception that the ship is still in operation under the name M/T Histria Prestige.

M/T Pacea (Peace) - was never fully completed. At the end of the 1980s it was passed to Czechoslovakia as a part of Romania's foreign debt.
