= Histria Topaz =

History
- Name: Histria Topaz
- Owner: Histria Shipmanagement
- Port of registry: Constanţa, Romania
- Ordered: 1985
- Builder: Constanța Shipyard
- Yard number: 357
- Launched: 1987
- Completed: 1987
- In service: 1987
- Identification: IMO number: 8501189; Callsign: V4EK2

General characteristics
- Class & type: Oil tanker
- Tonnage: 39,750 dwt
- Length: 188.95 m (619 ft 11 in)
- Beam: 28 m (91 ft 10 in)
- Draft: 12.041 m (39 ft 6.1 in)
- Depth: 16.8 m (55 ft 1 in)
- Installed power: 12,360 kW (16,580 hp)
- Speed: 15 kn (28 km/h; 17 mph)
- Capacity: 44,884 m^{3} (282,310 bbl)
- Crew: Romanian

Histria Topaz is a chemical/oil products tanker owned by the Romanian shipping company Histria Shipmanagement and is registered in Majuro, Marshall Islands.

== History ==
Histria Topaz was built by the Galați shipyard in 1987 as a 39,750 DWT ship used for the transportation of oil and oil products and chemical products. The ship is chartered by the Italian oil and natural gas company Eni.

== Technical description ==
Histria Topaz is equipped with a double hull, one two-stroke acting diesel engine MAN B&W 6S50MC-C with a capacity of 9,480 kW (12,710 hp) directly acting on the propeller shaft and a four-bladed fixed propeller built by Wärtsilä Propulsion Netherlands. It also has another three auxiliary MAN B&W 6L23/30H diesel engines with a capacity of 960 kW (1,290 hp) each. The ship has 14 hydraulically driven centrifugal deepwell Framo cargo pumps, 10 pumps with a capacity of 500 cubic metres (3,100 bbl)/hour, two pumps with a capacity of 200 m^{3} (1,300 bbl)/hour, one pump with a capacity of 100 m^{3} (630 bbl)/hour and one portable pump with a capacity of 150 m^{3} (940 bbl)/hour.

The ship is equipped with five manifolds, a discharge capacity of 3,000 m^{3} (19,000 bbl)/hour, a cargo handling capacity of 3,750 m^{3} (23,600 bbl)/hour, one Liebherr hose-handling crane with a reach of 22 m (72 ft), an Alfa Lawal JWSP-26-C100 freshwater conversion plant with a capacity of 30 m^{3} (1,100 cu ft)/day and a Jowa Bio STP3 sewage-treatment plant capable of sustaining 34 people. The ship has ten cargo tanks, two tanks with a capacity of 3,550 m^{3} (22,300 bbl), four tanks with a capacity of 4,900 m^{3} (31,000 bbl), four tanks with a capacity of 5,100 m^{3} (32,000 bbl) and two slop tanks with a capacity of 1,000 m^{3} (6,300 bbl).
