= Histria Diamond =

Chemical and oil products tanker

History
- Name: Histria Diamond
- Owner: Histria Shipmanagement
- Port of registry: (Malta) Valletta
- Ordered: 1987
- Builder: Constanța Shipyard
- Yard number: 411
- Launched: 1989
- Completed: 1989
- In service: 1989
- Identification: IMO number: 8513651; Callsign: A8PB3

General characteristics
- Class & type: Oil tanker
- Tonnage: 89,077 DWT
- Length: 228.5 m (749 ft 8 in)
- Beam: 43 m (141 ft 1 in)
- Draft: 14 m (45 ft 11 in)
- Depth: 19.75 m (64 ft 10 in)
- Installed power: 28,552 kW (38,289 hp)
- Speed: 15 kn (28 km/h; 17 mph)
- Capacity: 101,803 m^{3} (640,320 bbl)

Histria Diamond is a chemical/oil products tanker owned by the Romanian shipping company Histria Shipmanagement and is registered in Valletta, Malta.

== History ==
Histria Diamond was built by the Constanța Shipyard in 2006 as a 89,077 DWT ship used for the transportation of oil and oil products and chemical products. The ship is chartered by the Italian oil and natural gas company Eni.

== Technical description ==
The Histria Diamond is equipped with a double hull, one two-stroke acting diesel engine MAN B&W 6S50MC-C with a capacity of 20,951 kW (28,096 hp) directly acting on the propeller shaft and a four-bladed fixed propeller built by Wärtsilä Propulsion Netherlands. It also has another three auxiliary MAN B&W 6L23/30H diesel engines with a capacity of 2,534 kW (3,398 hp) each. The ship has 14 hydraulically driven centrifugal deepwell Framo cargo pumps, 10 pumps with a capacity of 1105 m^{3}/hour, two pumps with a capacity of 442 m^{3} (117,000 US gal; 97,000 imp gal)/hour, one pump with a capacity of 221 m^{3} (58,000 US gal; 49,000 imp gal)/hour and one portable pump with a capacity of 332 m^{3} (88,000 US gal; 73,000 imp gal)/hour.

The ship is equipped with five manifolds, a discharge capacity of 6,630 m^{3}/hour, a cargo handling capacity of 8,288 m^{3} (2,189,000 US gal; 1,823,000 imp gal)/hour, one Liebherr hose-handling crane with a reach of 40 m (130 ft), an Alfa Lawal JWSP-26-C100 freshwater conversion plant with a capacity of 100 m^{3} (26,000 US gal; 22,000 imp gal)/day and a Jowa Bio STP3 sewage-treatment plant capable of sustaining 100 people. The ship has ten cargo tanks, two tanks with a capacity of 7,846 m^{3} (49,350 bbl), four tanks with a capacity of 10,820 m^{3} (68,100 bbl), four tanks with a capacity of 11,271 m^{3} (70,890 bbl) and two slop tanks with a capacity of 2,210 m^{3} (13,900 bbl).
