= Vorbe =

Vorbe is a surname. Notable people with the surname include:

- Fabien Vorbe (born 1990), Haitian footballer
- Philippe Vorbe (born 1947), Haitian footballer
- Sebastien Vorbe (born 1976), Haitian footballer, nephew of Philippe

== See also ==
- Vorbe grele, Romanian news television series
