= Histria Tiger =

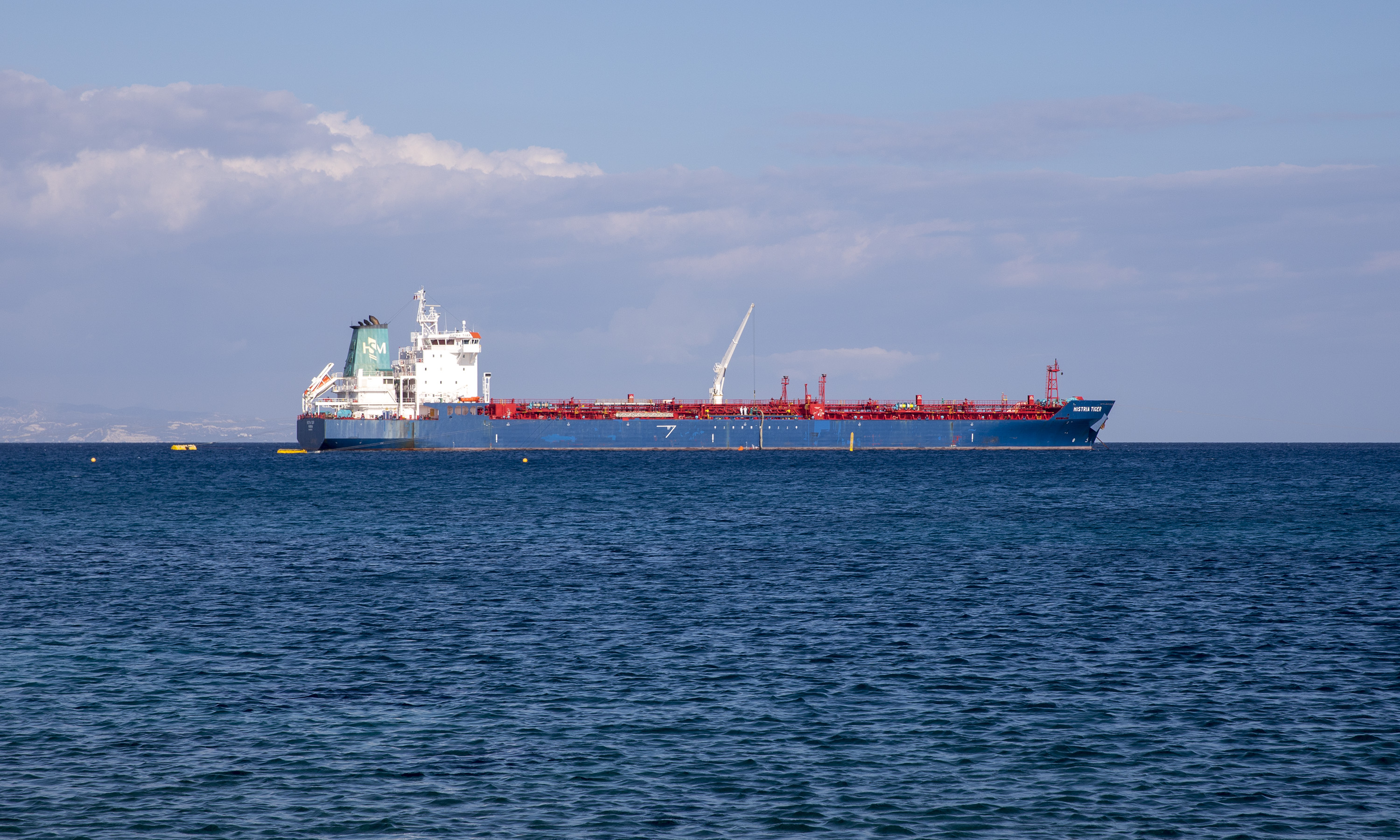
- The oil tanker, Histria Tiger, in Cyprus

History
- Name: Histria Tiger
- Owner: Histria Shipmanagement
- Port of registry: Monrovia, Liberia
- Ordered: 2006
- Builder: Constanța Shipyard
- Yard number: 574
- Launched: 2008
- Completed: 2008
- In service: 2008
- Identification: IMO number: 9396335; MMSI number: 636013848; Callsign: A8PW3

General characteristics
- Class & type: Oil tanker
- Tonnage: 40,416 dwt
- Length: 179.96 m (590.4 ft)
- Beam: 32.2 m (106 ft)
- Draft: 11 m (36 ft)
- Depth: 16.5 m (54 ft)
- Installed power: 12,360 kW (16,580 hp)
- Speed: 15 kn (17 mph)
- Capacity: 47,803 m^{3}
- Crew: Romanian

Histria Tiger is a Chemical/Oil Products Tanker owned by the Romanian shipping company Histria Shipmanagement and is registered in Monrovia, Liberia.

== History ==
Histria Tiger was built by the Constanța Shipyard in 2008 as a 40,416 DWT ship used for the transportation of oil and oil products and chemical products. The ship is chartered by the Italian oil and natural gas company Eni.

== Technical description ==
The Histria Tiger is equipped with a double hull, one two-stroke acting diesel engine MAN B&W 6S50MC-C with a capacity of 9,480 kW (12,710 hp) directly acting on the propeller shaft and a four-bladed fixed propeller built by Wärtsilä Propulsion Netherlands. It also has another three auxiliary MAN B&W 6L23/30H diesel engines with a capacity of 960 kW (1,290 hp) each. The ship has 14 hydraulically driven centrifugal deepwell Framo cargo pumps, 10 pumps with a capacity of 500 m^{3}/hour, two pumps with a capacity of 200 m^{3}/hour, one pump with a capacity of 100 m^{3}/hour and one portable pump with a capacity of 150 m^{3}/hour.

The ship is equipped with five manifolds, a discharge capacity of 3,000 m^{3}/hour, a cargo handling capacity of 3,750 m^{3}/hour, one Liebherr hose-handling crane with a reach of 22 m (72 ft), an Alfa Lawal JWSP-26-C100 freshwater conversion plant with a capacity of 30 m^{3}/day and a Jowa Bio STP3 sewage-treatment plant capable of sustaining 34 people. The ship has ten cargo tanks, two tanks with a capacity of 3,550 m^{3}, four tanks with a capacity of 4,900 m^{3}, four tanks with a capacity of 5,100 m^{3} and two slop tanks with a capacity of 1,000 m^{3}.
