= Adriana Săftoiu =

Romanian journalist and politician

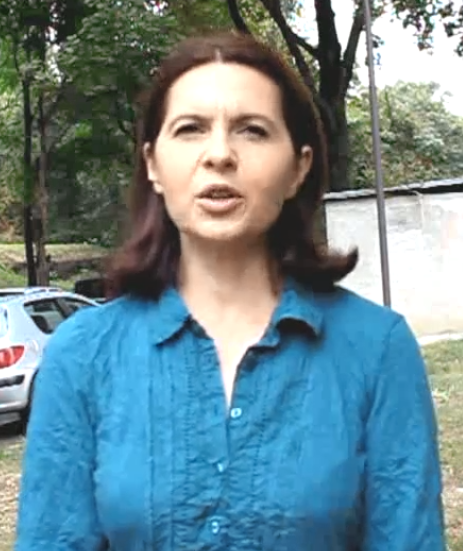
Adriana Săftoiu

Ana Adriana Săftoiu (born 11 September 1967) is a Romanian journalist and politician. While a member of the National Liberal Party (PNL), she was a member of the Romanian Chamber of Deputies for Bucharest in December 2004, and represented Prahova County in the Chamber from 2008 to 2012. In the interim, from 2004 to 2007, she was an adviser and press secretary for President Traian Băsescu.

She was married to former presidential adviser and former Foreign Intelligence Service (SIE) director Claudiu Săftoiu for eighteen years until their divorce in 2011; they have one child.

== Biography ==
She was born in Dej and in 1992 graduated from the Romanian-Spanish department in the Literature Faculty of the University of Bucharest. She took a further year of studies in Comparative Literature at the same institution, as well as journalism classes at three different institutions between 1995 and 1998. From 1993 to 1996, she was a journalist for Rompres, then working at Mediafax from 1996 to 1998. From 1998 to 1999, holding the rank of secretary of state, she was press secretary for the government, while Radu Vasile served as Prime Minister. From 2000 to 2001, Săftoiu was cabinet director at the Transport Ministry, beginning when Băsescu held the ministerial portfolio. Between 2001 and 2004, she headed the press bureau of the Democratic Party (PD), after Băsescu became president of that party.

In 2004, Săftoiu was elected to Parliament as a PD member, but resigned her seat five days later, after being appointed adviser within the Communications Department and press secretary to incoming President Băsescu; the two positions cannot be held simultaneously. One episode that marked her tenure was a conflict with Defence Minister Teodor Atanasiu, whom she took to court in July 2006 for abuse of office, accusing him of using the Army intelligence service to spy on her, following a comment he made on television to that effect. As a result, Atanasiu was suspended by the president before resigning under pressure several months later. Her resignation from the Băsescu administration in March 2007, coming shortly after that of her husband from the SIE directorship, prompted intense speculation. She stated it was for strictly personal reasons, but others cited an e-mail she sent to PD secretary general Vasile Blaga, in which she asked for his intervention with Băsescu to reconcile her family relations, which had allegedly deteriorated due to the intrigues of administration colleague Elena Udrea. Another theory pointed to a newspaper article alleging she was having an extramarital affair; rumours had also circulated that her husband was involved in an affair of his own. Săftoiu's departure came at a politically sensitive moment for the president, who was impeached shortly thereafter. The following month saw publication of Vocile puterii ("The Voices of Power"), her book of interviews with all sixteen post-1989 Revolution presidential and governmental press secretaries.

From 2007 to 2008, Săftoiu headed Capital Promotion, a Bucharest consulting firm. In a February 2008 interview, she remarked that Băsescu, whom she accused of creating a Messiah image for himself, and Udrea, whom she described as "dreaded but not respected", rule the PDL (into which the PD had by then evolved) by fear. That summer, she joined the PNL, running for a seat in Prahova County, considered the fiefdom of one of Băsescu's most trenchant opponents, businessman Dinu Patriciu. She won her race at that autumn's election, after which the PNL moved into opposition. In the Chamber, she sat on the committee for education, science, youth and sport, and was a deputy leader of the PNL group from 2010. In February 2012, against a backdrop of anti-government protests and calls for early elections, Săftoiu resigned her seat. That December, Săftoiu's local PNL chapter removed her from the party without informing her in advance, prompting her to comment that the process was harsher than purges during Romanian Communist Party rule, when one could "at least... say something in one's own defense". In April 2013, Săftoiu became spokeswoman for the PD-L at the invitation of party leader Vasile Blaga, a move seen as a rebuke to Băsescu, who had earlier distanced himself from the party. In May 2015, she published a controversial memoir, Cronică de Cotroceni ("Cotroceni Chronicle"), recounting her years as Băsescu's adviser. Among the book's claims is that Băsescu and Udrea carried on an extramarital affair in the former's office at Cotroceni Palace; the two promptly denied the existence of such a liaison.
