= Histria Agata =

History
- Name: Histria Agata
- Owner: Histria Shipmanagement
- Port of registry: Valletta, Malta
- Ordered: 2005
- Builder: Constanța Shipyard
- Yard number: 572
- Launched: 22 November 2006
- Completed: 2007
- In service: 2007
- Identification: IMO number: 9357559; MMSI number: 256359000; Callsign: 9HSB8

General characteristics
- Type: Oil tanker
- Tonnage: 40,439 DWT
- Length: 179.9 m (590 ft)
- Beam: 32.2 m (106 ft)
- Draft: 11 m (36 ft)
- Depth: 16.5 m (54 ft)
- Installed power: 12,360 kW (16,580 hp)
- Speed: 15 kn (28 km/h; 17 mph)
- Capacity: 47,803 m^{3} (1,688,100 cu ft)
- Crew: Romanian

Histria Agata is a chemical/oil products tanker owned by the Romanian shipping company Histria Shipmanagement and is registered in Valletta, Malta.

== History ==
Histria Agata was built by the Constanța Shipyard in 2007 as a 40,439 DWT ship used for the transportation of oil and oil products and chemical products. The ship is chartered by the Italian oil and natural gas company Eni.

== Technical description ==
The Histria Agata is equipped with a double hull, one two-stroke acting diesel engine MAN B&W 6S50MC-C with a capacity of 9,480 kW (12,710 hp) directly acting on the propeller shaft and a four-bladed fixed propeller built by Wärtsilä Propulsion Netherlands. It also has another three auxiliary MAN B&W 6L23/30H diesel engines with a capacity of 960 kW (1,290 hp) each. The ship has 14 hydraulically driven centrifugal deepwell Framo cargo pumps, 10 pumps with a capacity of 500 m^{3}/hour, two pumps with a capacity of 200 m^{3}/hour, one pump with a capacity of 100 m^{3}/hour and one portable pump with a capacity of 150 m^{3}/hour.

The ship is equipped with five manifolds, a discharge capacity of 3,000 m^{3}/hour, a cargo handling capacity of 3,750 m^{3}/hour, one Liebherr hose-handling crane with a reach of 22 m (72 ft), an Alfa Lawal JWSP-26-C100 freshwater conversion plant with a capacity of 30 m^{3}/day and a Jowa Bio STP3 sewage-treatment plant capable of sustaining 34 people. The ship has ten cargo tanks, two tanks with a capacity of 3,550 m^{3}, four tanks with a capacity of 4,900 m^{3}, four tanks with a capacity of 5,100 m^{3} and two slop tanks with a capacity of 1,000 m^{3}.
