= Claudiu Săftoiu =

Romanian journalist

Claudiu Săftoiu (born 11 October 1968) is a Romanian journalist. From December 2004 to October 2006, he was an adviser to President Traian Băsescu on matters of domestic policy; subsequently, until March 2007, he directed the Foreign Intelligence Service (SIE). He headed Romanian Television from July 2012 to December 2013.

He was married to former presidential adviser and member of the Chamber of Deputies Adriana Săftoiu for eighteen years until their divorce in 2011; they have one child.

== Biography ==
Born in Focşani, in 1994 he graduated from the University of Bucharest's Faculty of Letters. From that time until 2002, he held a variety of jobs in journalism: news reporter at PRO FM (1994–1995); executive director of Radio 2M+ (1994–1995); editor-in-chief and head of the news department at Radio Total (1995–1997); assistant editor-in-chief and head of the political department at Evenimentul Zilei (1997–1999); political interviewer at Privirea (1999–2000); political commentator at Oameni în top (1999–2000); media adviser and press officer at a tourism company (2001–2002); head of the political department at Plai cu Boi (2000–2002). Among the publications that have featured Săftoiu's work are România Literară, Curentul, Azi, Convorbiri literare, Dilema, Curierul romanesc; and he authored a book in 2003, Jurnalismul politic – manipularea politicienilor prin mass-media, manipularea mass-media de către politicieni ("Political Journalism - Manipulation of Politicians by the Mass Media, Manipulation of the Mass Media by Politicians"). Between 1994 and 1997, he conducted over 150 live radio interviews with politicians, and later on, he conducted over 250 interviews with a variety of political figures. In the early 2000s, he worked as a consultant, offering a number of training courses in media communications and campaign management, as well as advising the World Bank on the feasibility of developing the Jiu Valley.

In 2004, following Băsescu's election as President, Săftoiu became his domestic policy adviser. In autumn 2006, the Parliament of Romania, meeting in joint session and on a vote of 294 to 114, confirmed Săftoiu as head of the SIE, with the Greater Romania Party (PRM) and the Conservative Party (PC) voting against. Thereafter, he left his position as adviser. In February 2007, Săftoiu received criticism from the National Liberal Party (PNL) involving two Romanians who had been held on an American base in Iraq since the previous November; at issue was that Prime Minister Călin Popescu-Tăriceanu had only learned of the situation from the news media when the story broke in February. Near the end of the month, as part of a widening feud between Băsescu and Tăriceanu, Parliament voted to establish a committee of inquiry, headed by the PC's Dan Voiculescu, into alleged constitutional violations by Băsescu, a process that eventually ended in his suspension and attempted impeachment. Called to testify, Săftoiu declared that the SIE had the technology to intercept telephone conversations, and had done so inside Romania and not abroad as required, and with the approval of a prosecutor rather than a judge, as required. Săftoiu later attempted to clarify his remarks, asserting that he had not referred exclusively to SIE activities, but he was nonetheless forced to resign by the scandal that ensued. Reportedly, Băsescu refused to answer Săftoiu's telephone calls after his testimony and demanded that he leave office, and once he did so, Tăriceanu labelled it a tacit admission that the SIE had conducted unauthorised telephone tapping.

After his resignation, Săftoiu became a critic of Băsescu's: for instance, in January 2009, he asserted that the President had intercepted conversations between prominent Social Democratic Party politicians Ion Iliescu and Mircea Geoană, prompting a lawsuit by Băsescu. Two months later, in an interview on Vorbe grele, he claimed that elements within the intelligence services do the "dirty work" of the "supreme person", hinting but not explicitly stating that this individual is Băsescu. In July 2012, he was confirmed by Parliament, on a vote of 265 to 5, as president and general director of Romanian Television for a four-year term. In December 2013, he resigned his post, citing inadequacies in carrying out his mandate, including in the area of economic restructuring.
