= MT Independența =

Romanian crude oil carrier

Coordinates: 40°59′39″N 29°00′28″E

History
- Name: Independența
- Port of registry: Romania
- Builder: Șantierul Naval Constanța, Romania
- Launched: 28 May 1977
- Completed: 1978
- Identification: IMO number: 7621657
- Fate: Wrecked in 1979 and subsequently broken up

General characteristics
- Type: Crude oil tanker
- Tonnage: 164,004 DWT
- Length: 283 m (928 ft 6 in) o/a
- Beam: 46 m (150 ft 11 in)
- Draft: 17.4 m (57 ft 1 in)
- Depth: 22 m (72 ft 2 in) moulded
- Capacity: 160,698 m³ (at 98%)

MT Independența ("Independence") was a large Romanian crude oil carrier. She collided in 1979 with a Greek freighter at the southern entrance of Bosphorus, Turkey, and exploded. She caught fire and grounded. Almost all of the tanker's crew members died. The wreck of the Independența burned for weeks, causing heavy air and sea pollution in the Istanbul area and the Sea of Marmara.

== Ship ==
MT Independența was a 1978–built Romanian-flagged crude oil carrier, the biggest ship of her country's commercial fleet at that time. She was 283 m (928 ft 6 in) long, had a beam of 46 m (150 ft 11 in) and a depth of 22 m (72 ft 2 in).

== Loss ==
By mid November 1979, the Independența, carrying 94,000 tons (714,760 barrels) of crude oil from Es Sider, Libya to Constanța, Romania dropped anchor about 4 nautical miles (7.4 km; 4.6 mi) off the Haydarpaşa Breakwater at the southern entrance of the Istanbul Strait. She was waiting for a maritime pilot for the guidance of her 19th passage through the strait. The Greek cargo ship M/V Evriali (10,000 DWT) was transporting 7,400 tons of steel from Mariupol, Ukraine (formerly Zhdanov) to Italy, and had already passed the strait southwards.

Early in the morning of 15 November at 04:35, Evriali collided with Independența, hitting the Romanian ship between the number 3 and 4 tanks, on the starboard side. The Turkish pilot who had helped Evriali navigate the strait, Dincer Sumerkan, had left the Greek ship earlier, instructing them to follow a course at 260 degrees right; however, the Greek cargo ship took a course of 160 degrees left.

The sparks from the collision at 04:35 caused a large explosion on Independența, followed three minutes later by another explosion. A third explosion occurred at 04:47. The Independența ran aground half a mile off the Port of Haydarpaşa. Forty-three members of the tanker's crew lost their lives; only three survived the catastrophic accident. Almost all the victims lost their lives in the water when burning oil on the surface was driven towards the shore by the wind; the sailors who survived had jumped on the other side of the ship, against the wind, being later rescued by boats.

The Turkish Navy immediately attempted to extinguish the fire. However, these efforts had to be abandoned due to the intensity of the fire. The Director of the Sea of Marmara District took over the spill on 19 November, and the Navy withdrew.

The Greek captain of the Evriali, Alekos Adamopulos, 29 years old at that time, was sentenced to 20 months in jail. The difference in time between his arrest and the 20 months was converted into an $850 fine.

The Istanbul Strait remained closed for weeks. The wreck remained in the area for some years until it was broken up and salvaged to a shipyard in Tuzla.

== Investigations ==
The exact cause of accident is not clear, even today. The Romanian shipping company Navrom claimed the insurance payout, amounting to some tens of millions of US dollars. This action resulted in a thorough inspection of the ship's wreck by independent survey teams employed by the insurance company from Lloyd's Register of Shipping, Japan. It was hinted that the incident may have been deliberate sabotage to allow for the collection of insurance money.

== Trial ==
After the accident, the court charged the captain of the Greek ship, Alekos Adamopoulos, and the seven crew with being careless and negligent, disobeying international maritime regulations and jeopardizing security of Istanbul. He was sentenced to 20 months in prison, but was released in view of the seventh months he had spent in jail awaiting trial.

== Pollution ==
From 17 to 27 November, there was slight leakage from the tanker. Another major explosion occurred on board the vessel on the night of 6 December at 10:40 p.m., which resulted in more oil spillage. The slick from the vessel drifted towards the Port of Haydarpaşa, and the booms across its entrance could not prevent approximately 50 tons of oil entering the harbor. The tanker continued to burn until 14 December.

The maximum accumulation of harmful particles in the air during the fire exceeded by four times the permissible limit set for human health. Heavy oil contamination formed on the surface of the sea and on the heavily built-up shores and the recreational beaches of the Sea of Marmara and the Istanbul Strait.

It was estimated that 30,000 tons of crude oil burned and that the remaining 64,000 tons spilled into the sea. Because of the rapid evaporation of the light components, the crude oil quickly sank to the bottom of the sea in an area approximately 5.5 km in diameter.

== Sister ships ==
M/T Independența was the first of a series of five Romanian supertankers which were constructed by Șantierul Naval Constanța in the 1980s. The sister ships were as follows:

M/T Unirea (Union) – broke up and sank at the beginning of the 1980s in Bulgarian waters of the Black Sea. Official reports claim that the accident was caused by a collision with a World War II mine. A different opinion (unofficial) came from some naval architects and marine engineers stating that the ship broke up due to incorrect ballasting (the ship had no cargo at the moment of the accident).

M/T Biruința (Triumph) – owned and managed by the then Romanian state owned Shipping Company (Navrom). In the 1990s the ship was passed to the Romanian private shipping company "Petromin", changing its name to M/T Iris Star. Finally the ship was bought by the Romanian shipping company Histria Shipmanagement having its name changed again to M/T Histria Crown. After an extensive refit in Keppel Shipyard (Singapore) finished in 2009, the ship was converted in into a FPSO (Floating production storage and offloading) and given a new name, Armada Perdana. It is still in use off the coast of Nigeria (Oyo Oil Field) as of 2018.

M/T Libertatea (Liberty) – had the same history (including ownership) as her older sister M/T Biruinta. The ship, known then as M/T Histria Prestige, was broken up in 2005.

M/T Pacea (Peace) – was never fully completed. At the end of the 1980s it was passed to Czechoslovakia as a part of Romania's foreign debt.

== Sister ship's incident ==
The sister ship of Independența, the M/T Iris Star lost power due to engine failure during her passage through the Bosphorus on 27 July 2000, and drifted towards Kandilli point. There was no extensive damage reported.
