= Histria Coral =

History
- Name: Histria Coral
- Owner: Histria Shipmanagement
- Port of registry: Valletta, Malta
- Ordered: 2003
- Builder: Constanța Shipyard
- Yard number: 569
- Launched: 2006
- Completed: 2006
- In service: 2006
- Identification: IMO number: 9301299; MMSI number: 256105000; Callsign: 9HLB8

General characteristics
- Class & type: Oil tanker
- Tonnage: 25,804 GT 40,426 DWT
- Length: 179.88 m (590.2 ft)
- Beam: 32.2 m (106 ft)
- Draft: 11.1 m (36 ft)
- Depth: 16.5 m (54 ft)
- Installed power: 12,360 kW (16,580 hp)
- Speed: 15 kn (17 mph)
- Capacity: 47,803 m^{3}
- Crew: Romanian

Histria Coral is a chemical/oil products tanker owned by the Romanian shipping company Histria Shipmanagement and is registered in Valletta, Malta.

== History ==
Histria Coral was built by the Constanța Shipyard in 2006 as a 40,426 DWT ship used for the transportation of oil and other types of oil products and chemical products. The ship is chartered by the Italian oil and natural gas company Eni.

== Technical description ==
The Histria Coral is equipped with a double hull, one two-stroke acting diesel engine MAN B&W 6S50MC-C with a capacity of 9,480 kW (12,710 hp) directly acting on the propeller shaft and a four-bladed fixed propeller built by Wärtsilä Propulsion Netherlands. It also has another three auxiliary MAN B&W 6L23/30H diesel engines with a capacity of 960 kW (1,290 hp) each. The ship has 14 hydraulically driven centrifugal deepwell Framo cargo pumps, 10 pumps with a capacity of 500 m^{3}/hour, two pumps with a capacity of 200 m^{3}/hour, one pump with a capacity of 100 m^{3}/hour and one portable pump with a capacity of 150 m^{3}/hour.

The ship is equipped with five manifolds, a discharge capacity of 3,000 m^{3}/hour, a cargo handling capacity of 3,750 m^{3}/hour, one Liebherr hose-handling crane with a reach of 22 m (72 ft), an Alfa Lawal JWSP-26-C100 freshwater conversion plant with a capacity of 30 m^{3}/day and a Jowa Bio STP3 sewage-treatment plant capable of sustaining 34 people. The ship has ten cargo tanks, two tanks with a capacity of 3,550 m^{3}, four tanks with a capacity of 4,900 m^{3}, four tanks with a capacity of 5,100 m^{3} and two slop tanks with a capacity of 1,000 m^{3}.
