= MV Azov Concord =

Turkish general cargo ship

History

Turkey
- Name: Azov Concord
- Owner: Albros Shipping & Trading
- Port of registry: Valletta, Malta
- Builder: Gelibolu Shipyard
- Launched: 1 March 2008
- Identification: IMO number: 9387748; MMSI number: 249323000; Callsign: 9HPL9

General characteristics
- Class & type: General cargo ship
- Tonnage: 8,975 DWT; 6,483 GT
- Length: 141 m (462 ft 7 in)
- Beam: 18 m (59 ft 1 in)
- Installed power: 3145 KW

MV Azov Concord is a Turkish-owned general cargo ship which was the first foreign ship to depart the port of Mariupol since the start of the 2022 Russian invasion of Ukraine.

== Description ==
Azov Concord is a general cargo ship with a gross tonnage of 6,483 GT and summer deadweight of 8,975 DWT. It is 141 metres (463 ft) long, has a beam of 18 metres (59 ft), and its engine produces 3,145 KW of power.

== History ==
In February 2022, Azov Concord was in port in Mariupol when the 2022 Russian invasion of Ukraine broke out. The escalation in hostilities trapped the ship in the port city, along with five other foreign-flagged merchant ships, for months. During this time, the ship sustained damages as a result of the siege of Mariupol which were eventually repaired.

By May, talks between Russia and Turkey were underway to establish a maritime corridor in the Black Sea in order to allow Turkish merchant ships, including Azov Concord, to export essential goods including grain from Russian-occupied Ukraine. During this time, the port of Mariupol fell and was occupied by Russian forces. On 22 June, Russian media and Turkey's defense ministry announced that the Azov Concord was the first foreign ship to leave the port of Mariupol since the invasion began. The vessel made for the port of Novorossiysk in southern Russia, where it anchored later that day. However, the vessel did not appear to be carrying a cargo of grain or other raw resources when it left Mariupol.
