= Anton Ionescu =

Romanian politician (1939–2023)

Anton Ionescu (10 December 1939 – 7 March 2023) was a Romanian politician who served two terms as a Deputy for Cluj. He was Minister of Transport in 1998.

Ionescu graduated in 1961 with a degree in civil engineering from the Technical University of Cluj-Napoca. After working as an engineer, he started teaching at the Technical University in 1972, became a professor in 1980, served as Dean from 1990 to 1996, and retired in 2007.
