= Victor Ciutacu =

Romanian journalist

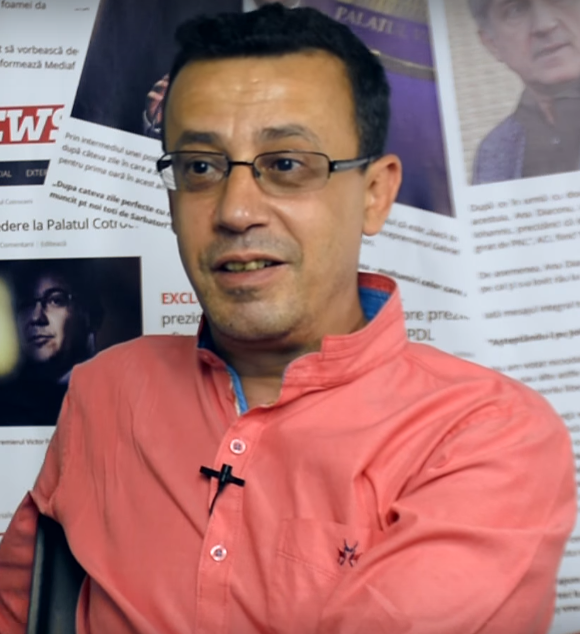
- Victor Ciutacu in 2013
- Born: May 15, 1970 (age 56); Sinaia, Prahova, Romania
- Education: Politehnica University of Bucharest
- Occupation: Journalist
- Years active: 1993–present
- Children: 1

Victor Ciutacu (born 15 May 1970 in Sinaia) is a Romanian journalist and political commentator, the former chief editor of the daily newspaper Jurnalul Naţional and also the former host of the talk show Vorbe grele which was broadcast by Antena 3. He joined Romania TV in 2013, where his show, Punctul culminant, achieved great success.

== Personal life ==
Despite the fact that his mother is of Ukrainian-Jewish descent, Ciutacu was baptised as an Orthodox Christian and he practices the faith.
