= Biruința (ship) =

History
- Name: Histria Crown
- Port of registry: Malta
- Builder: Constanța Shipyard
- Completed: 1984
- Identification: IMO number: 8302131; MMSI number: 352916000; Callsign: 3EQU8
- Status: Active

General characteristics
- Class & type: crude oil tanker
- Tonnage: 164,004 dwt
- Length: 298.00 m (977.69 ft)
- Beam: 46.00 m (150.92 ft)
- Draft: 17.40 m (57.1 ft)
- Depth: 22.5 m
- Capacity: 160,698 m^{3}

Biruința (Romanian equivalent for Triumph), renamed Iris Star and later Histria Crown, is a Romanian crude oil tanker.

== History ==
MT Biruința was one of the biggest ships of the Romanian commercial fleet, owned and managed by the then Romanian state owned Shipping Company (Navrom). It was sold after the Romanian Revolution of 1989, and six years of service, to the Romanian private shipping company "Petromin", changing its name to M/T Iris Star. The ship was then bought by the Romanian shipping company Histria Shipmanagement having its name changed again to M/T Histria Crown, in 2005.

In 2009, after an extensive refit in Keppel Shipyard (Singapore), the ship was converted into a FPSO (Floating production storage and offloading) and given a new name, Armada Perdana. It was still in use of the coast of Nigeria (Oyo Oil Field), as of 2018. In 2019, the ship was renamed Tamara Tokoni.

== Incidents ==
On July 27, 2000, the ship lost power after an engine failure and drifted towards Kandilli point in Turkey. There was no extensive damage reported.

== Sister ships ==
M/T Biruința was the third of a series of five Romanian supertankers which were constructed by Constanța Shipyard in the 1980s. The sister ships were as follows:

M/T Independența (Independence) – suffered a more deadly accident with a Greek ship (Evriyali) at the southern entrance to the Bosporus. All but three members of the Romanian tanker crew died.

M/T Unirea (Union) – broke up and sank at the beginning of the 1980s in Bulgarian waters of the Black Sea. Official reports claim that the accident was caused by a collision with a World War II mine. A different opinion (unofficial) came from some naval architects and marine engineers stating that the ship broke up due to incorrect ballasting (the ship had no cargo at the moment of the accident).

M/T Libertatea (Liberty) – had the same history (including ownership) as her older sister M/T Biruinta. The ship, known then as M/T Histria Prestige, was broken up in 2005.

M/T Pacea (Peace) – was never fully completed. At the end of the 1980s it was passed to Czechoslovakia as a part of Romania's foreign debt.
