= Histria Shipmanagement =

Romanian shipping company

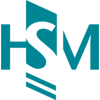
- Company type: Private
- Founded: 1992
- Headquarters: Constanţa, Romania
- Revenue: $282.5 million (2024)
- Owner: RV Berhad
- Number of employees: 1,492 (2024)

Histria Shipmanagement is a Romanian shipping company, the largest in the country, with a fleet of eleven vessels of which ten are oil and chemical tankers and one is a multipurpose vessel.

== Ships ==
- (Malta) Histria Diamond — 89,077 DWT oil tanker
- (Malta) Histria Perla — 40,471 DWT oil and chemical tanker
- (Malta) Histria Coral — 40,426 DWT oil and chemical tanker
- (Malta) Histria Ivory — 40,450 DWT oil and chemical tanker
- (Malta) Histria Agata — 40,416 DWT oil and chemical tanker
- (Malta) Histria Giada — 40,416 DWT oil and chemical tanker
- (Malta) Histria Onyx — 3,102 DWT multipurpose vessel
- (Liberia) Histria Tiger — 40,416 DWT oil and chemical tanker
- (Marshall Islands) Histria Azure — 40,439 DWT oil and chemical tanker
- (Marshall Islands) Histria Prince — 40,416 DWT oil and chemical tanker
- (Romania) Histria Topaz — 39,750 DWT oil and chemical tanker
