= Vorbe grele =

Vorbe grele (in English "Heavy talks") was a TV news talk-show, on the Intact Media Group station Antena 3, hosted by Romanian journalist Victor Ciutacu. The talk-show tackled various economical, political, and social issues that Romania was facing.

Vorbe grele aired its final episode on 22 March 2013.
