= Constanța Shipyard =

Largest shipyard in Romania

Coordinates: 44.1637°N 28.6469°E

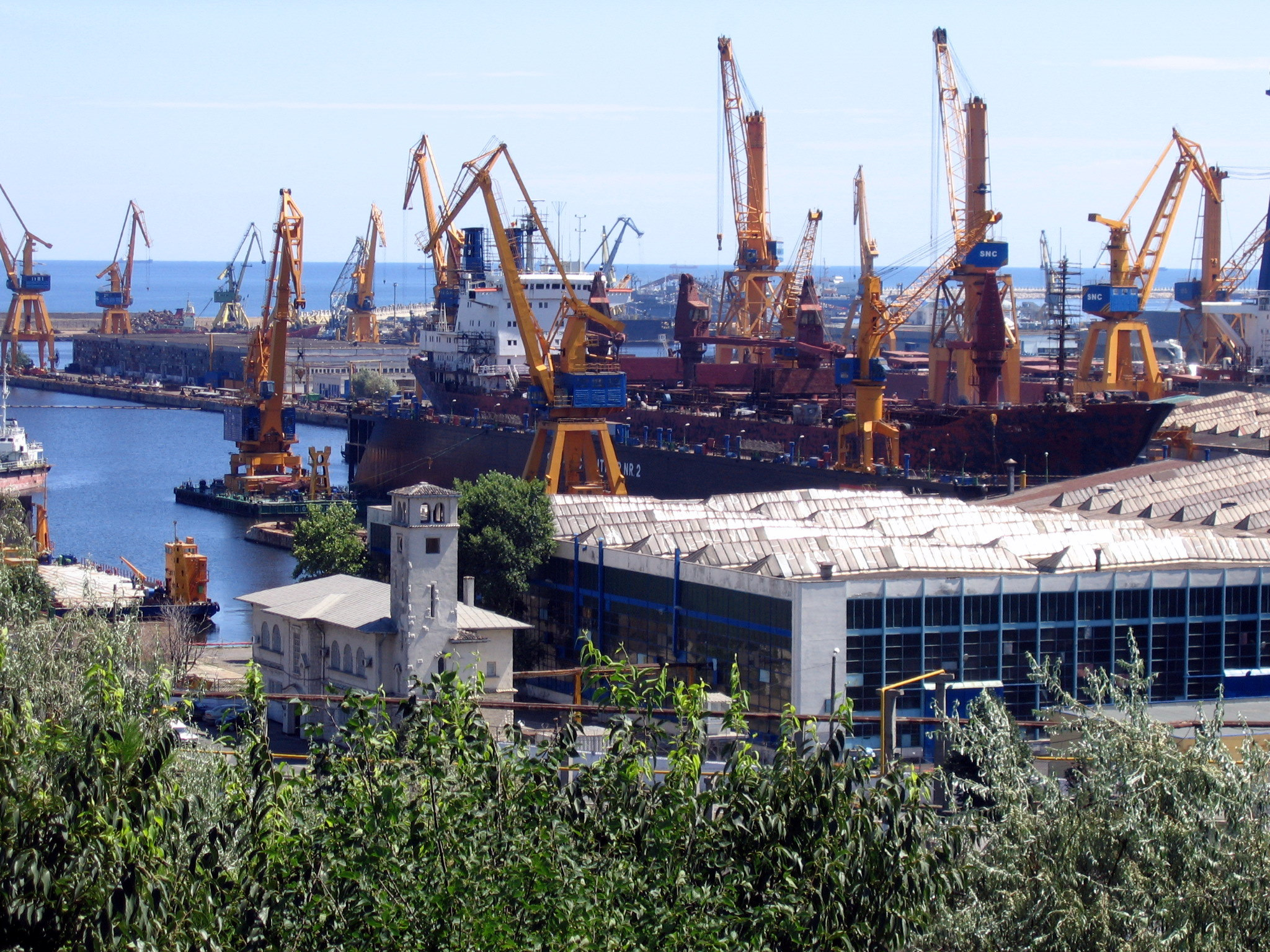
- Traded as: BVB: SNC
- Industry: Ship construction and repair
- Founded: 1892
- Headquarters: Constanța, Romania
- Key people: Gheorghe Bosânceanu, President
- Products: Ships
- Revenue: ▲US$ 200 million (2008)
- Net income: ▲US$ 1 million (2008)
- Number of employees: 2,300 (2008)
- Parent: Histria Group
- Website: www.snc.ro

Shipyards of Romania

Constanța Shipyard (Romanian: Șantierul Naval Constanța) is the largest shipyard in Romania and one of the largest in Europe having a market share of 20% in the Black Sea basin. The shipyard has two drydocks, one used for the construction of ships up to 150,000 tonnes deadweight (DWT), and the second one used for the construction of ships up to 250,000 DWT, and two floating docks with a capacity of 8,000 tonnes and 15,000 tonnes.

== History ==
The Constanța Shipyard was first mentioned as the Craft Repair Shop within the Constanța Harbour area in 1892 by the Ministry for Public Works. In July 1905, the shipyard housed the Russian battleship Potemkin and refloated her after she was half scuttled by her mutinous crew. The first ship ever constructed by the shipyard and launched to sea on May 31, 1936 was a 12 m (39 ft) long yacht named Crai Nou, designed and built by Alexandru Theodoru a student at the Naval School in Constanța and graduate of the French Naval School. During World War II, the shipyard provided repair and maintenance to the Italian flotilla of midget submarines operating in the Black Sea. Together with the Galați shipyard, it also rebuilt, maintained and repaired numerous German R-boats during the War. 1950 the shipyard began to construct ships, pontoons, tugboats and towboats. In 1975 the shipyard constructed one bulk carrier of 54,200 DWT which was the first large ship ever constructed in Romania.

After the construction of a large bulk carrier Giuseppe Lembo in 1994, the shipyard reprofiled its activity to construct only small ships. Only after the privatisation in 2002 the shipyard restarted to construct large-scale ships. In the 114 years of existence the Constanța Shipyard constructed 432 ships, 365 for Romanian shipping companies and 67 for shipping companies from Egypt, Russia, Greece, Japan, Hong Kong, Liechtenstein, Czech Republic, South Africa, Belgium, Germany, Italy, Norway, France, Panama and Netherlands, which have a total of 4,128,143 DWT.
