= Boc cabinets =

Government of Romania, 2008–2009

== First Boc cabinet ==
Boc I
- 118th Cabinet of Romania

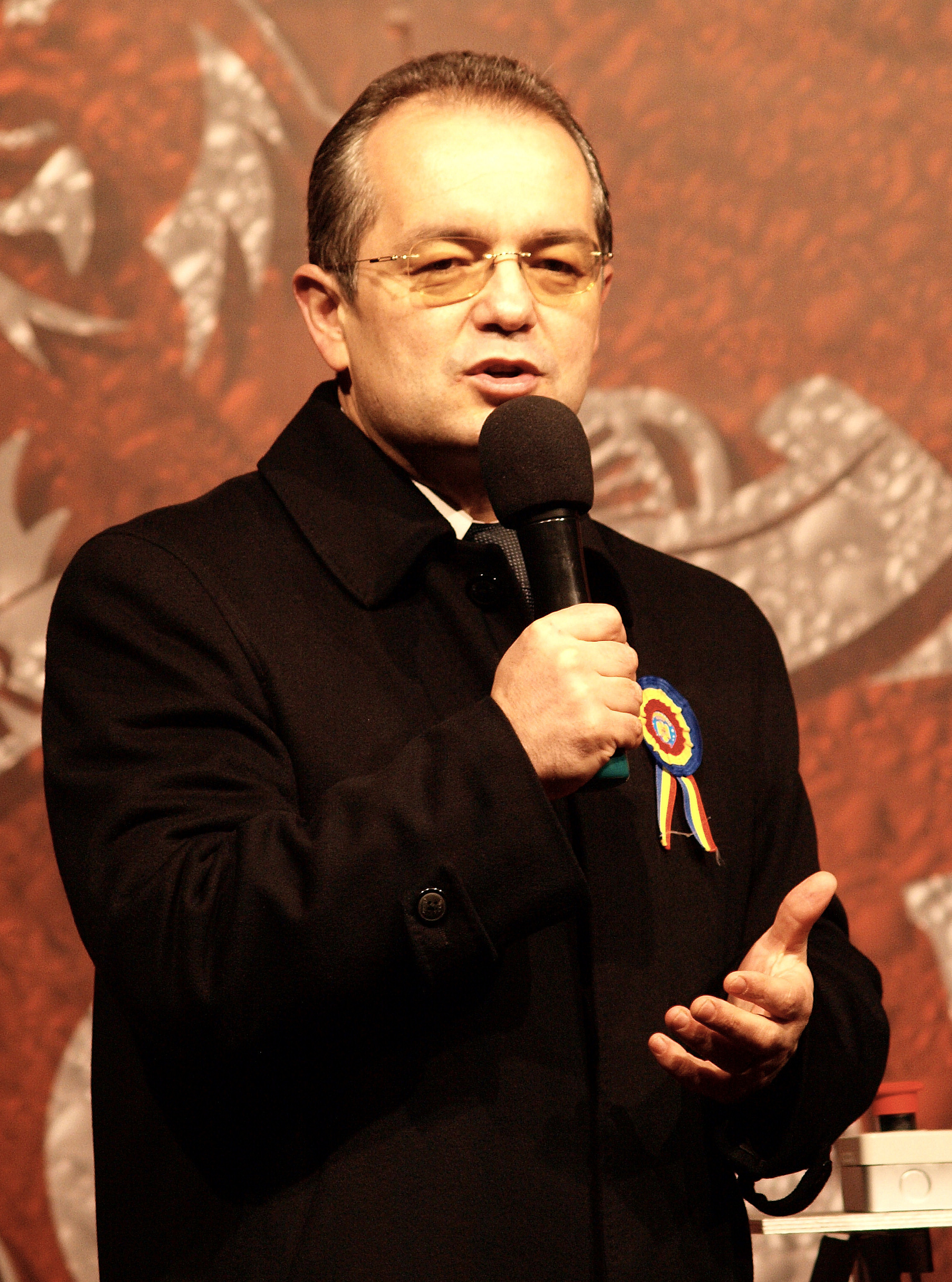
- Date formed: 22 December 2008
- Date dissolved: 23 December 2009

People and organisations
- Head of state: Traian Băsescu
- Head of government: Emil Boc
- Ministers removed: 12
- Total no. of members: 21
- Member party: PD-L, PSD,
- Status in legislature: Coalition
- Opposition party: PNL, UDMR
- Opposition leader: Călin Popescu-Tăriceanu/Crin Antonescu

History
- Election: 30 November 2008
- Outgoing election: –
- Legislature term: 2008–2012
- Budget: one
- Predecessor: Tăriceanu II
- Successor: Boc II

The Boc Cabinet was a coalition cabinet between the largest parliamentary parties, PD-L and the PSD. After the breakup of the legislative coalition, it was known as ”the first Boc Cabinet.” Despite the ambitious governing program, numerous conflicts erupted between the PDL and PSD leaders, each party blaming the other. In particular, president Traian Băsescu and Mircea Geoană, the leader of PSD, competed for the presidential elections in 2009. The coalition cabinet lasted less than one year.

Following the resignation of Liviu Dragnea (PSD) from the office of Minister of Administration and Interior, on 2 February 2009, the Parliament voted to unify the post of Deputy Prime Minister with the post of Minister of Administration and Interior.

On 1 October 2009, following the removal from office of the Deputy Prime Minister, Minister of Administration and Interior, Dan Nica (PSD), all the PSD Ministers resigned from the cabinet. As a result, all their offices were taken, ad interim by the PD-L, for a period no longer than 45 days. The cabinet should have received a new vote from the Parliament, as its political composition was changed. On 13 October 2009, for the first time in the post-communist history, the Parliament adopted a motion of no confidence (”moțiune de cenzură”), and Cabinet Boc was removed. It worked just an acting cabinet, with diminished power. Its term ended on 23 December 2009, when the new cabinet, headed also by Emil Boc received the vote of confidence from the Parliament and was sworn in at Cotroceni Palace. During the interim period, Traian Băsescu nominated repeatedly friendly candidates, despite the fact that the then opposition parties (PNL, PSD, UDMR, and the 18 representatives of the national ethnic minorities), having an absolute majority in both Houses of Parliament, expressed their will to nominate the Mayor of Sibiu Klaus Iohannis as Prime Minister.

Prime Minister	Name	Party	Period
Prime Minister	Emil Boc	Democratic Liberal Party	22 December 2008 – 23 December 2009
Deputy Prime Minister	Name	Party	Period
Deputy Prime Minister	Dan Nica	Social Democratic Party	22 December 2008 – 1 October 2009
Deputy Prime Minister	Vasile Blaga (ad interim)	Democratic Liberal Party	1 October 2009 – 27 November 2009
Minister	Name	Party	Period
Justice and Citizenship Freedoms	Cătălin Predoiu	Independent	22 December 2008 – 23 December 2009
National Defense	Mihai Stănișoară	Democratic Liberal Party	22 December 2008 – 23 December 2009
Culture, Religious Affairs and National Patrimony	Theodor Paleologu	Democratic Liberal Party	22 December 2008 – 23 December 2009
Agriculture and Rural Development	Ilie Sârbu	Social Democratic Party	22 December 2008 – 1 October 2009
Agriculture and Rural Development	Radu Berceanu (ad interim)	Democratic Liberal Party	1 October 2009 – 23 December 2009
Public Health	Ionuț Bazac	Social Democratic Party	22 December 2008 – 1 October 2009
Public Health	Adriean Videanu (ad interim)	Democratic Liberal Party	1 October 2009 – 23 December 2009
Foreign Affairs	Cristian Diaconescu	Social Democratic Party	22 December 2008 – 1 October 2009
Foreign Affairs	Cătălin Predoiu (ad interim)	Independent	1 October 2009 – 23 December 2009
Economy	Adriean Videanu	Democratic Liberal Party	22 December 2008 – 23 December 2009
Public Finance	Gheorghe Pogea	Democratic Liberal Party	22 December 2008 – 23 December 2009
Labor, Family and Social Protection	Marian Sârbu	Social Democratic Party	22 December 2008 – 1 October 2009
Labor, Family and Social Protection	Gheorghe Pogea (ad interim)	Democratic Liberal Party	1 October 2009 – 23 December 2009
Environment and Sustainable Development	Nicolae Nemirschi	Social Democratic Party	22 December 2008 – 1 October 2009
Environment and Sustainable Development	Elena Udrea (ad interim)	Democratic Liberal Party	1 October 2009 – 23 December 2009
Transport and Infrastructure	Radu Berceanu	Democratic Liberal Party	22 December 2008 – 23 December 2009
Administration and Interior	Gabriel Oprea	Social Democratic Party	22 December 2008 – 13 January 2009
Administration and Interior	Dan Nica (ad interim)	Social Democratic Party	13 January 2009 – 20 January 2009
Administration and Interior	Liviu Dragnea	Social Democratic Party	20 January 2009 – 2 February 2009
Administration and Interior	Dan Nica	Social Democratic Party	2 February 2009 – 1 October 2009
Administration and Interior	Vasile Blaga (ad interim)	Democratic Liberal Party	1 October 2009 – 23 December 2009
Regional Development and Housing	Vasile Blaga	Democratic Liberal Party	22 December 2008 – 27 November 2009
Education and Research	Ecaterina Andronescu	Social Democratic Party	22 December 2008 – 1 October 2009
Education and Research	Emil Boc (ad interim)	Democratic Liberal Party	1 October 2009 – 23 December 2009
Youth and Sport	Monica Iacob Ridzi	Democratic Liberal Party	22 December 2008 – 14 July 2009
Youth and Sport	Sorina Luminița Plăcintă	Democratic Liberal Party	14 July 2009 – 23 December 2009
Tourism	Elena Udrea	Democratic Liberal Party	22 December 2008 – 23 December 2009
Communications and Information Society	Gabriel Sandu	Democratic Liberal Party	22 December 2008 – 23 December 2009
Small and Medium Enterprises, Commerce and Business Environment	Constantin Niță	Social Democratic Party	22 December 2008 – 1 October 2009
Small and Medium Enterprises, Commerce and Business Environment	Gabriel Sandu (ad interim)	Democratic Liberal Party	1 October 2009 – 23 December 2009
Minister Delegate	Name	Party	Period
Relations with Parliament	Victor Ponta	Social Democratic Party	22 December 2008 – 1 October 2009
Relations with Parliament	Sorina Luminița Plăcintă (ad interim)	Democratic Liberal Party	1 October 2009 – 23 December 2009

== Proposed Croitoru and Negoiță cabinets ==
The Croitoru-proposed cabinet was Lucian Croitoru's proposal for the cabinet, composed of 14 ministers, listed below. It was proposed on 23 October 2009, and was rejected by the Parliament of Romania on 4 November 2009.

On 15 October 2009, President Traian Băsescu, citing the need for an individual well-versed in economic policy to steer Romania through the ongoing crisis, nominated the politically independent Lucian Croitoru as Prime Minister in place of Emil Boc, whose cabinet fell after losing a motion of no confidence two days earlier. The nomination was backed by the Democratic Liberal Party, which is supporting Băsescu in the upcoming presidential election, but drew criticism from the rest of the parties represented in the Romanian Parliament (the Social Democratic Party, the National Liberal Party, the Democratic Union of Hungarians in Romania and the Parliamentary group of ethnic minorities), which backed Sibiu Mayor Klaus Iohannis for the position, and vowed to challenge Croitoru's nomination at the Constitutional Court or derail it in Parliament. In a meeting with Croitoru on 20 October, the four Parliamentary groups told Croitoru they would not vote for a cabinet headed by him, and asked him to refuse the nomination as prime minister.

On 23 October, Croitoru announced his proposed cabinet, which included 14 ministers, down from 18 in Emil Boc cabinet. There were 7 holdovers, and 7 new names (in addition to Croitoru).

The Ministry of Youth and Sport would be merged with the Ministry of Education and Research and Innovation, the Ministry of Small and Medium Enterprises, Commerce and Business Environment which will be merged with the Ministry of Economy, the Ministry of Tourism which will be merged with the Ministry of Regional Development. Five current ministerial posts (of Youth and Sport, Small and Medium Enterprise, Tourism, Communications, and Relations with Parliament), as well as the post of Deputy Prime Minister would be cancelled.

Prime Minister designate	Name	Party
Prime Minister	Lucian Croitoru	Independent
Minister nomination	Name	Party
Administration and Interior	Emerich Florin Șaghy	Independent
Foreign Affairs	Bogdan Aurescu	Independent
Public Finance	Gheorghe Pogea	Democratic Liberal Party
Justice and Citizenship Freedoms	Cătălin Predoiu	Independent, proposed by Democratic Liberal Party
Education and Research	Daniel Funeriu	Independent
National Defense	Mihai Stănișoară	Democratic Liberal Party
Economy	Adriean Videanu	Democratic Liberal Party
Agriculture and Rural Development	Adrian Rădulescu	Independent
Labor, Family and Social Protection	Mihai Șeitan	Democratic Liberal Party
Transport	Radu Berceanu	Democratic Liberal Party
Regional Development, Housing and Tourism	Vasile Blaga	Democratic Liberal Party
Environment and Sustainable Development	Sulfina Barbu	Democratic Liberal Party
Public Health	Cristian Vlădescu	Independent
Culture, Religious Affairs and National Patrimony	Theodor Paleologu	Democratic Liberal Party

Following the rejection by Parliament of the Croitoru Cabinet, dubbed in the press as the second Boc cabinet without Boc, President Băsescu nominated sector 3 Mayor Liviu Negoiță to form a new government. Due to the fact that the Cabinet structure was identical to, and that most of the ministers where the same as the ones of the first Boc cabinet, and the Croitoru (proposed) Cabinet, this new proposal was nicknamed by the media and analysts The Boc III Cabinet without Boc. This cabinet never received a vote from Parliament, and Negoiță renounced to the mandate days after the run-off of the presidential election, the first Boc cabinet being officially mandated as a caretaker government until a new cabinet would form.

Prime Minister designate	Name	Party
Prime Minister	Liviu Negoiță	Democratic Liberal Party
Minister nomination	Name	Party
Administration and Interior	Gabriel Oprea	Independent
Foreign Affairs	Bogdan Aurescu	Independent
Public Finance	Gheorghe Pogea	Democratic Liberal Party
Justice and Citizenship Freedoms	Cătălin Predoiu	Independent
Education and Research	Daniel Funeriu	Democratic Liberal Party
National Defense	Mihai Stănișoară	Democratic Liberal Party
Economy	Adriean Videanu	Democratic Liberal Party
Agriculture and Rural Development	Valeriu Tabără	Democratic Liberal Party
Labor, Family and Social Protection	Mihai Șeitan	Democratic Liberal Party
Transport	Radu Berceanu	Democratic Liberal Party
Regional Development, Housing and Tourism	Vasile Blaga	Democratic Liberal Party
Environment and Sustainable Development	Sulfina Barbu	Democratic Liberal Party
Public Health	Anton Cristian Irimie	Democratic Liberal Party
Culture, Religious Affairs and National Patrimony	Theodor Paleologu	Democratic Liberal Party

== Second Boc cabinet ==
Boc II
- 119th Cabinet of Romania

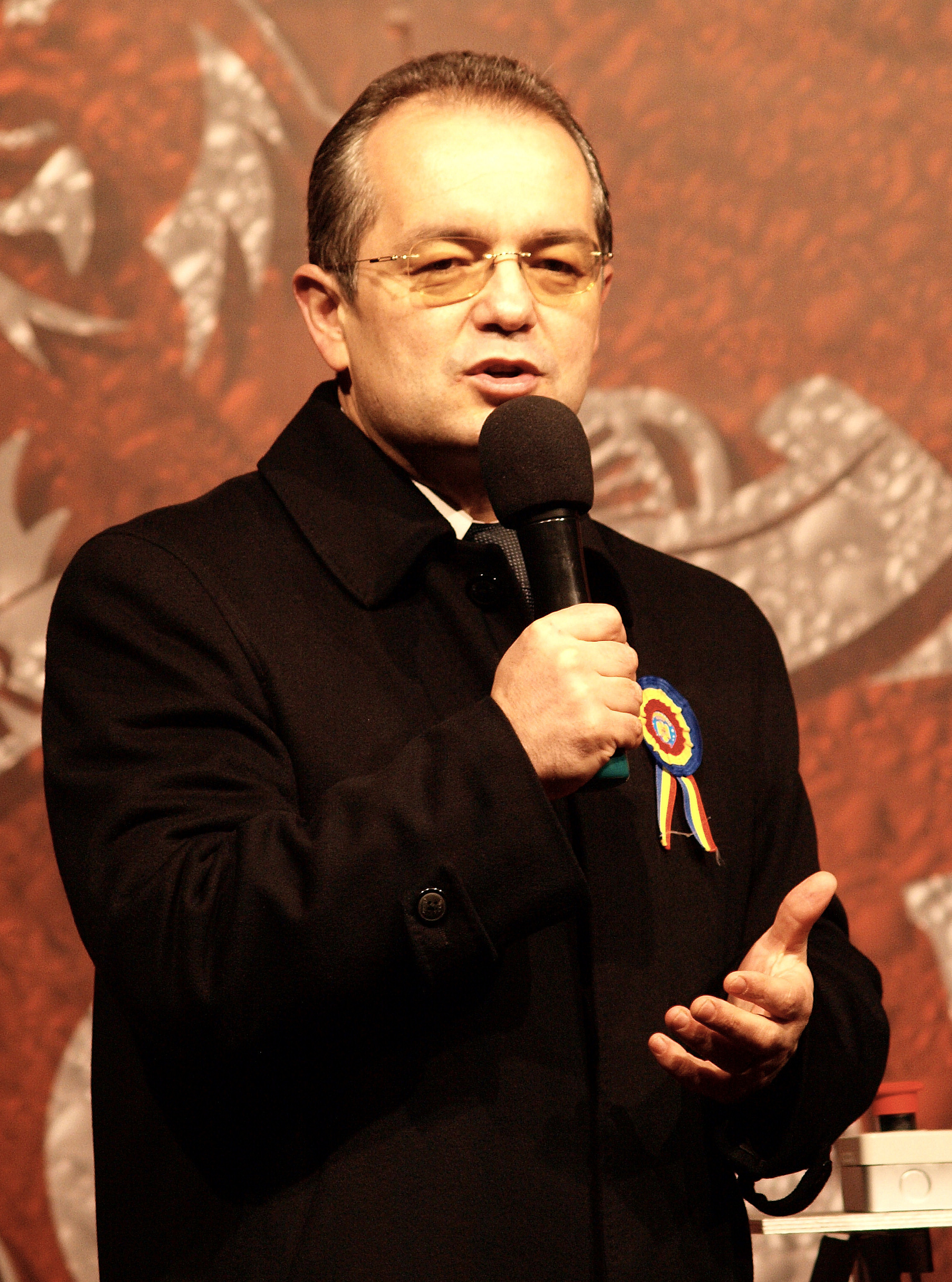
- Date formed: 23 December 2009
- Date dissolved: 6 February 2012

People and organisations
- Head of state: Traian Băsescu
- Head of government: Emil Boc
- Head of government's history: Cătălin Predoiu
- No. of ministers: 18
- Ministers removed: 11
- Total no. of members: 29
- Member party: PD-L, UDMR, UNPR
- Status in legislature: Coalition
- Opposition party: PNL, PSD, PC
- Opposition leader: Crin Antonescu, Mircea Geoană/Victor Ponta

History
- Incoming formation: Emil Boc, Béla Markó, Vasile Blaga, Sebastian Vlădescu, Adriean Videanu, Teodor Baconschi, Radu Berceanu, László Borbély, Elena Udrea, Gabriel Oprea, Hunor Kelemen, Cătălin Predoiu, Gabriel Sandu, Mihai Șeitan, Daniel Funeriu, Attila Cseke, Mihai Dumitru
- Election: 30 November 2008
- Legislature term: 2008–2012
- Budget: two
- Predecessor: Boc I
- Successor: Ungureanu

On 23 December 2009 the new Boc Cabinet received, by a narrow margin, the vote of confidence of the Parliament, and was sworn in at Cotroceni later that day. The Government formed was a coalition government between the Democratic Liberal Party and the Democratic Union of Hungarians in Romania. It also received the (traditional) vote of the national minorities group in the Chamber of Deputies and of the two controversial groups of independents in both houses (Chamber of Deputies and Senate) of Parliament.

On 3 September 2010, Emil Boc announced a Cabinet reshuffle, replacing six Ministers. Due to the way the reshuffle was implemented, after two days of meetings and discussions, the media continued, albeit without any legal basis, the numbering of the reshuffled Cabinet as Boc V, the current Boc II Cabinet being dubbed by the press and civil society as Boc IV.

On 6 February 2012, he resigned from office, on the background of long ongoing street protests.

The members of the cabinet are listed below.

Prime Minister	Name	Party	Took office	Left office
Prime Minister	Emil Boc	Democratic Liberal Party	23 December 2009	6 February 2012
Prime Minister	Cătălin Predoiu	Independent	6 February 2012	9 February 2012
Deputy Prime Minister	Name	Party	Took office	Left office
Deputy Prime-Minister	Béla Markó	Democratic Union of Hungarians in Romania	23 December 2009	9 February 2012
Minister	Name	Party	Took office	Left office
Minister of Administration and Interior	Vasile Blaga	Democratic Liberal Party	23 December 2009	27 September 2010
Minister of Administration and Interior	Traian Igaș	Democratic Liberal Party	27 September 2010	9 February 2012
Minister of Public Finance	Sebastian Vlădescu	Independent	23 December 2009	3 September 2010
Minister of Public Finance	Gheorghe Ialomițeanu	Democratic Liberal Party	3 September 2010	9 February 2012
Minister of Economy, Commerce and Business Environment	Adriean Videanu	Democratic Liberal Party	23 December 2009	3 September 2010
Minister of Economy, Commerce and Business Environment	Ion Ariton	Democratic Liberal Party	3 September 2010	9 February 2012
Minister of European Affairs	Leonard Orban	Independent	20 September 2011	9 February 2012
Minister of Foreign Affairs	Teodor Baconschi	Democratic Liberal Party	23 December 2009	24 January 2012
Minister of Foreign Affairs	Cristian Diaconescu	National Union for the Progress of Romania	24 January 2012	9 February 2012
Minister of Transport and Infrastructure	Radu Berceanu	Democratic Liberal Party	23 December 2009	3 September 2010
Minister of Transport and Infrastructure	Anca Boagiu	Democratic Liberal Party	3 September 2010	9 February 2012
Minister of Environment and Forests	László Borbély	Democratic Union of Hungarians in Romania	23 December 2009	9 February 2012
Minister of Regional Development and Tourism	Elena Udrea	Democratic Liberal Party	23 December 2009	9 February 2012
Minister of National Defense	Gabriel Oprea	National Union for the Progress of Romania	23 December 2009	9 February 2012
Minister of Culture and National Patrimony	Hunor Kelemen	Democratic Union of Hungarians in Romania	23 December 2009	9 February 2012
Minister of Justice	Cătălin Predoiu	Independent	23 December 2009	9 February 2012
Minister of Communications and Information Society	Gabriel Sandu	Democratic Liberal Party	23 December 2009	3 September 2010
Minister of Communications and Information Society	Valerian Vreme	Democratic Liberal Party	3 September 2010	9 February 2012
Minister of Labor, Family and Social Protection	Mihai Șeitan	Democratic Liberal Party	23 December 2009	3 September 2010
Minister of Labor, Family and Social Protection	Ioan Botiș	Democratic Liberal Party	3 September 2010	9 April 2011
Minister of Labor, Family and Social Protection	Emil Boc (ad interim)	Democratic Liberal Party	19 April 2011	3 June 2011
Minister of Labor, Family and Social Protection	Sebastian Lăzăroiu	Democratic Liberal Party	3 June 2011	19 September 2011
Minister of Labor, Family and Social Protection	Sulfina Barbu	Democratic Liberal Party	19 September 2011	9 February 2012
Minister of Education, Research, Innovation, Youth and Sport	Daniel Funeriu	Democratic Liberal Party	23 December 2009	9 February 2012
Minister of Health	Attila Cseke	Democratic Union of Hungarians in Romania	23 December 2009	17 August 2011
Minister of Health	Ladislau Ritli	Democratic Union of Hungarians in Romania	17 August 2011	9 February 2012
Minister of Agriculture and Rural Development	Mihai Dumitru	Independent	23 December 2009	3 September 2010
Minister of Agriculture and Rural Development	Valeriu Tabără	Democratic Liberal Party	3 September 2010	9 February 2012
