= First Tăriceanu cabinet =

Tăriceanu I
- 116th Cabinet of Romania

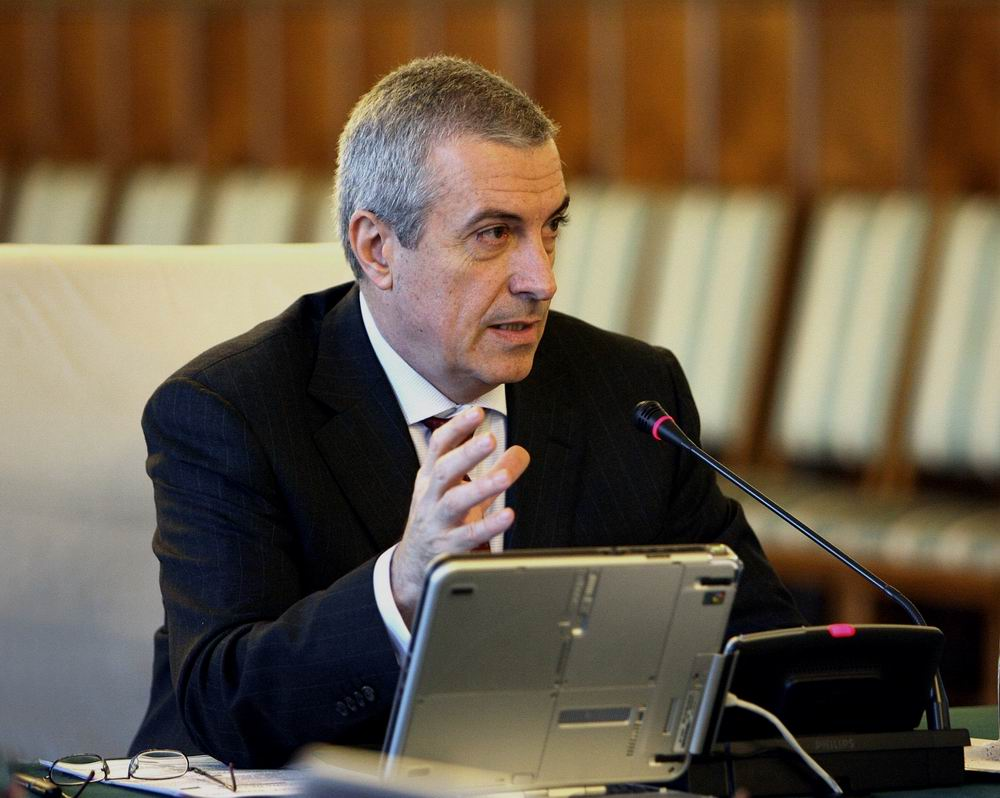
- Date formed: 29 December 2004
- Date dissolved: 5 April 2007

People and organisations
- Head of state: Traian Băsescu
- Head of government: Călin Popescu-Tăriceanu
- Ministers removed: 11
- Total no. of members: 19
- Member party: PNL, PD, PUR/PC, UDMR
- Status in legislature: Coalition (majority)
- Opposition party: PSD, PRM
- Opposition leader: Mircea Geoană, Corneliu Vadim Tudor

History
- Election: 28 November 2004
- Outgoing election: 2008
- Legislature term: 2004–2008
- Budget: Three
- Predecessor: Năstase
- Successor: Tăriceanu II

The first Tăriceanu cabinet was the cabinet of the government of Romania led by former PNL leader Călin Popescu-Tăriceanu between 29 December 2004 and 5 April 2007. It succeeded the Năstase cabinet and was succeeded by the second Tăriceanu cabinet.

It was a coalition government which was formed by the National Liberal Party (PNL), the Democratic Party (PD), the Democratic Alliance of Hungarians in Romania (UDMR), and the Romanian Humanist Party/Conservative Party (PUR/PC).

Additionally, it also consisted of three Ministers of State (one for each party of the coalition, except for the National Liberal Party, which held the position of Prime Minister), 15 Ministers, and 6 Ministers Delegate.

In early December 2006, the Conservative Party withdrew from the coalition. As a result, the Conservative Party's Minister Delegate post was dissolved and the other Conservative Party's posts were re-shuffled between the National Liberal Party (PNL) and the Democratic Party (PD).

Prime Minister	Name	Party	Period
Prime Minister	Călin Popescu-Tăriceanu	National Liberal Party	Dec 29, 2004 – Apr 5, 2007
Minister of State	Name	Party	Period
Co-ordinating the Economic Domain	Adriean Videanu	PD	Dec 29, 2004 – 2005
Co-ordinating the Economic Domain	Gheorghe Seculici	PD	2005 – Aug 22, 2005
Co-ordinating the Economic Domain	Gheorghe Pogea	PD	Aug 22, 2005 – Apr 5, 2007
Co-ordinating the Business, and Small and Medium Enterprises Domain	George Copos	PUR/PC	Dec 29, 2004 – Jun 2006
Co-ordinating the Business, and Small and Medium Enterprises Domain	Bogdan Pascu	PUR/PC	Jul 2006 – Dec 4, 2006
Co-ordinating Culture, Education, European Integration	Béla Markó	Democratic Alliance of Hungarians in Romania	Dec 29, 2004 – Apr 5, 2007
Minister	Name	Party	Period
Justice	Monica Macovei	Ind.	Dec 29, 2004 – Apr 5, 2007
Public Finance	Ionel Popescu	National Liberal Party	Dec 29, 2004 – Aug 22, 2005
Public Finance	Sebastian Vlădescu	National Liberal Party	Aug 22, 2005 – Apr 4, 2007
Labor, Social Solidarity and Family	Gheorghe Barbu	PD	Dec 29, 2004 – Apr 5, 2007
European Integration	Ene Dinga	PD	Dec 29, 2004 – Aug 22, 2005
European Integration	Anca Boagiu	PD	Aug 22, 2005 – Apr 4, 2007
Foreign Affairs	Mihai Răzvan Ungureanu	National Liberal Party	Dec 28, 2004 – Mar 12, 2007
Foreign Affairs	Călin Popescu-Tăriceanu (ad interim)	National Liberal Party	Mar 12, 2007 – Apr 4, 2007
Administration and Interior	Vasile Blaga	PD	Dec 29, 2004 – Apr 5, 2007
Economy and Commerce	Codruț Șereș	PUR/PC	Dec 29, 2004 – Dec 2006
Economy and Commerce	Varujan Vosganian	National Liberal Party	Jan 2007 – Apr 4, 2007
National Defense	Teodor Atanasiu	National Liberal Party	Dec 29, 2004 – Oct 25, 2006
National Defense	Sorin Frunzăverde	PD	Oct 25, 2006 – Apr 5, 2007
Agriculture, Forests and Rural Development	Gheorghe Flutur	National Liberal Party	Dec 29, 2004 – Nov 2006
Agriculture, Forests and Rural Development	Dan Motreanu	National Liberal Party	Nov 2006 – Apr 5, 2007
Transport, Constructions and Tourism	Gheorghe Dobre	PD	Dec 29, 2004 – Aug 22, 2005
Transport, Constructions and Tourism	Radu Berceanu	PD	Aug 22, 2005 – Apr 5, 2007
Education and Research	Mircea Miclea	PD	Dec 29, 2004 – Aug 22, 2005
Education and Research	Mihail Hărdău	PD	Aug 22, 2005 – Apr 5, 2007
Ministry of Culture and National Identity	Mona Muscă	National Liberal Party	Dec 29, 2004 – Aug 22, 2005
Ministry of Culture and National Identity	Adrian Iorgulescu	National Liberal Party	Aug 22, 2005 – Apr 5, 2007
Health	Mircea Cinteză	National Liberal Party	Dec 29, 2004 – Aug 22, 2005
Health	Eugen Nicolăescu	National Liberal Party	Aug 22, 2005 – Apr 5, 2007
Communications and Information Technology	Zsolt Nagy	Democratic Alliance of Hungarians in Romania	Dec 29, 2004 – Apr 5, 2007
Environment and Waters Management	Sulfina Barbu	PD	Dec 29, 2004 – Apr 5, 2007
Minister Delegate	Name	Party	Period
General Secretariat of the Government	Mihai Voicu	National Liberal Party	Dec 29, 2004 – Mar 2006
General Secretariat of the Government	Radu Stroe	National Liberal Party	Mar. 2006 – Apr 5, 2007
International Financing Programs and European Community Acquis	Cristian David	National Liberal Party	Dec 29, 2004 – Apr 5, 2007
Control	Sorin Vicol	PUR/PC	Dec 29, 2004 – Jan 2005
Relations with Parliament	Bogdan Olteanu	National Liberal Party	Dec 29, 2004 – Mar 2006
Relations with Parliament	Mihai Voicu	National Liberal Party	Mar. 2006 – Apr 5, 2007
Public Works and Territorial Improvement	László Borbély	Democratic Alliance of Hungarians in Romania	Dec 29, 2004 – Apr 5, 2007
Commerce	Iuliu Winkler	Democratic Alliance of Hungarians in Romania	Dec 29, 2004 – Apr 5, 2007
