= Béla Markó =

Romanian politician (born 1951)

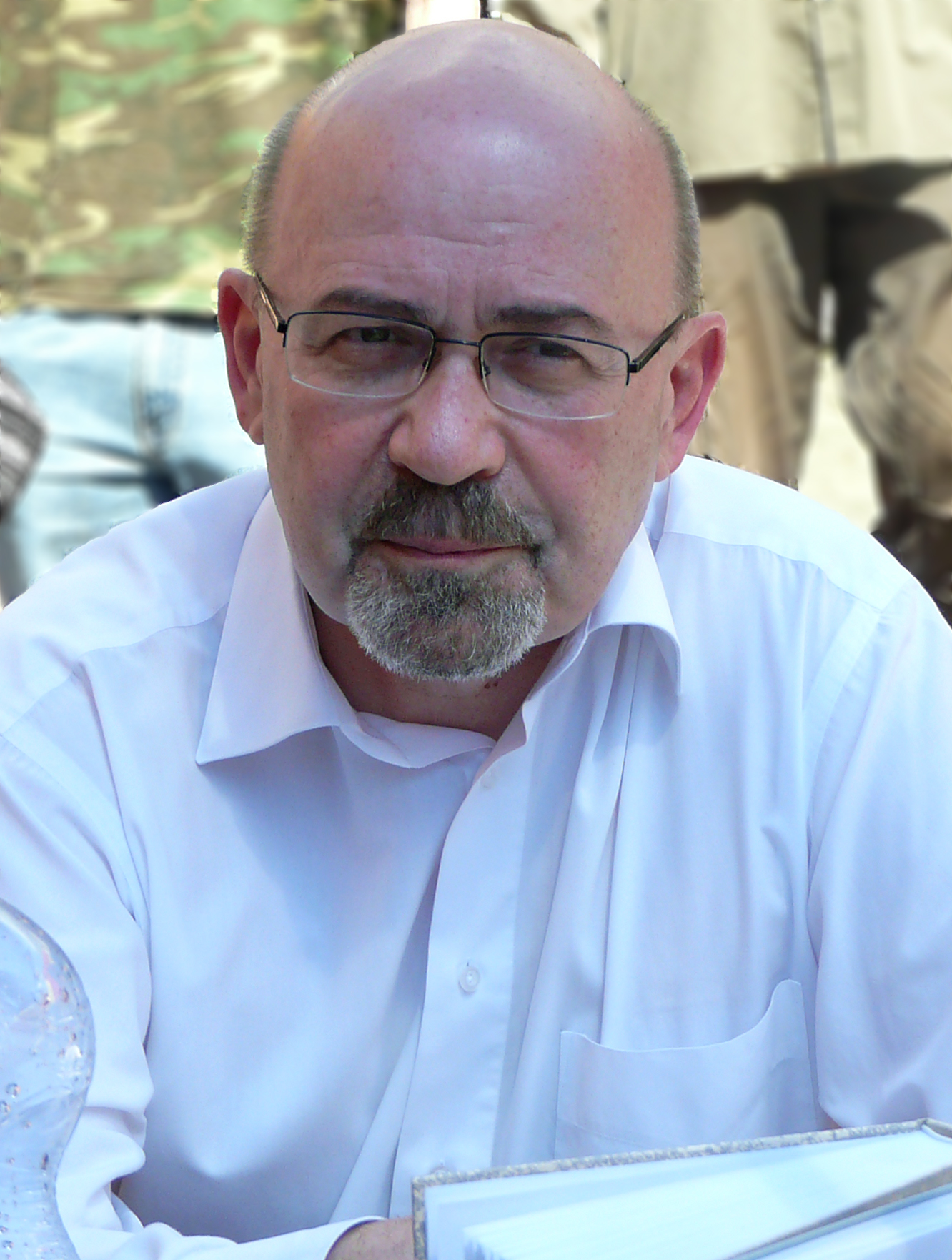
- Markó in 2010

Deputy Prime Minister of Romania
- In office 23 December 2009 – 7 May 2012
- President: Traian Băsescu
- Prime Minister: Emil Boc; Cătălin Predoiu (acting); Mihai Răzvan Ungureanu
- Preceded by: Vasile Blaga (acting)
- Succeeded by: Florin Georgescu

President of the Democratic Alliance of Hungarians in Romania
- In office 1993 – February 2011
- Preceded by: Géza Domokos
- Succeeded by: Hunor Kelemen

Minister of State of Romania
- In office 29 December 2004 – 3 July 2007
- President: Traian Băsescu; Nicolae Văcăroiu; Traian Băsescu
- Prime Minister: Călin Popescu-Tăriceanu

Personal details
- Born: 8 September 1951 (age 75) Târgu Secuiesc, Romania
- Party: Democratic Alliance of Hungarians in Romania (UDMR)

Béla Markó (Note: Romanian pronunciation: [ˈbela ˈmarko]; Hungarian pronunciation: [ˈbeːlɒ ˈmɒrkoː]) (born 8 September 1951) is a Romanian politician and writer of Hungarian ethnicity. He is married with three children. He is reportedly, a follower of reformed Christianity. The former leader of the Democratic Alliance of Hungarians in Romania (UDMR), he was also the Deputy Prime Minister of Romania in the second cabinet of Emil Boc from 2009 to 2012; he had also been Minister of State in the first cabinet of Călin Popescu-Tăriceanu between 2004 and 2007, in charge of culture, education and research and European integration.

Markó has been a senator since 1990, and was the leader of the UDMR from 1993 to 2011. He competed in the 2004 Romanian presidential election, and ranked fourth with 5.1% of the votes.

== Political activity ==
In December 1989, Béla Markó became a founding member and vice-president of the Hungarian Democratic Union of Romania, from Mureș, being elected as a member of the HDUR's Presidium (1990–1991). Although he believed at the time that this was a temporary commitment and that he left the writing only for a short time, he continued to be proactive in political activity.

After the parliamentary elections of May 1990, he was elected as Senator of Mureș, from the HDUR's lists, being re-elected in all subsequent legislatures (formed after the elections of 1992, 1996, 2000, and 2004). In the first term, he was a member of the Senate Culture and Education Commissions, a member of the Steering Committee of the Romanian Group of the Interparliamentary Union (1990–1992) and the president of the HDUR group in the Senate (1991–1992). In the course of his parliamentary activity, Béla Markó was a member of the parliamentary groups of friendship with the Italian Republic and the French-Senate.

As a senator, he has been a member of the Committees for Foreign Affairs and Culture of the Romanian Senate (1992–1996), a member of the Committee on Foreign Policy and of the Committee on Education, Science and Youth (1996–2000), a member of the Committee on Foreign Policy (2000–2004) and the member of the Committee on Foreign Policy (2004–2008) and the member of the Committee on Culture, Art and Mass Media (December 2004–March 2005).

In 1993, Béla Markó was elected president of the Hungarian Democratic Union of Romania (DAHR), being re-elected to this position in the elections of 1995, 1999, 2003, and 2007.

Béla Markó was the HDUR's candidate for the Romanian presidential elections on 28 November 2004, obtaining 533,446 of votes, representing 5.10% of the number of valid votes (took the 4th position).

On 29 December 2004, Béla Markó was appointed as Deputy Prime Minister in the Tăriceanu Government and at the same time Minister of State without portfolio, to coordinate the activities in the field of European culture, education and integration. He resigned on 3 July 2007, in order to be able to coordinate the HDUR's election campaign (European Parliamentary elections of November 2007, the local elections of June 2008 and the parliamentary elections of autumn 2008), but also as a result of the referendum for Trăian Băsescu resignation. I resigned not to lose the elections … I wanted to prevent a failure, he explained. Among his achievements as a minister of state, he listed several "extremely important things for the country": joining the EU, allocating higher education amounts to the budget as it was before, as well as relaunching education infrastructure. In the 2008–2012 legislature, Béla Markó was a member of the parliamentary groups of friendship with the Russian Federation and the French-Senate. In the 2008–2012 legislature, Béla Markó initiated 5 legislative proposals out of which 4 were enacted laws. On 23 December 2009, he was re-elected as Deputy Prime Minister in the Boc Cabinets. He continued his mandate after Boc's resignation, on 6 February 2012, in the Ungureanu cabinet. It was replaced on 7 May 2012, following the dismissal by censure motion of the cabinet. At the parliamentary elections of 2012, he obtained a new term of senator in the electoral district no. 28 from Mureș, on the uninominal college 2.

== Electoral history ==
=== Presidential elections ===
Election	Affiliation	First round			Second round		
Election	Affiliation	Votes	Percentage	Position	Votes	Percentage	Position
2004	UDMR	533,446	5.1%	4th			
