= Gheorghe Pogea =

Romanian engineer and politician

Gheorghe Pogea (born 21 December 1955) is a Romanian engineer and politician. A member of the Democratic Liberal Party (PDL), in the Călin Popescu-Tăriceanu cabinet he was Minister of State Co-ordinating the Economic Domain from August 2005 to June 2006, and in the Emil Boc cabinet, he was Minister of Finance from 2008 to 2009, also serving as interim Minister of Labour in 2009.

He is married and has two children.

== Biography ==
In 1981, Pogea graduated from the Materials Science and Engineering Faculty of the Polytechnic Institute of Bucharest. He also holds a doctorate in the same field. After graduation, he was sent to work at Siderurgica Hunedoara, a steel foundry. In 1989, the ruling Romanian Communist Party (PCR) sent him to the Timișoara party school; after finishing second in his class that October, he was named secretary for economic affairs in Hunedoara. During that December's revolution, the insurgents who entered his office were surprised to find only stacks of paper inside, instead of luxury goods, and a number of individuals anonymously stated that he was the only PCR activist to help them out during those days. However, factory employees recalled he was on the premises at the time, urging employees to "stop this nonsense about a Revolution". Following the revolution, he continued working at the foundry, remaining until 1991 as a section chief, which he had been since 1981; then from 1992 to 1993 as adviser to the director; and afterwards as chief of technical services. From 1997 to 2001, when he was replaced, Pogea directed the foundry, where he acquired a reputation for insisting on total control, and where he conducted a restructuring that saw several thousand people leave the firm. He has also directed two Simeria marble producers: Marmosim from 2001 to 2004 and Titan Mar from 2006 to 2008; both of these are largely owned by Adriean Videanu.

In October 2000, Pogea entered the Democratic Party (PD; later evolved into the PD-L), the first party he entered after 1989. He ran for a Senate seat in the election the following month, but barely lost. In 2000, he was elected head of the Hunedoara chapter of the PD; soon after, he won the chairmanship of the Hunedoara County chapter, heading it from 2000 to 2006. He was also county councillor there for several months. In 2004, he co-authored the electoral manifesto of the Justice and Truth Alliance, which won the November elections. He was also strategy coordinator for the new PDL, and co-authored its programme for the 2008 election. Between 2005 and 2006, he served in the Tăriceanu cabinet, until being compelled to resign by party leader Boc and President Traian Băsescu, partly as a means of putting pressure on Tăriceanu's PNL. He was then offered the position of Bucharest city manager, but declined, returning instead to the marble business. He became Finance Minister when the Boc executive came into office following the 2008 election. The beginning of his term coincided with the onset of the 2008 financial crisis in Romania, leading him to vow a rewrite of the state budget with up to 15% cuts in salaries for government employees, and to warn that Romania's GDP could fall by 6.5% in 2009. He also promised a complete rewrite of the fiscal code, aiming to make it simpler and more transparent, and reduce the number of taxes on businesses and individuals. In October 2009, he became interim Labour Minister following the resignation of his PSD cabinet colleagues, including Marian Sârbu, the previous occupant of that ministry, holding the portfolio until December. His ministerial term ended when he was not reappointed to a new cabinet under Boc at the end of 2009. In August 2013, he was named director of CrisTim, a producer of cold meats.
