= Liviu Negoiță =

Romanian politician and lawyer

Liviu Gheorghe Negoiță

Mayor of Sector 3
- In office June 2004 – June 2012
- Succeeded by: Robert Negoiță

Member of the Chamber of Deputies
- In office December 1996 – June 2004
- Constituency: 42 – București

Personal details
- Born: 22 March 1962 (age 64) Brăila, Romania
- Party: People's Movement Party (2020–present)
- Other political affiliations: Democratic Party (before 2007); Democratic Liberal Party (2007–2014)
- Spouse: Carmen Negoiță
- Education: University of Bucharest
- Profession: Lawyer, Politician
- Website: www.liviunegoita.ro

Liviu Gheorghe Negoiță (born 22 March 1962) is a Romanian politician and lawyer, member of the Democratic Liberal Party (PDL) and the former mayor of Bucharest's Sector 3.

== Biography ==
Born in Brăila, Negoiță completed his law degree in 1990, at University of Bucharest's Faculty of Law and was a practising lawyer. Aside from Romanian, he speaks English and Italian. He married Carmen in 2005, his wedding godfather being Adriean Videanu, a leader of his party.

== Political career ==
=== Member of the Chamber of Deputies ===
Negoiță won a seat in the Chamber of Deputies of Romania in the 1996 Romanian legislative election on the lists of National Liberal Party – Democratic Convention. In 1998, he resigned from the National Liberal Party (PNL) and joined the Democratic Party (PD). In the 2000 elections, he was re-elected on the lists of the Democratic Party, being a deputy until 2004.

=== Mayor of Bucharest's Sector 3 ===
Liviu Negoiță was the candidate of the Democratic Party for mayor of Bucharest's Sector 3, Bucharest's most populous sector, winning the 2004 elections, keeping his seat after he won the 2008 local elections with 79.05%. During his management, the town hall built 300 playgrounds and a large number of parking spaces. He lost the elections in 2012.

=== Candidate for Prime-Minister ===
After the fall of the Boc government, Băsescu designated Lucian Croitoru as Prime-Minister, but the parliamentary majority voted against him, continuing to insist on Klaus Iohannis as Prime Minister. On 6 November 2009 president Traian Băsescu, associated with PDL, nominated him as candidate for Prime Minister of Romania. His chosen cabinet was however almost identical to the one of Croitoru.

However, the Democratic Liberal Party (PDL) had no parliamentary majority and the Parliament surpassed the 14-day limit for the hearing the members of Negoiță's cabinet, thus extending the political deadlock in Romania and leaving Emil Boc in office as acting Prime Minister until the presidential election.

After Băsescu's win in the election, he re-nominated Negoiță as a candidate for Prime Minister of Romania, however, he is expected to give up as a solution to the deadlock.

== Controversies and criticism ==
=== Public works contracts ===
Controversies arose during his terms as mayor of Bucharest 3rd sector because many public works contracts were won by companies owned by his friends, relatives or members of his party, the PDL.

The waste collection, car towing, and landscaping services are provided by Rosal, a company owned by PDL politician Silviu Prigoană, who also is associated in another company with Negoiță's wife.

ACM 93, a company which won road building and maintenance contracts of over 200 million lei (€50 million), is owned by Ionel Pirpiliu, the brother of Ștefan Pirpiliu, a PD-L politician and friend of Negoiță. The way many of the contracts were awarded to this company has been criticised by Evenimentul Zilei, because there were no competitive bids, being simple additional documents to older contracts.

In one case, companies owned by Prigoană won contracts for providing Platanus trees at a price of 30 lei per tree, but, through an additional document, the price was changed to 1,500–2,400 lei, more than 50 times higher than the initial price, whereas the common retail prices on the market are currently around 100-300 lei.

=== Criticism of his initiatives ===
Criticism came from Jurnalul Național, over the area of greenery which was removed for the creation of parking lots or buildings.

Another initiative for which Negoiță was criticised by Gândul was spending large amounts of money for overpriced fixtures, such as spending €4 million for 'coloured public fountains', while at the same time, the town hall borrowed €70 million.

== Electoral history ==
=== Mayor of Sector 3 ===
Election	Affiliation	First round			Second round		
Election	Affiliation	Votes	Percentage	Position	Votes	Percentage	Position
2004	DA	70,216	47.19%	1st	78,909	66.01%	1st
2008	PDL	90,788	79.05%	1st	–		
2012	PDL	48,602	29.26%	2nd			

=== Mayor of Sector 1 ===
Election	Affiliation	Main round		
Election	Affiliation	Votes	Percentage	Position
2024	PUSL	TBD	TBD	TBD
