= Ministry of Environment (Romania) =

Government ministry of Romania

Ministry of Environment, Water and Forests
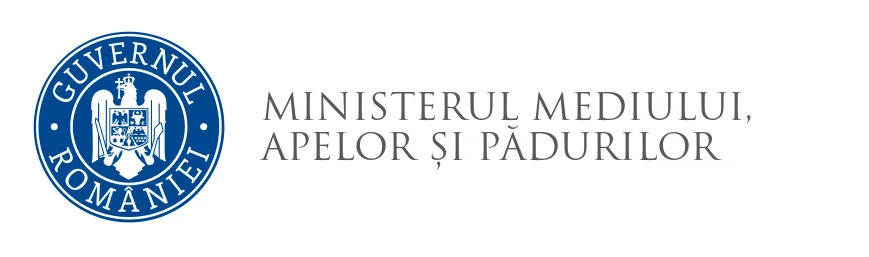
- Coat of arms of the Romanian Ministry of Environment, Water and Forests

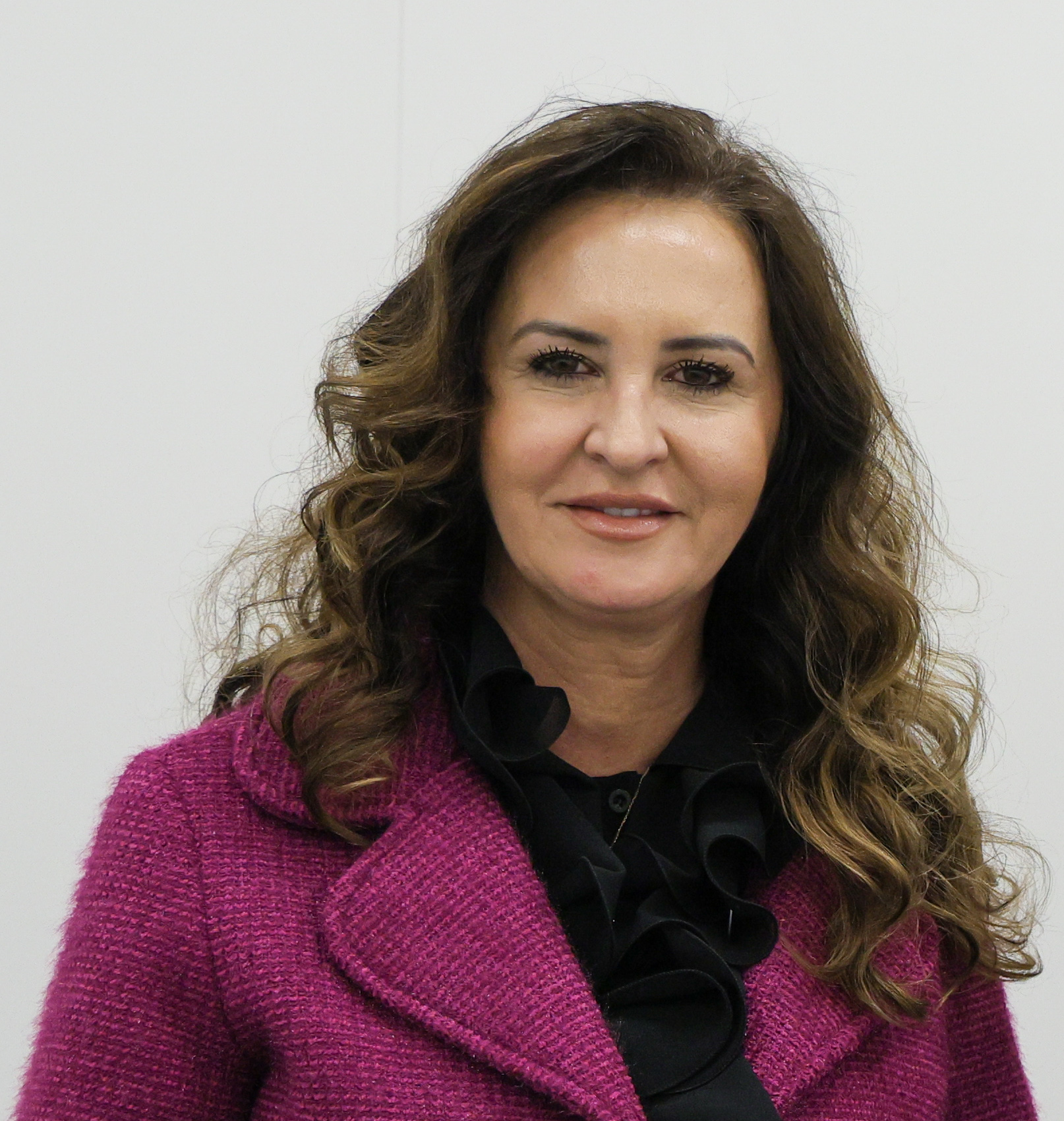
- Incumbent; Natalia-Elena Intotero since 20 October 2026
- Formation: October 1991
- First holder: Marcian Bleahu
- Website: www.mmdd.ro

The Ministry of Environment, Water and Forests (Romanian: Ministerul Mediului, Apelor și Pădurilor) is one of the ministries of the Government of Romania. It was created in 1991. The institution was known as the Ministry of Environment and Waters Management (Romanian: Ministerul Mediului și Gospodăririi Apelor) before April 2007; and then the Ministry of Environment and Forests.

== Ministers ==
Title	Officeholder	Party	Cabinet	Term start	Term end
Minister of the Environment	Marcian Bleahu	PE	Stolojan I	October 1991	November 1992
Minister of Water, Forests and Environmental Protection	Aurel Constantin Ilie	FSN	Văcăroiu I	November 1992	December 1996
Minister of Water, Forests and the Environment	Ioan Oltean	PD	Ciorbea I	December 1996	December 1997
Minister of Water, Forests and the Environment	Sorin Frunzăverde	PD	Ciorbea I	December 1997	February 1998
Minister of Water, Forests and the Environment	Romică Tomescu	PD	Ciorbea I	February 1998	April 1998
Minister of Water, Forests and Environmental Protection	Romică Tomescu	PD	Vasile I	April 1998	16 December 1999
Minister of Water, Forests and Environmental Protection	Romică Tomescu	PD	Isărescu I	16 December 1999	28 December 2000
Minister of Water and Environmental Protection	Aurel Constantin Ilie	PSD	Năstase I	28 December 2000	January 2002
Minister of Water and Environmental Protection	Petru Lificiu	PSD	Năstase I	January 2003	June 2003
Minister of Agriculture, Forests, Waters and the Environment	Ilie Sârbu	PSD	Năstase I	June 2003	March 2004
Ministry abolished			Năstase I	March 2004	December 2004
Minister of the Environment and Waters Management	Sulfina Barbu	PD	Tăriceanu I	December 2004	April 2007
Minister of the Environment and Sustainable Development	Attila Korodi	UDMR	Tăriceanu II	April 2007	December 2008
Minister of the Environment and Sustainable Development	Nicolae Nemirschi	PSD	Boc I (nick. I and II)	December 2008	1 October 2009
Minister of the Environment and Sustainable Development	Elena Udrea ad interim	PD-L	Boc I (nick. I and II)	1 October 2009	23 December 2009
Minister of Environment and Forests	László Borbély	UDMR	Boc II (nick. IV - VI)	23 December 2009	9 February 2012
Minister of Environment and Forests	László Borbély	UDMR	Ungureanu I	9 February 2012	5 April 2012
Minister of Environment and Forests	Mihai Răzvan Ungureanu acting	Ind.	Ungureanu I	5 April 2012	10 April 2012
Minister of Environment and Forests	Attila Korodi	UDMR	Ungureanu I	10 April 2012	7 May 2012
Minister of Environment and Climate Change	Rovana Plumb	PSD	Ponta I-II	7 May 2012	5 March 2014
Minister of Environment and Climate Change	Attila Korodi	UDMR	Ponta III	5 March 2014	16 December 2014
Minister of Environment and Climate Change	Gratiela Gavrilescu	PRL	Ponta IV	16 December 2014	17 November 2015
Minister of Environment and Forests	Christiana Pasca Palmer	Independent	Cioloș	17 November 2015	4 January 2017
Vice Prime Minister, Minister of Environment and Climate Change	Daniel Costantin	ALDE(România)	Grindeanu	4 January 2017	3 April 2017
Vice Prime Minister, Minister of Environment and Climate Change	Daniel Costantin	ALDE(România)	Grindeanu	4 January 2017	3 April 2017
Minister of the Environment, Waters and Forests	Grațiela-Leocadia Gavrilescu	ALDE	Mihai TudoseMihai FiforViorica Dăncilă	27 March 2017	27 August 2019
Minister of the Environment, Waters and Forests	Costel Alexe	PNL	Ludovic Orban	4 November 2019	5 November 2020
Minister of the Environment, Waters and Forests	Mircea Fechet	PNL	Florin Cîțu	5 November 2020	23 December 2020
Minister of the Environment, Waters and Forests	Barna Tánczos	UDMR	Florin Cîțu / Ciucă	23 December 2020	15 June 2023
Minister of the Environment, Waters and Forests	Mircea Fechet	PNL	Ciolacu I / Ciolacu II	15 June 2023	23 June 2025
Minister of the Environment, Waters and Forests	Diana Buzoianu	USR	Bolojan	23 June 2025	20 October 2026
Minister of Environment, Water and Forests	Natalia-Elena Intotero	PSD	Niculescu	20 October 2026	present
