= Mihai Stănișoară =

Romanian engineer and politician

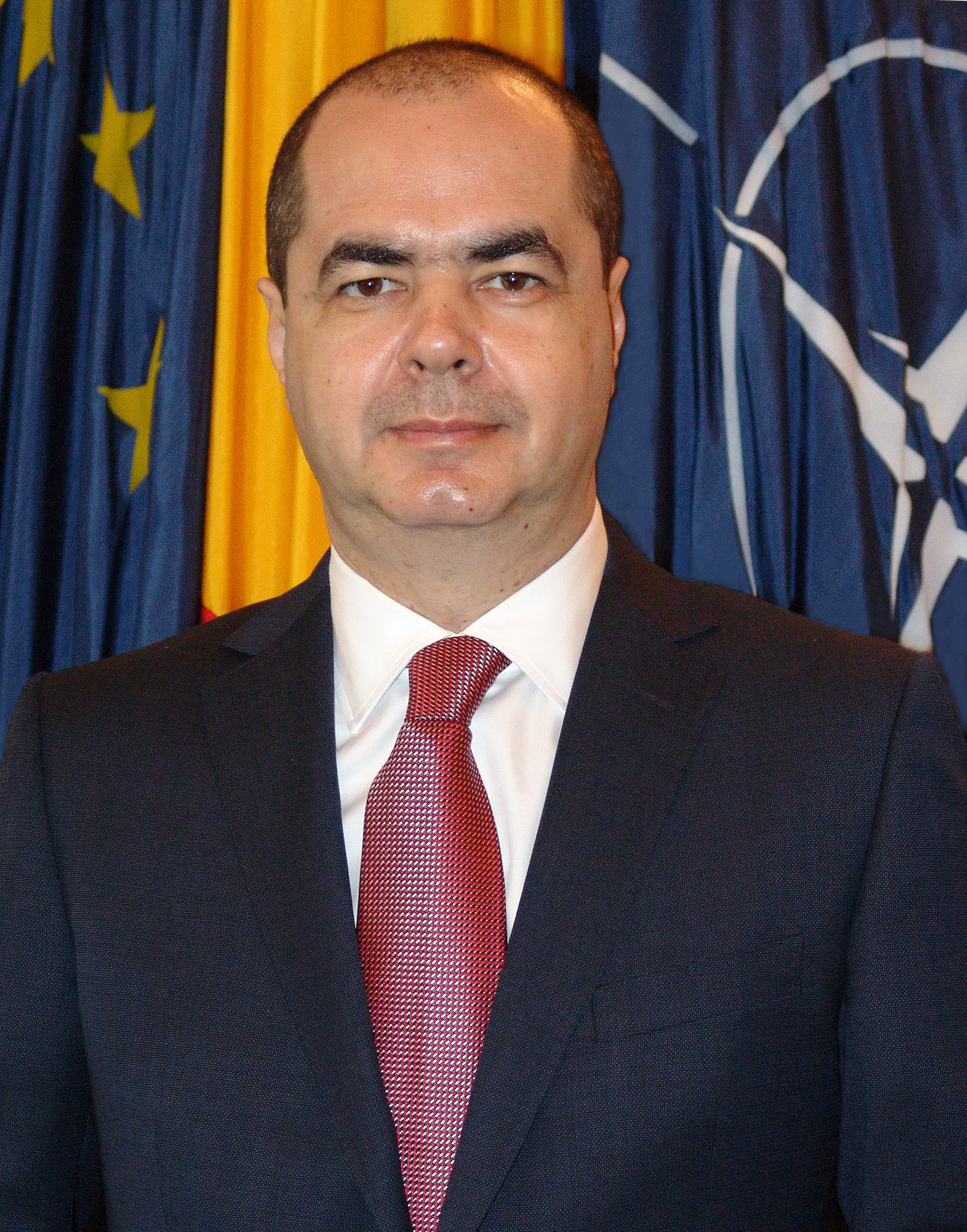
Mihai Stănișoară

Mihai Stănișoară (born June 11, 1962) is a Romanian engineer and politician. A member of the National Liberal Party (PNL) and formerly of the Democratic Liberal Party (PD-L), he was a member of the Romanian Chamber of Deputies for Mehedinți County from 2000 until March 2007, and has sat in the Romanian Senate since December 2008, representing the same county. In the Emil Boc cabinet, he was Minister of National Defence from December 2008 to December 2009.

He and his wife Codruța-Mirela have a son and a daughter.

== Biography ==
He was born in Craiova and in 1986 graduated from the Mechanics Faculty of the Polytechnic Institute of Timișoara. He holds degrees from the Carol I National Defence University (2001), the Higher College of National Security (2005) and the NATO Defence College (2006), as well as a doctorate in Technical Sciences from the Technical University of Timișoara (2003); since 2006, he has been pursuing a doctorate in Public Order and National Security from the Alexandru Ioan Cuza Police Academy. From 1986 to 1989, he worked as an engineer at the Drobeta-Turnu Severin Measurement and Control Devices Factory, and from 1988 to 1990, he was a university assistant at the Technical University of Timișoara. From 1989 to 1990, he was a design engineer at Timișoara's Centre for Appliances Research and Technological Engineering. From 1992 to 1994, he was secretary general of the Mehedinți County Chamber of Commerce and Industry, serving as its president from 1994 to 1999.

Starting in 1997, he was vice president of the permanent bureau of the Mehedinţi County Democratic Party (PD, later PD-L), and has been its president since 2000. In 2000, Stănișoară worked as secretary general at the Ministry of National Defence. That year, running on the PD ticket, he was elected to the Chamber of Deputies. He served on its foreign affairs committee and headed the Romanian Parliament's delegation to the Parliamentary Assembly of the Organization for Security and Co-operation in Europe. Additionally, he joined the PD's permanent national bureau as executive secretary in 2001. Re-elected in 2004, he became president of the defence, public order and national security committee, and was vice president of the Romanian Parliament's delegation to the NATO Parliamentary Assembly. During this term, he was accused of abuse of office and influence-peddling, after allegedly stopping an Interior Ministry investigation into the firing of the head of the Mehedinți County ambulance service. Upon leaving the Chamber in 2007, he became National Security Adviser to President Traian Băsescu, a position he held until 2008. At the 2008 election, he won a Senate seat and was named to the Boc cabinet the following month. Upon winning confirmation, he pledged adequate funding for active units, increased interoperability with allied armies, the purchase of armoured vehicles for the Land Forces and of upgraded airplanes and surface-to-air missiles, and modernisation of the Navy's frigates. In summer 2009, during Stănișoară's term, Romanian troops withdrew from the Multinational Force - Iraq. His ministerial term ended when he was not reappointed to a new cabinet under Boc at the end of 2009. At the 2012 local election, he ran for president of the Mehedinți County Council, coming in second with 41.3% of the vote. At the legislative election later that year, he placed second in his district, but won another term through the redistribution mechanism specified by the electoral law. In March 2013, at a time when he was a first vice president of the PD-L, he defected to the PNL, stating that his new party represented the future, and his old one the past.

He holds patents for two inventions in the field of fine mechanics.
