= Mircea Miclea =

Romanian psychologist and politician

Mircea Miclea (born 8 November 1963) is a Romanian professor, psychologist and politician.

Born in Cioara, Alba County, he is the professor and director of The Centre for Applied Cognitive Psychology, at Babeș-Bolyai University in Cluj-Napoca. He served as the General Chancellor of the university from 2001 to 2004. In 2001, he was named the UNESCO Chair on Higher Education Management and Governance. In 2006, he was named Head of The Presidential Commission for analysis and elaboration of policies in education and research.

Miclea was the Minister of Education and Research in the Tăriceanu I Cabinet, from December 29, 2004, to November 10, 2005.

== Affiliations ==
- 1995: International Affiliate Member of American Psychological Association
- 1996–present: European Society for Cognitive Psychology (local officer)
- 1996: Psychonomic Society Affiliate
- 1997: International Council of Psychologists
- 2000–present: Netherlands Institute of Advanced Study
- 1996–present: President of Romanian Association for Cognitive Sciences
- 2006–present: President of Romanian Psychological Association

== Honors and awards ==
- 1992: Romanian Academy of Science
- 1999: Milton Erickson Gessellschaft fur Clinische Hypnose Award
