= Ion Bazac =

Romanian physician and politician

- Born: 27 July 1968 (age 57); Bucharest, Romania
- Occupations: Physician, politician
- Years active: 2008–2009
- Employer: Ministry of Health
- Political party: Social Democratic Party
- Spouse: Camelia Bazac

Ion Bazac (born 27 July 1968) is a Romanian physician and politician. A member of the Social Democratic Party (PSD), he was the Minister of Health in the Emil Boc cabinet between 2008 and 2009.

He is married to Camelia Bazac.

== Biography ==
He was born in Bucharest and after completing secondary studies at the city's Mihai Viteazul Mathematics-Physics High School in 1986, became a physician upon graduating from the Faculty of General Medicine at the Carol Davila University of Medicine and Pharmacy in 1996, although he has never practiced medicine. He holds a Master of Business Administration from the Bucharest Academy of Economic Studies, as well as degrees in Health and Social Services Administration and Public Health Management. He has co-authored several books on health care reform. From 1997 to 1999, he was a project management specialist and procurement coordinator for a World Bank project investing in the Romanian health care system. During 2000, he was adjunct director, then director, at the General Directorate of Health and Development Policies, helping start a new World Bank programme and focusing on Romania's European Union accession as well. From December 2000, when the PSD (which he joined the following March) returned to office, until March 2002, he was a Secretary of State at the Ministry of Health and Family, responsible for European integration and international relations (including with the World Bank). He left the ministry when then-minister Daniela Bartoş, unsatisfied with his performance, demoted him to director general from secretary of state, and he refused to accept this new title. Subsequently, until July 2003, he was a Secretary of State at the Ministry of Water and Environmental Protection, with the same responsibilities as at the Health Ministry; this time, he opened negotiations with the European Commission on the Environment chapter of the acquis communautaire (which Romania had to fulfil in order to join the EU).

Leaving government when the Environment Ministry was absorbed into the Agriculture Ministry, Bazac was, from November 2003 to July 2004, chairman of the board of Global Finance & Leasing, a non-banking financial institution. From July to December 2004, he returned as Secretary of State at the Health Ministry, coordinating the health budget and the European integration department. Shortly after leaving this position, he was questioned by the National Anticorruption Prosecution Office in regard to the illegal transfer of 5 billion lei (some $150,000) to private companies during operations for procuring 2,000 air purifiers for state-owned hospitals. During 2005 and 2006, he resumed his chairmanship at Global Finance & Leasing, until it was purchased by BNP Paribas Fortis. Meanwhile, in 2005, he joined the PSD's national council, and he is also a member of its Brăila County executive bureau. In 2007 and 2008, he worked for both Inox, a stainless steel manufacturer, and as chairman of the board of Forza Rossa, Ferrari's representative in Romania. Following the 2008 election, Bazac was named Health Minister.

Among his priorities as minister were the maintenance and efficient allocation of a sin tax, the introduction of a computerised system to track prescriptions and of a new pricing scheme for medicines and a growth in private health insurance and hospital competition for funds. He promised significant pay raises for physicians, and in May 2009 fired 73 hospital managers for failing to meet contractual benchmarks. He also had to deal with the impact of the 2009 flu pandemic. Together with his PSD colleagues, Bazac resigned from the cabinet on October 1, 2009, in protest at the dismissal of vice prime minister and Interior Minister Dan Nica.

In 2002, he was made a knight of the National Order for Merit. He is the owner of Forza Rossa Racing, a motor racing team.
