= Ministry of European Integration (Romania) =

Former government ministry of Romania

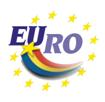
The logo of the Romanian Ministry of European Integration

The Ministry of European Integration of Romania (Romanian: Ministerul Integrării Europene) was a Romanian government ministry existing between 2000 and 2007. In 2007, shortly after Romania's accession to the EU, it was renamed the Ministry of Regional Development.

The Minister of European Integration between 2005 and 2007 was Anca Daniela Boagiu, member of the Democratic Party (PD). Another minister was Vasile Blaga, from the Democratic Liberal Party (PDL).
