= László Borbély =

Romanian economist and politician

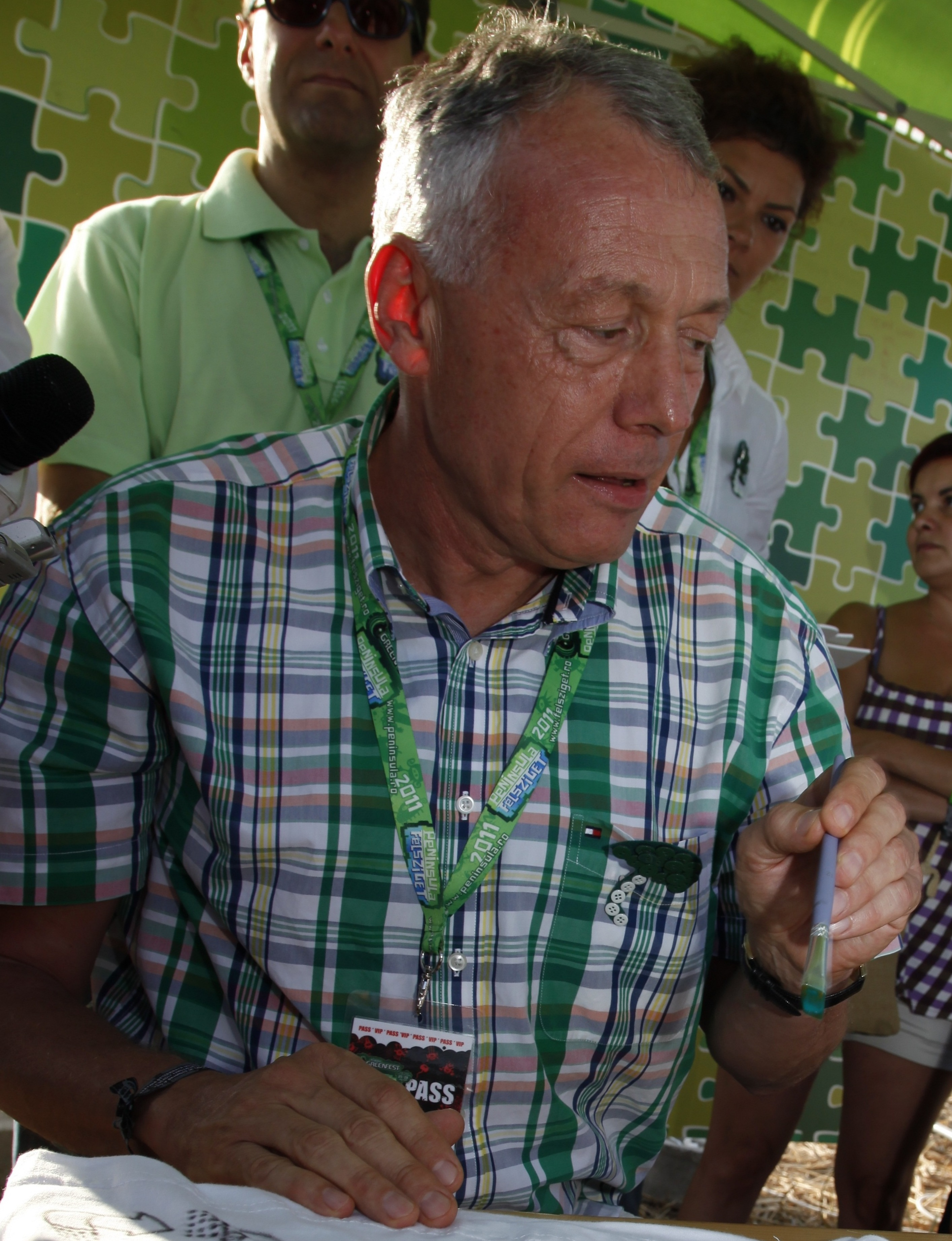
Borbély at Tuborg Green Fest Peninsula festival in 2008

László Borbély (born March 26, 1954) is a Romanian economist and politician. A member of the Democratic Union of Hungarians in Romania (UDMR), he has been a member of the Romanian Chamber of Deputies for Mureș County since 2000, having previously served there from 1990 to 1996. Since December 2009 he has been the Minister of the Environment in the Boc cabinet, previously serving in the Călin Popescu-Tăriceanu cabinet as Minister-Delegate of Transportation from 2004 to 2007, and Minister of Regional Development, Public Works and Housing from 2007 to 2008.

He and his wife Melinda, whom he married in 1980, have a daughter, Eszter, born in 1982.

== Biography ==
He was born to ethnic Hungarian parents in Târgu Mureș and completed secondary studies at the city's Bolyai Farkas High School. He then studied Economics at the University of Timișoara, graduating in 1977. While there, he was also a theatre actor, an activity he continued in Târgu Mureș until 1990, and is an avid tennis player. Following postgraduate studies at the Bucharest Academy of Economic Studies, which he finished in 1985, he attended a postgraduate seminar at the University of Salzburg in 1991, and (as of 2008) is pursuing a doctorate at Babeș-Bolyai University in Cluj-Napoca. Borbély worked as an economist in Reghin from 1977 to 1979, while continuing to live in his native city. That year, he was hired as an economist in Târgu Mureș; in 1984, he became the head of a commercial bureau there. He retained that position until 1988, when he resumed working as an economist, also in Târgu Mureș.

Following the 1989 Revolution, Borbély was initially part of the National Salvation Front but soon joined the newly created UDMR and represented it in the Chamber starting in 1990. In 1996, after the Romanian Democratic Convention (supported by the UDMR) came to power, Borbély became Secretary of State in the Ministry of Public Works and Land Management, serving until 2000. He returned to Parliament that year, and in 2004 was again named to the cabinet, this time as Minister-Delegate of Transportation. Following a reshuffle in 2007, he became Regional Development Minister, holding that position until his party entered opposition after the 2008 election. In June 2008, Borbély ran for mayor of Târgu Mureș, but was defeated by incumbent Dorin Florea of the Democratic Liberal Party (PDL) on a 52.5-44.8 margin.

Within the UDMR, Borbély has served as President of the Mureș County Chapter (1990–1994), Executive Vice President (1998–2008) and President of the Mureș County Territorial Council (2000–2005). From 1992 to 1996 and again from 2000 to 2004, he belonged to the Chamber of Deputies' Permanent Bureau. Since 1991, he has been president of the Dr. Bernády György Cultural Foundation in Târgu Mureș, and has also taught at Sapientia University's campus in that city.
