= Lucian Croitoru =

Romanian economist

Lucian Croitoru (born February 13, 1957) is a Romanian economist. On October 15, 2009, following the defeat of Emil Boc's government through a motion of no confidence, President Traian Băsescu nominated Croitoru to be Prime Minister of Romania. The nomination was opposed by a majority of Parliament, which adopted a declaration asking for his withdrawal, and vowing support for the candidature of Klaus Iohannis. Croitoru assembled a proposed cabinet, but this was voted down by Parliament on November 4.

== Biography ==
=== Academic and government career ===
Croitoru was born in Otopeni, Ilfov County. Between 1979 and 1982, he studied at the Faculty of Planning and Economic Cybernetics of the Bucharest Academy of Economic Studies (ASE). He holds a 1995 doctorate from the same university, and has had additional studies in the United States, the United Kingdom and Austria. From 1984 to 1998, Croitoru was a researcher at the Institute of Industrial Economy. He taught international macroeconomics at ASE's Faculty of International Economic Relations from 1998 to 2003.

Following graduation in 1982, Croitoru worked as an economist at the Bucharest Well and Water Works for two years. His first stint in public service came between 1991 and 1995, when he worked as an expert at the Romanian Government's Department for Economic Reform. From 1995 to 1996, he was a consultant at Bucharest Investment Group; then, until 1997, he was a partner in a research project within the framework of the 1995 Phare programme of the European Union. He was also a research partner in the 1998 Phare framework project, from January 2001 to May 2002. These focused on public finance problems in transition countries of Central and Eastern Europe.

Meanwhile, from January to September 1998, he was chief adviser to Finance Minister Daniel Dăianu. Starting that October, and until September 2003, he was adviser to the governor of the National Bank of Romania (BNR), Mugur Isărescu. In 2000, he was personal adviser to Isărescu while the latter was Prime Minister. In 2002, Croitoru became a consultant for USAID and IRIS, as well as for Phare. From September 2003 to July 2007, he was chief adviser of the International Monetary Fund's executive directorate for twelve primarily post-Communist countries. An expert in planning and implementing monetary, fiscal and business restructuring policy, in September 2007, he became Isărescu's adviser on monetary policy.

Croitoru was for a time engaged to be married to Isărescu's daughter Lăcrămioara, and has one child.

=== Prime Ministerial nomination ===
In October 2009, Croitoru, supported by the Democratic Liberal Party (PD-L), was passed over by Parliament in favour of Bogdan Olteanu, a leading member of the National Liberal Party (PNL) and a lawyer by profession, for the position of National Bank vice-governor. This provoked harsh accusations from the economic establishment that Parliament was politicizing the BNR. According to Evenimentul Zilei newspaper, Olteanu was chosen after closed-door negotiations between the PNL and the Social Democrats (or PSD, who had just quit a government coalition with the Democratic Liberals), in exchange for future PNL support of PSD appointees.

Just over a week later, President Traian Băsescu, citing the need for an individual well-versed in economic policy to steer Romania through the ongoing crisis, nominated the politically independent Croitoru as Prime Minister in place of Emil Boc, whose cabinet fell after losing a motion of no confidence two days earlier. The nomination was backed by the Democratic Liberal Party, which is supporting Băsescu in the upcoming presidential election, but drew criticism from the leaders of the Social Democratic Party (Mircea Geoană) and the National Liberal Party (Crin Antonescu), both of whom are challenging Băsescu in the race, backed non-economist Sibiu Mayor Klaus Iohannis for the position, and vowed to challenge Croitoru's nomination at the Constitutional Court or derail it in Parliament. In a meeting with Croitoru on October 20, the PNL and PSD, as well as the Democratic Alliance of Hungarians in Romania (UDMR) and the other ethnic minorities parties, told Croitoru they would not vote for a cabinet headed by him, and asked him to refuse the nomination as Prime Minister.

Nevertheless, three days later, Croitoru announced his proposed cabinet, which included 14 ministers, down from 18 in the Emil Boc Cabinet. The list included seven holdovers and seven new members, apart from Croitoru; eight were PD-L members and six independents, including one supported politically by the PD-L. The Youth and Sport, Small and Medium Enterprises, Tourism, Communications, and Regional Development Ministries were all slated to be folded into others, and the Relations with Parliament portfolio and post of Deputy Prime Minister were also eliminated in the proposal. All but two of the would-be ministers received negative recommendations from the parliamentary committees before which they appeared, and on November 4, with opposition by the PNL, PSD and UDMR holding steady, the proposed cabinet was voted down on a tally of 189 in favour and 250 against. Following the vote, Croitoru announced that his mission was over, having chosen the best cabinet he could, and would remain as an adviser at the National Bank of Romania, while an "irritated" Băsescu stated he would not name Iohannis, and would not give "moguls and oligarchs" such as Sorin Ovidiu Vântu and Dan Voiculescu the "satisfaction...of a government desired by them".

== Publications and awards ==
Croitoru has written several books and over 150 articles on economics. In 1995, he received the PS Aurelian Prize from the Romanian Academy, and in 2000 became a Commander of the Order of the Star of Romania.
