= Anca Boagiu =

Romanian engineer and politician

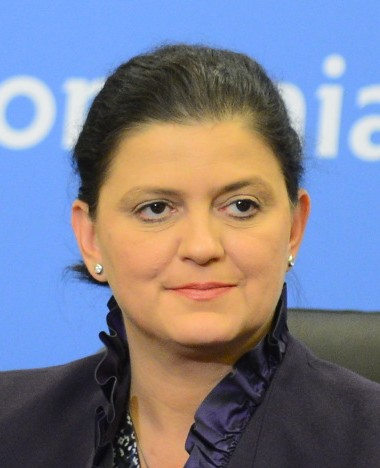
Boagiu in 2012

Anca-Daniela Boagiu (Romanian pronunciation: [ˈaŋka ˈbo̯ad͡ʒju]; born November 30, 1968) is a Romanian engineer and politician. A member of the Democratic Liberal Party (PDL), she was a member of the Romanian Chamber of Deputies for Bucharest from 2000 to 2008 and has sat in the Romanian Senate, also for Bucharest, since 2008. In the Mugur Isărescu cabinet, she served as Minister of Transport in 2000; in the Călin Popescu-Tăriceanu cabinet, she was Minister of European Integration from 2005 to 2007; and in the Emil Boc cabinet, she was again Transport Minister from 2010 to 2012.

== Biography ==
In 1995, she graduated from the Constructions Faculty, Hydrotechnical section of Ovidius University. From December 1994 to January 1996, Boagiu was assistant director for contracts and then director of construction on a project to repair two roads, DN38 and DN39, in Constanța County. From the following month until March 1997, she was in charge of procuring and spending outside grants at the National Roads Administration. For two years from May 1997, she headed the Phare management programme at the Transport Ministry.

From May 1999 to June 2000, she administered projects with outside financing at the Transport Ministry. Following the resignation of Traian Băsescu to become Mayor of Bucharest, she was named Transport Minister, serving from June to December 2000, when the Isărescu cabinet lost power after an election. She entered Parliament at that election, serving two terms in the Chamber, where she was on the following committees: industry and services (2000-2008); equality of opportunity between men and women (2000–2004); European integration (2000–2004); European affairs (2004–2008); and again European integration (2004–2006). She was European Integration Minister for a third term between August 2005 and April 2007, when the ministry was disbanded following the accession of Romania to the European Union.

Elected to the Senate in 2008, her committees there have been European affairs and education, science, youth and sport (2008-), and she has been vice president of the Senate since February 2010. That September, Boagiu was again named to the Transport Ministry by Boc, following a cabinet reshuffle. In February 2012, she resigned along with the rest of the cabinet amid anti-government protests.

In October 2012, she was elected one of ten vice presidents of the European People's Party (EPP). Later that year, at the parliamentary election, she placed second in her district, but won another term through the redistribution mechanism specified by the electoral law.

Boagiu is not married and has an adopted son. In 2010, she was made a chevalier of the Légion d'honneur. Within her party, she has been head of its Sector 2 chapter, vice president of the permanent national bureau (BPN), and executive secretary of the BPN's economic department.
