= Marian Sârbu =

Romanian trade unionist and politician

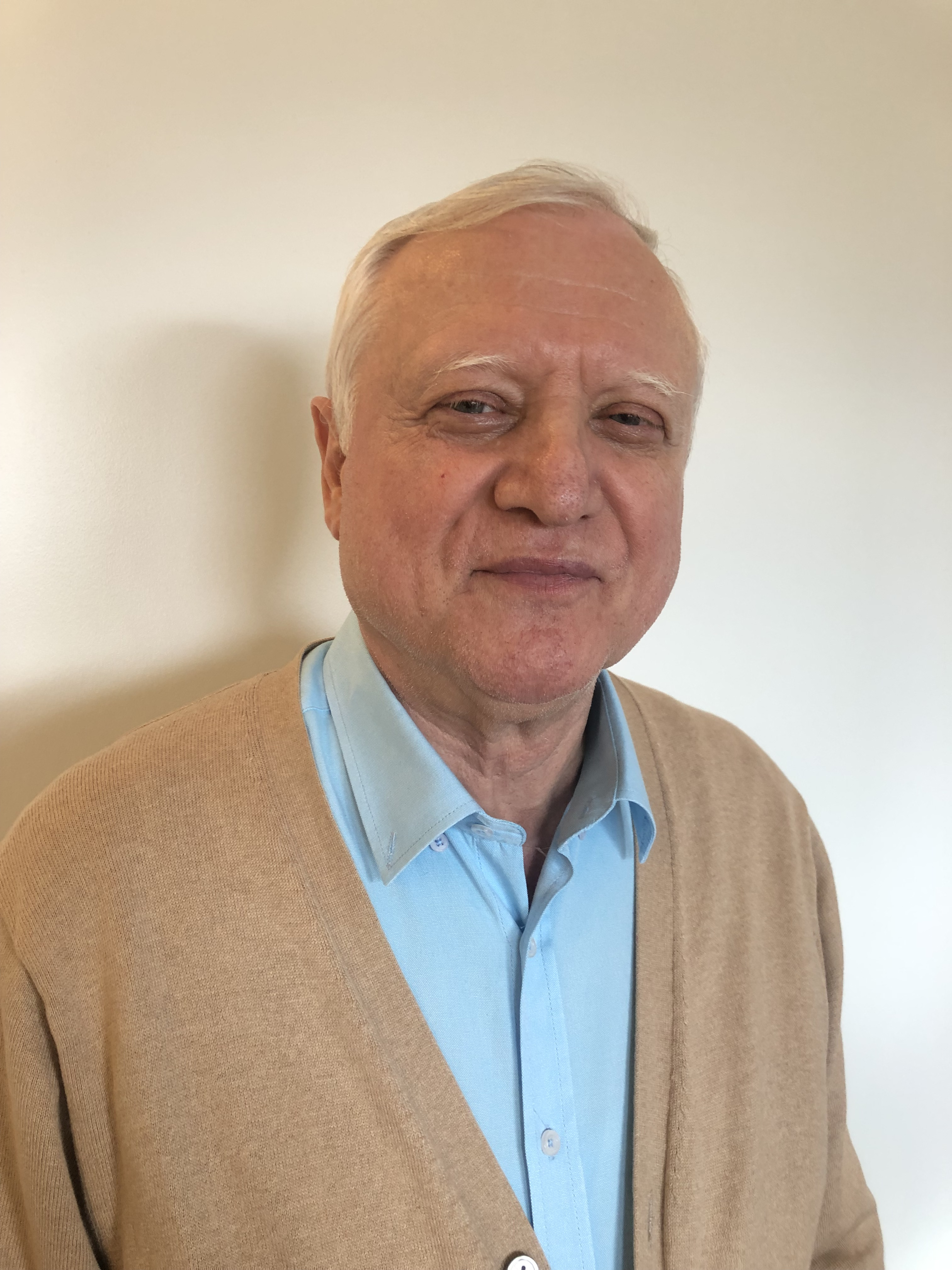
Marian Sarbu in 2023

Marian Sârbu (Romanian pronunciation: [mariˈan ˈsɨrbu]; born 12 January 1958) is a Romanian trade unionist and politician. A member of the National Union for the Progress of Romania (UNPR) and formerly of the Social Democratic Party (PSD), he has been a member of the Romanian Chamber of Deputies for Călărași County (1996–2008) and Vaslui County (since 2008). In the Adrian Năstase cabinet, he was Minister of Labour from 2000 to 2003 Minister-Delegate for Relations with Social Partners from 2003 to 2004. In the Emil Boc cabinet, he once again held the Labour portfolio from 2008 to 2009.

He is married and has one child.

== Biography ==
He was born in Budești, Călărași County, receiving a law degree in 1990 and a doctorate in Management in 2006. From 1990 to 1994, he was president of the Federation of Free Trade Unions in the Wood Industry, also serving as a member of the executive bureau of the International Federation of Building and Wood Workers from 1993 to 1994. In 1990 he also joined the National Confederation of Free Trade Unions of Romania; after this merged with the union Frăţia in 1993 to form the National Confederation of Free Trade Unions of Romania - Brotherhood (CNSLR-Frăţia), he served as the latter organisation's vice president until leaving in 1994.

In 1994, Sârbu, by then a member of the Party of Social Democracy in Romania (PDSR, which became the PSD in 2001), joined its executive bureau, to which he belonged until 1996 and from 2000 to 2004. Also until 1996, he was a secretary of state at the Ministry of Labour and Social Protection. At the 1996 election, he entered the Chamber of Deputies; while his party was in opposition for the next four years, he headed its department of political science. Re-elected in 2000, he was Minister of Labour and Social Solidarity until June 2003 and Minister-Delegate for Relations with Social Partners from then until July 2004. He was removed from the cabinet so he could join the party's coordinating bureau, on which he continued to sit for several years. As minister, Sârbu was criticised for the close links he maintained to the trade unions, for instance being one of the architects of a "non-aggression pact" between the PSD and CNSLR-Frăţia. He was elected again in 2004. From that year until 2006, he headed the party's social policy department, and from 2006 to 2008 was a vice president of the PSD. He won yet another term in 2008, having been sent to run in Vaslui County after a party colleague withdrew from the race. Throughout his time in the Chamber, he has served on its Committee for Labour and Social Protection. He resumed ministerial office in December 2008, his first act being to change the ministry's name from "Labour, Family and Equal Opportunity" to "Labour, Family and Social Protection", reflecting his priority of raising pensions, as well as reducing grey market activity from 50% to 25%, eliminating charges on employers for the first year a new employee works, and increasing professional development for the unemployed.

In the Boc cabinet, Sârbu had to deal with the effects of the 2008 financial crisis, warning in March 2009 that unemployment could reach 800,000 by year's end and promising the authorities would be able to pay unemployment benefits and would give special attention to pensioners and low-income workers, in spite of a budget deficit. He supported a proposed law capping state salaries at 9,000 lei per month, 15 times higher than the minimum salary, and stated that the minimum pension would rise to 350 lei by October 2009. Speaking to a public employees' union, he urged that strikes and protests would bring nothing to employees, instead asking for concessions. Together with his PSD colleagues, Sârbu resigned from the cabinet on 1 October 2009, in protest at the dismissal of vice prime minister and Interior Minister Dan Nica.

In February 2010, Sârbu resigned from the PSD, citing disagreements in strategy and on social policy. Joining Gabriel Oprea's group of independents in Parliament, in May he was elected president of the UNPR, which Oprea had recently founded.
