= Adriean Videanu =

Romanian politician and businessman

Adriean Marian Videanu
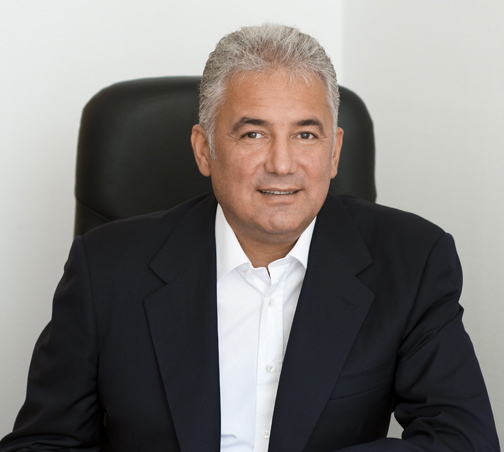

Mayor of Bucharest
- In office 20 December 2004 – 19 June 2008
- Preceded by: Traian Băsescu
- Succeeded by: Sorin Oprescu

Personal details
- Born: 1 June 1962 (age 64) Crevenicu, Teleorman County, Romania
- Party: Democratic Liberal Party
- Spouse: Mioara Videanu
- Children: 2

Adriean Marian Videanu (Romanian pronunciation: [adriˈe̯an viˈde̯anu]; born 1 June 1962) is a businessman and former mayor of Bucharest, Romania. He is also a vice president of the Democratic Liberal Party of Romania, which was led by Emil Boc and the Minister of Economy in the Boc Cabinet, since 22 December 2008.

A businessman in the marble and granite industry, Videanu was elected mayor in early April 2005, gathering 53.01% of the Bucharest electorate's vote, but the turnout was the lowest since 1989, with only 24.83% of the voters turning up.

Starting with 2008 Videanu is under corruption investigation regarding a business with raw materials for constructions (i.e. curbstones). His own companies were involved in the scandalous affair of the "curbstonization" of the Romanian capital city, Bucharest. Many streets from Romanian capital were paved with new curbstones imported from China during the period of 2006–2008. The traffic was severely disturbed, dissatisfying Bucharest inhabitants. According to some preliminary data Videanu's companies obtained illegally 4 million euros from state funds.

On 29 January 2015 he was arrested for new corruption allegations.

He and his wife Mioriţa have two children, Andrei-Valentin and Diana-Alexandra.

== Family origins and studies ==
Adriean Videanu comes from a family of wealthy farmers from the area of Videle, Teleorman. He has two brothers: Marian, born in 1958, international transports driver and Fănel, born in 1968, graduate from AES and PhD in economics.

In 1981, Adriean Videanu graduated from the High School of Mathematics - Physics no. 4 from Măgurele, near Bucharest. In the same year, he was admitted to the Faculty of Transport within the Bucharest Polytechnic, Department of Road Vehicles (AR), which he graduated in 1987. He performed a military service in a tank unit in Lipova (Arad County).

During the high school and college, he practiced volleyball for professionals (division B) and football for the Petrolul Videle team (division C) where he played 3 seasons.

== Private life ==
Adriean Videanu has been married since 1987 to Mioara Videanu, born on August 12, 1963, in the commune of Grosu, Teleorman and graduated from the Academy of Economic Studies (AES) in Bucharest, with whom he was a childhood friend. Adriean and Mioara Videanu have two children: Andrei Valentin, born in 1990 and Diana Alexandra, born in 1992. Andrei Videanu was admitted in 2009 to George Washington University (GWU) in the US, where he studies economics. Diana Videanu was accepted in 2012 at the University College of London (UCL) in the United Kingdom, Department of Science & Innovation. The Videanu couple have lived in Bucharest since 1987.

== Professional Activity before 1990 ==
In 1987, after graduating from college, Adriean Videanu obtained an assignment as an engineer within the I.T.A.U. (Light Car Transport Company), a logistics unit within the structure of the General Petroleum Special Construction Constructions Trust (T.A.G.C.S.P.) Ploiești, where he worked by 1990. During these three years he travelled from Bucharest to the workplace. At that time under the Ministry of Petrochemical Industry, the T.A.G.C.S.P. was the most important Romanian construction and logistics company with specialized activities in the field of energy, especially oil and gas. Adriean Videanu became the head of the Transport department, then, the head of the local section of the Equipment and Transport Station (S.U.T.) within the T.A.G.C.S.P and was in this position at the time of the events of December 1989.

== Political Activity ==
=== Political Start ===
In the spring of 1990, the National Salvation Front (NSF) has been prepared for parliamentary elections and looked for the young people with a university background and local notoriety. Cazimir Ionescu, the vice-president of NSF and of the Provisional Council of National Union (PCNU), responsible for Teleorman county, has address the related request to Adriean Videanu, known and appreciated locally especially for his football activity. At the age of 27, Adriean Videanu agreed to enter politics and was running for the first time as an MP on the NSF lists.

=== The founder member of the Democratic Party (DP) ===
During 1991, there were divergences within NSF between the wing that supports the acceleration of economic reforms, grouped around Prime Minister Petre Roman, and the one that militates for the extension of the state sector's presence in the economy, whose unofficial leader was President Ion Iliescu. Adriean Videanu was close to the first group and participated in March 1992 in the National Convention that enshrines the split between the two parties, following the fall of the Romanian government.

At the NSF Extraordinary National Convention of May 1993, the change of name of the NSF party to the Democratic Party (PD)was approved, Adriean Videanu was appointed the president of the youth organization and the party spokesman, positions he holds by 1996.

In 1996, he rose to the second echelon of the party, as secretary of the Executive Bureau, a body that became in 1997 NPB (National Political Bureau). During the governing of the CDR alliance where the Democratic Party was a part, Adriean Videanu was responsible for the party's image problems and relations with the press.

At the National Convention of the DP of February 2000, the same leadership was maintained around Petre Roman, categorized as a "club of barons", strongly used in polls due to his participation in the government. Adriean Videanu was reconfirmed as the executive secretary of NPB.

In July 2000, after Traian Băsescu's victory at the local elections in Bucharest, he became the coordinator of the DP Bucharest organization, which remained without a leader after the resignation of Nicolae Staiculescu. At the Extraordinary National Convention of the DP in May 2001, Petre Roman was replaced by Traian Băsescu.

In the new NPB elected in June 2001, Adriean Videanu was elected as a vice president in the first round, responsible for the party's image. From this moment, he became one of the most important leaders of the DP, representative of the new generation that came to power with Traian Băsescu.

In June 2005, after his name was circulated in the press for the DP leadership, the position finally belonged to Emil Boc, and Adriean Videanu became the executive president, a position he held by 2007, when the party merged with the Liberal Democratic Party led by Theodor Stolojan and the DP-L was created. Following this change, Adriean Videanu was elected the first vice-president of DP-L together with Theodor Stolojan, a position he held by May 2011, when he decided not to run and retired from the party leadership.

=== Coordinating the governance program of the DA alliance and promoting the single quota ===
During the campaign of the summer and autumn of 2004, Adriean Videanu was the coordinator of the governing program of the DA alliance from the DP. He was responsible for promoting it within the alliance and in the public space. The best-known measure of this program is the single tax rate of 16%.

In the fall of 2004, Adriean Videanu's name was circulated in the press and by some alliance leaders as the main option for the post of prime minister. In the formula initially negotiated, in case of victory, PNL was to propose the president, and DP the prime minister.

=== The MP of Teleorman in 5 legislatures ===
At the elections of May 20, 1990, Adriean Videanu was elected for the first time as the MP of Teleorman, from NSF.

At the elections of September 27, 1992, NFS for this time was formed a group around Petre Roman, obtained about 10% of the votes and entered the opposition. Adriean Videanu has won his second term as an MP for Teleorman. He became a member of the Committee on Budget, Finance and Banking of the Chamber of Deputies, where he collaborated with specialists such as Florin Georgescu or Florian Bercea, specializing in the field of macroeconomic and budgetary strategy.

At the Parliamentary elections of November 1996, Adriean Videanu was re-elected, this time by the Social-Democratic Union, an alliance created in 1995 around the DP. He worked in the finance committee of the Chamber of MPs. In March 2000, he was appointed as a secretary of the SRI control commission in the Chamber of Deputies of the DP.

At the parliamentary elections of November 2000, Adriean Videanu obtained the 4th consecutive term as deputy of Teleorman on the DP lists. He was elected as the vice-president of the finance budget commission of the Chamber of Deputies together with Călin Popescu-Tăriceanu from PNL, the president being the PSD deputy, Florin Georgescu.

As the vice-president of this commission, Adriean Videanu supported the tax relaxation and the increase of the added value in the export of Romanian products as well as the identification and encouragement of those sectors where Romania has real advantages.

In May 2003, he resigned from the Parliament, being according to the press the first MP who took this decision as a result of the adoption of the Law of incompatibility between the elective functions and those of director of companies. He was replaced by his deputy, Alexandru Mocanu. Re-elected deputy of Teleorman from the DP in November 2004, Adriean Videanu resigned after 2 months in the Parliament, following the appointment as deputy prime minister in the Tariceanu government, in which he was responsible for carrying out of the economic program.

=== The feedback of Traian Băsescu ===
At the local elections of June 2000, Adriean Videanu was one of the main organizers together with Liviu Negoiță and Vasile Blaga of Traian Băsescu's victorious campaign for the General City Hall of the Capital. He worked closely on the motion "Strong Romania - Social-Democratic Romania" with which Traian Băsescu won the Convention of May 2001, becoming the president of the PD. He was one of the 5 members who supported him in front of the general assembly of the party. During this period, Adriean Videanu was considered by the press as one of the main supporters of Traian Băsescu, a prominent member of the "young guard" promoted by the new president.

In his public speeches, Adriean Videanu supported the strategy of firm opposition launched by Traian Băsescu in 2001 against the PSDR government from 2000 to 2004. He became one of the main leaders and communicators of the party, which led, according to some press sources, to a cooling of the relationship with President Traian Băsescu, starting with 2002: “Adriean Videanu started to grow in the party after the elections of 2000, with the arrival of Traian Băsescu to the DP leadership. His political evolution was in line with the strategy of the current head of state, which also led to a cooling of relations between the two. For a start, Videanu, responsible for the image and spokesman of the DP, had a deleted performance compared to his duties, because the message of force was transmitted by the party president.” Thus, in July 2002, Adriean Videanu even had an attempt to withdraw from the party leadership.

During the campaign in 2004 for the general elections, Traian Băsescu publicly appreciated his success as an industrialist and businessman, and his experience in the real economy and international markets, which was interpreted by some media as a sign that Adriean Videanu would be at the DP's proposal a prime minister in case of victory. Finally, the PNL returned to the post of prime minister, and Adriean Videanu was appointed as a deputy prime minister and the minister of state responsible for economic activities.

According to some press sources, new tensions between the two has appeared starting with 2005, determined by certain changes that Adriean Videanu wanted to make at the Capital City Hall as well as by the internal competition for the DP leadership following Traian Băsescu's departure to Cotroceni. In this sense, Adriean Videanu would have been supported for the party leadership by some of the party leaders, especially by Liviu Negoiță, Vasile Blaga and Radu Berceanu. However, Emil Boc won and Adriean Videanu obtained the newly created position of the executive president. Other points of divergence would have been the promotion of the former head of the presidential chancellery, Elena Udrea, the breaking of the DA alliance or the collaboration with the Liberal Democratic Party led by Theodor Stolojan, Adriean Videanu being among the DP leaders who planned to postpone a political action of Democrats bu 2009 elections. According to the press, these tensions would have decreased in intensity with the attempt to suspend the president from office in 2007, when the DP leaders supported Traian Băsescu referendum campaign.

== The Activity of the Public Official ==
=== The Deputy Prime Minister in the Tariceanu government, responsible for the Coordination of Economic Activities ===
In December 2004, after winning the elections by the DA and Traian Băsescu alliance, Adriean Videanu resigned from the Parliament to be appointed the Minister of State and Deputy Prime Minister responsible for the Coordination of Economic Activities in the government led by Călin Popescu-Tăriceanu. In this capacity he was appointed a chief negotiator with the IMF and the World Bank.

Adriean Videanu was considered by the press during this period as the main collaborator of Prime Minister Călin Popescu-Tăriceanu on economic policies. In his opinion, the priority was to increase the competitiveness of the Romanian economic environment in order to be able to meet the requirements of the European market, in the context of Romania's integration into the EU. "In vain we will insist on the automotive or steel industry, because we will never have a competitive advantage. This does not mean that we have to close them, but to create conditions for those who have technology and a market to come and produce in our country”. Adriean Videanu considers that one of the first industries that can be successfully developed in Romania is the agri-food industry. The resources they rely on are primarily investments and especially foreign ones.

In January 2005, Adriean Videanu proposed the generalization of the obligation to declare wealth, limited only to civil servants and public officials, in order to combat tax evasion and the accumulation of illicit assets. In his view, this would allow the tax administration to establish annually the concordance between the assets of the tax home and the declared income. However, the reform provoked controversy in political and public space and was eventually cancelled.

Shortly afterwards, Adriean Videanu decided to resign from the government to run in the local elections in Bucharest. Before resigning, however, he ended the round of negotiations and signed the new agreement between Romania and the IMF. Among the latest government decisions whose approvals are obtained are the establishment of the location for the People's Salvation Cathedral in Bucharest as well as the granting of funds for the construction of a high-capacity football stadium for the national team. This last project eventually gave birth to the Arena Națională stadium in Bucharest.

== Businessman Activity ==
=== Start ===
In 1990, following the opening of the Romanian economy to private initiative and the free market, Adriean Videanu decided together with his wife to start an entrepreneurial activity. The decision was facilitated by the fact that Miorița Videanu, an economist at a furniture factory un by 1992, then was fully involved in the administration of family affairs. In 1996, she graduated M.B.A. of the I.N.D.E., an association between the A.S.E. from Bucharest and C.N.A.M. from Paris. According to their own statements, the first business of the Videanu couple was about trading in various products, including cotton and petroleum products. In 1991, they became censors and then associate of the ROCAS company from Albeștii de Muscel, Argeș, which dealt with the extraction of ornamental stone for constructions. Two years later, Adriean Videanu was among the associates of the SECON company from Roșiorii de Vede, established based on a loan approved by the French bank BNP Paribas. The company sell the petroleum products. In 1994, Adriean Videanu entered the capital of the PECON company of the same locality, which breeding the birds and pedigree animals. In 1994, the Videanu couple decided to start their own business from the scratch.

=== Titan Mar ===
In 1994, Adriean Videanu and his wife established the company SC Titan Mar Bucharest, which deals with the processing and distribution of natural ornamental stones, including marble. The economic model on which it is based involves the purchase of raw materials from manufacturing companies - at that time still owned by the state - to be then processed in-house and sold on the market. Beside the own capital, the Videanu spouses invested in the business a loan of $350,000 US dollars, obtained from Banca București. For credit, they guaranteed both the personal apartment and those of close relatives, including the wife's mother and of her aunt.

The funds were invested almost entirely in state-of-the-art technology purchased from Italy. Since 1997, the company has been exhibiting its products every year at the international trade fair in Verona (Italy), the most important in the field, where it has its own flag.

The Videanu couple run the company together by 2004, when Adriean Videanu retired so as not to be incompatible with the public positions he hold. During this period, Adriean Videanu dealt with the company's international strategy and marketing while his wife coordinated the administrative part and production.

=== Marmosim Privatization ===
Between 1994 and 1997, Titan Mar became one of the main processors and distributors of raw materials for Marmosim Simeria, a former supplier of marble products for Casa Poporului, which at that time operated 9 of the most prestigious marble quarries in Romania, the best known being the one from Rușchița. However, Marmosim's operating technology was outdated and the quality of the raw material was not always considered at the level of export requirements.

In 1997, FPS launched the process of selling the majority stake of 60%, the rest of the capital being held by other private investors. It was an international tender, where the specifications provide for the Romanian state to keep a registered control action. This, in Adriean Videanu's opinion, benefited the Romanian candidates, discouraging some foreign investors, distrustful of the local political and economic environment. The attractiveness of these companies was due to the fact that they keep in management the quarries they normally exploit, according to the Mining Act of 1998. In order to secure and qualitatively improve its supply of raw materials, Titan Mar entered this tender, being one of the 7 participants

However, Titan Mar did not have enough funds to launch itself in this operation. After several discussions with various funds, Adriean Videanu managed to negotiate the association with 2 specialized investment funds in Romania, RAEF (Romanian American Enterprise Fund) and RIF (Romanian Investment Fund) operating on the market since the early 1990s. The companies agreeded to contribute with the necessary capital and to leave the management of the company to Adriean Videanu and his wife and agreed to retreate when it was most appropriate. In 1998, Titan Mar won the auction for Marmosim. Its investment plan was considered the best: almost $14 million for a complete refurbishment of quarry operations and doubling export capacity.

Responding to various speculations on this issue, Adriean Videanu considered that he was not advantaged by the fact that DP was in the coalition that was then in power. According to his statements, however, he had to maintain discretion to ensure the success of the operation: “... I was extremely discreet with this operation. Precisely, this discretion can be interpreted differently. Many of my colleagues did not even know that if they had known, I might not have been able to buy Marmosim.”

=== Marmosim - Titan Mar ensemble ===
In 1999, Marmosim's production was still 80% for the domestic market. Sales reach $1.2 million. The main exporting countries were Germany, Italy and Hungary. New opportunities were to emerge in the US and Hong Kong. Following a market study, exports were increasingly moving to warm and rich countries, where marble was a commonly used building material.

Marmosim - Titan Mar began to be known in the US, in the Middle East (Syria) and especially in the Persian Gulf countries, where since the 2000s participated in prestigious projects: the palaces of the sultans in Brunei and Oman, residential projects in Bahrain or the United Arab Emirates United and especially the large Palm Island residential project off the coast of Dubai a company was the exclusive supplier for Class A villas. In Europe, Marmosim retained its traditional EU markets (Germany, Italy, Belgium). The company involved in the construction of Chancellor Gerhard Schroeder's residence, the BBC headquarters in Mannheim and the villa of Michael Schumacher in Monte Carlo, among others.

In 2004, Adriean Videanu states that the cumulative annual turnover of Marmosim and Titan Mar reached approximately US$18 million. In 2007, 65% of Marmosim's production was destined for export. It is the moment when Marmosim was a successful privatization and Adriean Videanu was appreciated because he managed to modernize the company and oriented it towards export. This success, appreciated by the financial and business circles, recommended him as one of the main DP candidates for the post of prime minister at the elections of 2004.

Also in 2004, the 2 investment funds whose financial contribution over 6 years of partnership was equivalent to 64.5% of the capital of Titan Mar - Marmosim, decided to withdraw and look for a buyer. According to their assessment, the entire business worth about $15 million. Put in the situation of losing control and management of the business in case of the emergence of a new shareholder, Adriean Videanu finally managed to obtain a loan from Raiffeisen Bank in Vienna and to repurchase the shares. After this operation, Titan Mar made several capital increases that allowed to purchase from the Stock Exchange the packages from the minority shareholders. The economic crisis has also affected Marmosim-Titan Mar, especially since 2009, but export sales have withstood quite well in terms of diversification into less at-risk areas: Persian Gulf, Japan, Central Asia. In 2011, Marmosim and Titan Mar together recorded a turnover of 76.5 million RON, which represented 17.7 million Euros or about $23 million US dollars.

=== Other investments and ongoing projects ===
Titan Mar is the owner of a land of approximately 6 hectares in Bucharest, of the area September 13, on the site of the former Vulcan enterprise. According to media sources, the area could be the subject of a residential project that has not yet started.

=== Equity and management of companies ===
According to the data from the Trade Register, in September 2012, Adriean Videanu was a shareholder in the capital of Pecon SA, Secon SA, Equity Invest (brokerage) and Titan Mar. He was also the administrator of the Titan Mar company, together with his wife.

== Controversies ==
=== Personal wealth ===
Since 2002, Capital magazine considers Adriean Videanu as one of the top 100 richest people in Romania. In 2004, his wealth was estimated at US$30 million, when he was preparing to enter the Tariceanu government. The calculation was based in particular on the presumed value of the shares held by the Videanu spouses in the Titan Mar - Marmosim business.

However, the analysis of the 2 investment funds RAEF and RIF, made in 2004, when they decided to leave the Marmosim - Titan Mar business, indicates a value of only $15 million US dollars, of which almost two thirds belong to the funds.

In 2009, the same Capital magazine considers that Adriean Videanu's wealth would reach 200-220 million euros. The figure is based primarily on an estimate of the value of Titan Mar-Marmosim at the end of the economic and real estate boom period, including the land in Bucharest, the September 13 area in the Titan Mar patrimony.

However, in 2010, Adriean Videanu claims, responding to attacks from the media, that his personal wealth is not so big and that the press evaluations are too much exaggerated. Thus, the personal wealth of the Videanu spouses would not exceed 2 million euros, everything being found in his public declaration of wealth and income. The last public statement of this kind, that of Minister of Economy in December 2009, includes, among others, the shares held by the Videanu spouses in various companies, first of all Titan Mar, the real estate patrimony as well as the dividends obtained. He claims that media evaluations are exaggerated and prejudicial. Adriean Videanu declares on this occasion that he is ready to donate publicly any difference that would be found compared to his declaration of wealth.

"Unfortunately, things are not always true in everything that is said. Everyone says that Videanu has 200 million euros. Can I convince someone as long as the media said I have? If someone, and it is my public commitment, can prove that I have one RON plus to what is in the declaration of wealth, I will donate everything that can be proved to anyone in this country.” Adriean Videanu proposes that the wealth of politicians to be publicly verified both in terms of provenance and in terms of taxes and duties paid. "I do not agree with the politicians who hide behind their mother-in-law, behind their brother-in-law and currently have assets for which they cannot justify the origin of the money or the taxes and duties related to the wealth."

=== Media attacks ===
Until 2005, Adriean Videanu has a low notoriety but mostly positive. However, his arrival at the General City Hall of the Capital propels him on the first stage, in the attention of the public opinion and especially of the mass media. After the first year of his mandate, with the launch of major infrastructure projects, Adriean Videanu begins to be attacked in the written press and by the TV channels. Campaigns and attacks intensified in 2007 and 2008, as the works in the Capital increased in intensity.

"For Videanu, the" grace period "passes quickly, because, with the first works starting in 2006, the first controversies caused by the traffic blockade in the Capital has appear." "... Compared to a mayor like Traian Băsescu, Videanu's media presence is considered too modest, especially in relation to the scale of the announced projects. The Mayor-General's explanations that he does not have enough time for the media are not satisfactory."

The attacks come mainly on issues of a private nature, holidays spent abroad or the construction of a family home near Bucharest. To these is added the subject of "borders", where allegations of abuse and conflict of interest are serious and ultimately lead to the opening of a parliamentary inquiry and a civil lawsuit in court. However, this will prove Adriean Videanu right in 2011 by a final sentence.

The attacks and accusations continue during his term as Minister of Economy, making Adriean Videanu one of the most attacked politicians in the Romanian media. According to journalist Ioana Ene from ziare.com, Adriean Videanu is the object of a “populist media lynching” in 2010, due to the fact that he refused to pay “immunity” or advertising budgets to the media. Thus, the media trusts have attacked him, especially Antena 3 and Realitatea TV, would actually play into the political and private interests of their shareholders.

„...After they took away the places where he spends his holidays, presenting pictures from Mamaia as pictures from the Côte d'Azur, the valiant employees of S.O. Vantu also reached to the 1400 sq m villa which Mr. Videanu has finished near Bucharest ... Adriean Videanu is, indeed, a very rich man and he was very rich before he became mayor general of the Capital. He is a prosperous businessman who works in a field with great weight, both literally and figuratively: the exploitation and sale of marble and tiles. I don't know if you can get rich by selling pretzels, but surely marble has great potential ... What should really interest us at Adriean Videanu and all people of his financial caliber are completely different things. First of all, we should be interested in whether every penny of his wealth was made honestly, if for every penny taxes were paid to the state and if any penny of this wealth is the result of a detrimental contract for the state ... Journalists who attack him have no way to talk about the rope in the houses of their owners, including politicians, who can be attacked both in terms of interests and business with the state, and in terms of tax evasion found by ANAF. It is simpler and safer to attack populists with houses and cars that in themselves have nothing wrong.”

In a reply given to Realitatea TV in June 2010, Adriean Videanu, as Minister of Economy, publicly confirms his position not to pay for public funds.

"...This whole campaign to discrediting me does nothing but prove unequivocally that you have a problem in your relationship with me and I have always said: it is the fact that at the moment national companies no longer advertise. I tell you once again that national companies will no longer advertise to anyone...”

Adriean Videanu claims that he was personally subjected to some form of blackmail from certain media trusts and that the negative image they created is primarily due to his refusal to pay in order not to be attacked.

"In our country, it was allowed to create trusts and media bodies with a single majority, private shareholder, often with great interests in the national political and economic game, without a real counterpower to protect both public opinion and the injured. Many of these trusts are not impartial and take advantage of the audience they make through all sorts of emotional tricks, most of them through negative emotions, to practice political manipulation and blackmail. Their goal is not to inform, and the audience is not an end in itself but just a means to serve the interests of an individual or a group. It is a major problem of post-December Romania and it contributes a lot to the tensions in society. (...) Personally, I was subjected to this kind of blackmail and I refused to give it a go, considering that in the end it will be reflected objectively what you do in a certain position. I was wrong. If you pay it reflects, if not, no. And the campaigns that can be launched against you can be extremely dirty.”

=== Curb business ===
In 2007, Adriean Videanu's share of popularity was declining. The rupture of the Justice and Truth alliance in April and the opposition between PNL and PD accentuate the criticism on him. To this are added the difficulties caused by the numerous construction sites open simultaneously in the Capital, which make traffic difficult for months. Against this background, Cancan magazine published an investigation regarding the private vacation spent by Adriean Videanu on the French Riviera in the summer of 2007. In early February 2008, a few months before the local elections, "Financial Week", a magazine belonging to the media trust Intact Media Group stated that Titan Mar provided at least part of the street curbs that are placed in the Capital as part of the projects on restoration of road infrastructure. Adriean Videanu was accused of conflict of interest. The scandal took on a large scale, primarily in the media, and will last for several years, bringing Adriean Videanu the nickname "The Mayor of Curbs".

Adriean Videanu defended himself by showing that none of his companies have a contractual relationship with the City Hall and that all tender procedures have been followed by law. The general contractor working on the project being the one who selected his suppliers, he had the legal right to appeal, among others, to the company Titan Mar, one of the first suppliers of natural stone in Romania. It would have provided the curbs worth to 665,000 lei, respectively 1.62% of the total investment in this material, made by the Street Administration in the period of 2005 - 2007.

In 2008, a report of the Court of Accounts regarding the General City Hall of the Capital was published, which has revealed a series of possible irregularities, among others the price paid for a dog shelter located in Mihăilești commune. Following this report, a parliamentary inquiry commission was set up in the Senate, at the initiative of some DLP members. It was also to verify the allegations of conflict of interest. A civil lawsuit was filed against Adriean Videanu in 2008 at the Bucharest Tribunal, following a notification sent by the Court of Accounts. It also notified the DNA, which started its own investigation, while ANI verified the existence of a possible conflict of interests.

In May 2009, the Bucharest Tribunal did not hold any charges regarding a possible conflict of interest or other illegality in the "curb" business. Instead, the court retained two other issues in charge of the former mayor general: the purchase of land for dog shelter, which would not be in line with the mandate given by the CGPMB and the lack of recovery of the CAS from general counselors. According to this decision, which was not final, Adriean Videanu and 23 other officials of the Capital City Hall during this term should pay damages of approximately 5 million lei.

Adriean Videanu appealed and won the lawsuit in December 2011. The decision of the Bucharest Court of Appeal was final and irrevocable. It is also confirmed by the DNA and ANI investigations, which, based on the complained received, did not reveal any illegality committed during the term of office of Adriean Videanu as General Mayor, including in the case of "the curve" business.

=== Controversies with Victor Ponta ===
In July 2009, during the governing of the PDL-PSD coalition, Victor Ponta, then Minister for Relations with the Parliament, began to publicly attack the Minister of Economy Adriean Videanu, his government colleague, for the changes made in the management of the Gorj branch of Hidroelectrica. According to some press sources, the controversy between the two would have had as a starting point the termination in the spring of 2009 of the contract of the company Șova și Asociații, close to Victor Ponta, with the Turceni Energy Complex. This was decided by the director of the complex, Ionel Manțog, Victor Ponta's old political opponent, appointed by Adriean Videanu without the consent of PSD. After PSD left the government in October 2009 and the election of Victor Ponta as a head PSD in February 2010, he began to attack Adriean Videanu more and more often and harshly at the TV shows or public statements, calling him a "thief" and "corrupt". In August 2010, Adriean Videanu sued Victor Ponta for slander.

After the installation of the Victor Ponta government in May 2012, Adriean Videanu became his "the most vocal critic", primarily in the field of economic policy. In June 2012, he publicly presented a critical assessment done by the PDL of the first month of SLU rule.

==== The "Hidroelectrica and the smart guys" business ====
Between June and July 2012, Victor Ponta launched various accusations of fraud against Adriean Videanu regarding Hidroelectrica, stating several times that the investigation bodies were notified and that "he is convinced that they will do their duty". The most important of these accusations is related to the signing and extension of the preferential commercial contracts of Hidroelectrica (also called contracts with "smart guys"), contracts for which Adriean Videanu would be responsible, in the opinion of Victor Ponta.

However, Adriean Videanu has shown that during his time as Minister of Economy, the company did not sign any such contract. According to his statements, they were signed especially in 2003 and 2004 by the PSD government, which also included Victor Ponta, then head of the Government's Control and Anti-Fraud Corps. The contracts had the terms 2013-2014 and, in the opinion of Adriean Videanu, they were drafted in such a way that their termination would be a deterrent for the Romanian state.

Between 2009 and 2010, when Hidroelectrica was in a particularly difficult economic situation, Adriean Videanu agreed to renegotiate the energy tariffs provided in these contracts. Thus, the company would have achieved in 2010 the best result in its history, with a profit of over 100 million euros. The tariff increase was negotiated in exchange for the extension of bilateral contracts after the period 2013 - 2014. However, the tariffs would have been ultimately aligned with market values due to the creation of the 2 national energy companies. According to Adriean Videanu, the reform would have involved both a change of legal entity and a change of product, the hydro energy being transformed into combined energy, which would have allowed an automatic revision of the contracts.

In response to Victor Ponta's accusations against him, Adriean Videanu pointed out that these would be insinuations without evidence and "unqualified pressure" from the Prime Minister on justice.

Regarding the insolvency procedure launched by the Victor Ponta government at Hidroelectrica, Adriean Videanu considered that this was a national strategic company and cannot be treated as "a company that sells slippers". The insolvency decision can induce "very large negative effects, implicitly lowering the company's rating, which would reduce access to credit." He accused the Executive of trying to sell the company in pieces.

==== Financial management at the Bucharest City Hall ====
In a public speech on September 12, 2012, Prime Minister Victor Ponta again accused Adriean Videanu of "serious irregularities" in financial management during his term as Mayor General of Bucharest. Thus, "these irregularities could close the Capital" being "very high debts" for which "prosecutors should look over these documents signed by the former mayor."

In reply, Adriean Videanu claimed that Victor Ponta's attacks have a political character. The bond issue that the Capital City Hall carried out in 2005 under its mayoral mandate, obtained the best possible interest rate, it being a normal way of financing for a capital in order to carry out large projects. The sums were used to achieve objectives such as the Arena Națională or the Basarab Overpass.

==== Privatization of Oltchim ====
A new accusation was launched on September 24, within the privatization of the Oltchim plant, where Adriean Videanu and a part of the press denounced the lack of professionalism of the government led by Victor Ponta. This time, the accusations launched by Victor Ponta refer to the fact that "Minister Videanu" allegedly violated in 2009 the "legal provisions" and "national interests" by promoting in the government a loan guaranteed by the Romanian state of 500 million euros for Oltchim, despite the opposition of SDP ministers. According to Victor Ponta, Adriean Videanu would have waited for the SDP ministers to leave the government to fulfill the "fraud procedure of the Romanian state". Victor Ponta stated again that "state institutions have been informed for a long time", but could not specify whether the Prosecutor's Office has started any investigation in this regard. "The responsibility must come and Videanu and all the others who participated in the fraud must answer, as they will probably have to answer in the case of the fraud of Hidroelectica and the other big Romanian companies." At the same time, Victor Ponta accused Adriean Videanu, whom he calls "the thief of thieves", of having an agreement with Dan Diaconescu, the winner of the tender for Oltchim, to "cover the frauds committed by PD-L in Oltchim".

Adriean Videanu, in turn, vehemently rejected these accusations, denying any agreement with Dan Diaconescu and calling Victor Ponta a "national mythomaniac" and "Bulă". He publicly has shown the memorandum of 2009 in which the members of the DLP-SDP government of that time, of which Victor Ponta was a member, signed the state credit guarantee for Oltchim. The measure was in his view economically justified and was a part of the plant's relaunch plan.

At the same time, Adriean Videanu declared that Victor Ponta is guilty of closing Oltchim and threatens to file a complaint with the Prosecutor's Office for attempting to undermine the national economy due to the poor management of the plant privatization by the Government.
