= Sulfina Barbu =

Romanian politician

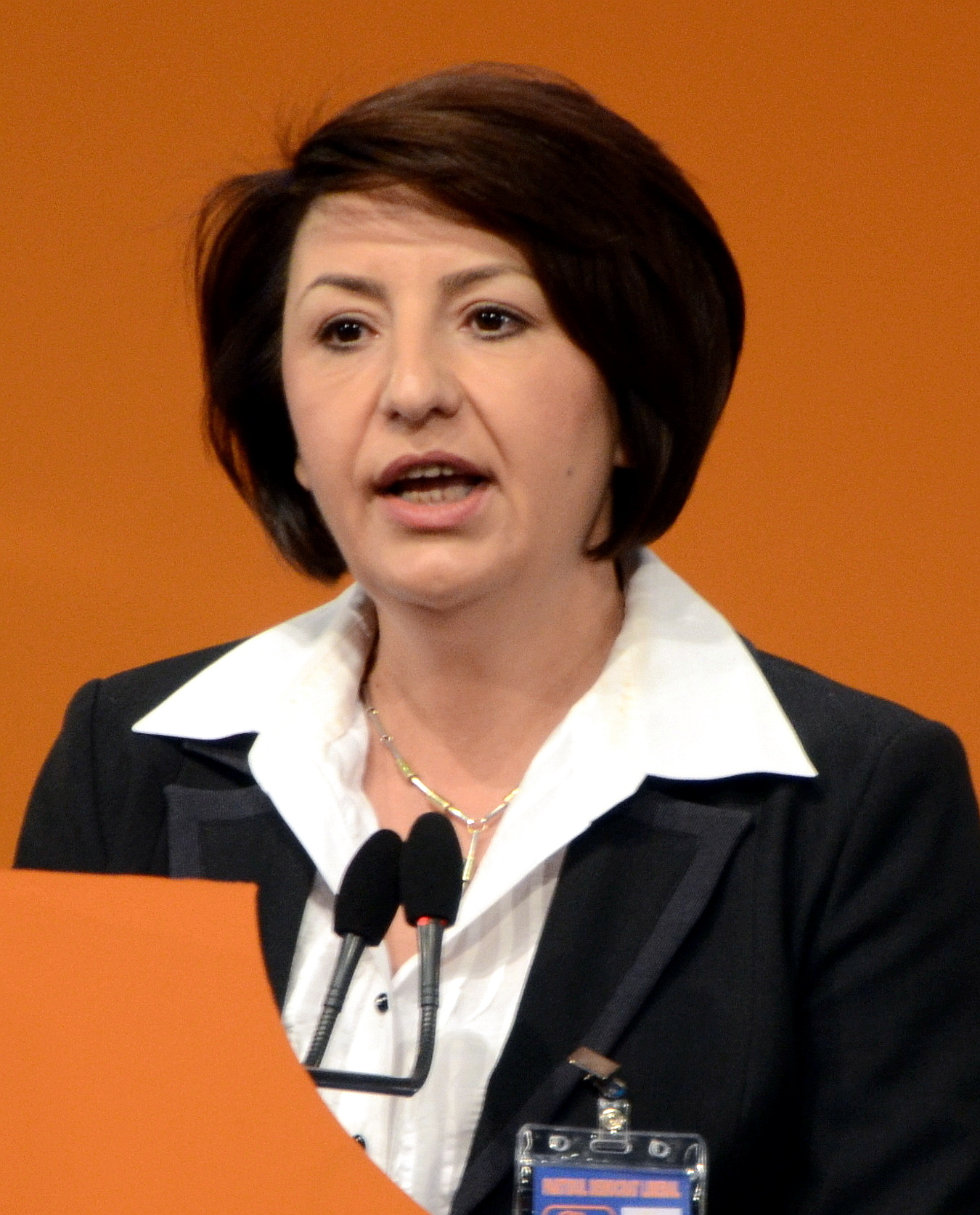
- Sulfina Barbu (March 2013)

Member of the Chamber of Deputies
- In office 2008–2012

Minister of Labour
- In office September 2011 – 9 February 2012
- President: Traian Băsescu
- Prime Minister: Emil Boc
- Preceded by: Sebastian Lăzăroiu
- Succeeded by: Claudia Boghicevici

Minister of Environment
- In office December 2004 – April 2007
- President: Traian Băsescu
- Prime Minister: Călin Popescu-Tăriceanu
- Preceded by: Ilie Sârbu
- Succeeded by: Attila Korodi

Personal details
- Born: 9 March 1967 (age 59) Romania

Sulfina Barbu (Romanian pronunciation: [sulˈfina ˈbarbu]; born 9 March 1967) is a Romanian politician and member of the Chamber of Deputies.

== Life ==
Barbu was born on 9 March 1967. In 1990 she graduated from the Faculty of Geology and Geophysics of the University of Bucharest. From 1991 to 1997 she was geophysicist engineer at Prospecțiuni, then she was the commercial director at Industrial Construct from 1997 to 2001, then from 2001 to 2004 the deputy executive general manager of the Environmental Protection and Ecocivic Education Directorate in Bucharest.

A member of the Democratic Liberal Party (PDL), she was the President of the Women Organisation of the Democratic Liberal Party and a former Minister of Environment and Water Management in the Romanian Government between December 2004 and April 2007. Upon taking office, Barbu adopted the objectives of the DA Alliance, and emphasized integrating environment policies into regional policies and strengthening environmental institutions' capacities. In 2005 she accused Aquaproject, a company where Aurel Constantin Ilie's wife is a major shareholder, of corruption by having received contracts through entrustment from Adrian Nastase to which they responded that the contracts were obtained legally. In turn, Liliana Dragan, the majority shareholder, said that Barbu was to blame for the extensive damage in Romania during the 2005 European floods. She was also heavily criticized by other outlets for her role in the floods in 2005, with allegations that she did not adequately prepare Romania. Barbu said her main concerns as minister were global warming, preventing noise and air pollution, protecting bio-regions, and allowing access to water. In 2009, she was again proposed to be Minister of Environment, but the joint committee voted against the proposal after criticism for her shares in the KVB company.

She became Minister of Labour in September 2011. She was dismissed on 9 February 2012, and then in February 2013 until 30 June 2017 was Director of the consulting company S.C. Eco Conmar Consulting S.R.L.
