= Vasile Blaga =

Romanian politician

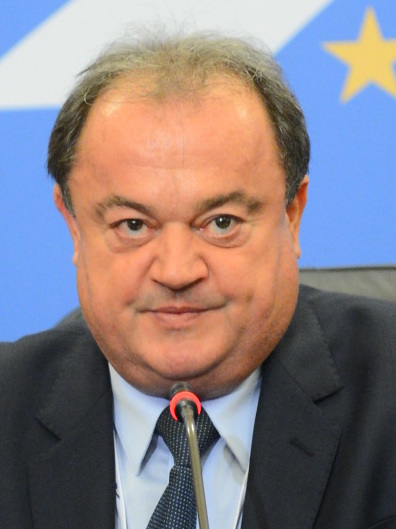
- Blaga in 2012

Member of the Senate of Romania
- Incumbent
- Assumed office 21 December 2024
- Constituency: Timiş
- In office 13 December 2004 – 19 December 2016
- Constituency: Bucharest
- In office 22 November 1996 – 10 December 2000
- Constituency: Bihor County

Member of the European Parliament from Romania
- In office 2 July 2019 – 15 July 2024

President of the Senate of Romania
- In office 29 November 2011 – 3 July 2012
- President: Traian Băsescu
- Preceded by: Mircea Geoană
- Succeeded by: Crin Antonescu

Member of the Chamber of Deputies
- In office 18 June 1990 – 14 February 1992
- Constituency: Bihor County

Minister of Internal Affairs
- In office 29 December 2004 – 4 April 2007
- Prime Minister: Călin Popescu-Tăriceanu
- Preceded by: Marian Săniuță
- Succeeded by: Cristian David
- In office 1 October 2009 – 27 September 2010
- Prime Minister: Emil Boc
- Preceded by: Dan Nica
- Succeeded by: Traian Igaș

Minister of Regional Development and Public Administration
- In office 22 December 2008 – 27 November 2009
- Prime Minister: Emil Boc
- Preceded by: Dan Motreanu
- Succeeded by: Elena Udrea

Prefect of Bihor County
- In office 1991–1993

Co-President of the National Liberal Party
- In office 18 December 2014 – 28 September 2016 Serving with Alina Gorghiu
- Preceded by: Klaus Iohannis
- Succeeded by: Alina Gorghiu

President of the Democratic Liberal Party
- In office 30 June 2012 – 17 November 2014
- Preceded by: Emil Boc
- Succeeded by: Klaus Iohannis (merged within the National Liberal Party)

Personal details
- Born: 26 July 1956 (age 70) Petrileni, Bihor, Romania
- Party: National Liberal Party (2014–present)
- Other political affiliations: National Salvation Front (1990–1993); Democratic Party (1993–2007); Democratic Liberal Party (2007–2014)
- Spouse: Margareta Violett Blaga
- Children: 2
- Education: Polytechnic University of Timișoara; Carol I National Defence University

Vasile Blaga (Note: Romanian pronunciation: [vaˈsile ˈblaɡa]) (born 26 July 1956) is a Romanian centre-right politician who is currently serving as a Senator of Romania since 2024, representing Timiș County. He previously held the same position from 1996 to 2000 (representing Bihor County) and again from 2004 to 2016 (representing Bucharest). Between 2011 and 2012, he also briefly served as President of the Senate of Romania.

Between 2019 and 2024, he took a five-year break from national politics, during which he served as a Member of the European Parliament (MEP).

His ministerial career includes two terms as Minister of Internal Affairs (2004–2007, 2009–2010) under Călin Popescu-Tăriceanu and Emil Boc, as well as serving as Minister of Regional Development and Public Administration (2008–2009).

In addition to his government roles, Blaga was President of the Democratic Liberal Party (PDL) from 2012 to 2014 and later served as Co-President of the National Liberal Party (PNL) alongside Alina Gorghiu (2014–2016) following the merger of the two parties.

Earlier in his career, he was Prefect of Bihor County (1991–1993) and a Member of the Chamber of Deputies (1990–1992).

== Political career ==
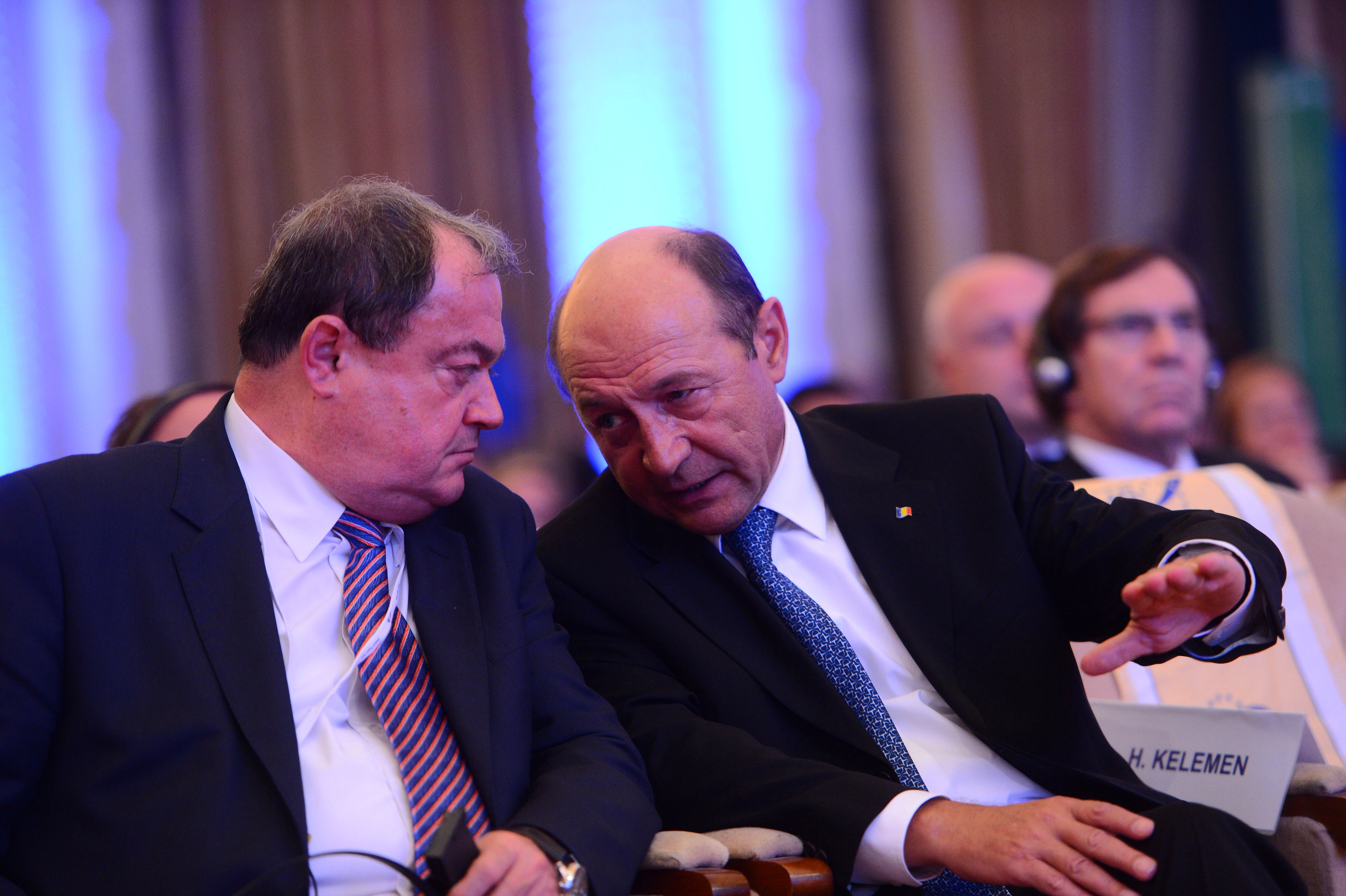
Vasile Blaga and President Traian Băsescu in October 2012

Born in Petrileni, Bihor County, Blaga started his political career after the fall of Communism in Romania in 1989. He was a Member of Parliament in the Romanian Chamber of Deputies, representing Bihor County, between 1990 and 1991, after which he became the Prefect of Bihor, serving until 1993.

Following the legislative election of 1996, he became a member of the Romanian Senate from the Democratic Party, representing Bihor County. He was reelected at the 2004 election for the Justice and Truth Alliance (DA), of which the Democratic Party (PD) was a member, representing Bucharest (where he presently resides). Blaga was appointed the Minister of Administration and Interior Affairs later in the same year.

In 2008, he was a candidate for the position of mayor of Bucharest from the Democratic Liberal Party (PDL), seeking to replace incumbent mayor Adriean Videanu, who did not want to compete for a second term.

He came second in the first round of the elections, trailing independent Sorin Oprescu. For the second round, he gained the support of Gigi Becali's New Generation Party (PNG) and of the Social Democrat mayor Bucharest's Sector 2, Neculai Onțanu, as well as the opposition of National Liberal Party (PNL) and the Social Democratic Party (PSD). Oprescu won the race on a 56-44 margin. He was the president of the Democratic Liberal Party (PDL) until its dissolution in the summer of 2014, when it merged with the National Liberal Party (PNL), of which he served as co-president, along with Alina Gorghiu, until 28 September 2016. On that date, Blaga was charged with influence peddling by the National Anticorruption Directorate and announced his resignation as party co-leader, though he maintained he is innocent.

== Electoral history ==
=== Mayor of Bucharest ===
Election	Affiliation			
Election	Affiliation	Votes	Percentage	Position
2008	PDL	242,700	41.4%	2nd

== Notes ==
Political offices
Preceded by Marian Săniuță	Minister of Internal Affairs; 2004–2007	Succeeded by Cristian David
Preceded by Dan Nica	Minister of Internal Affairs; 2009–2010	Succeeded by Traian Igaș
Preceded by Mircea Geoană	President of the Romanian Senate; 2011–2012	Succeeded by Crin Antonescu
Party political offices
Preceded by Emil Boc	President of the Democratic Liberal Party; 2012–2014	Position abolished
Preceded by Klaus Iohannis	President of the National Liberal Party; 2014–2016; Served alongside: Alina Gorghiu	Succeeded by Raluca Turcan
