= Democratic Liberal Party (Romania) =

Democratic Liberal Party Partidul Democrat-Liberal
- Abbreviation: PDL or PD-L
- President: Emil Boc (2007–2012); Vasile Blaga (2012–2014)
- Founded: 15 December 2007
- Dissolved: 17 November 2014
- Merger of: Democratic Party & Liberal Democratic Party
- Merged into: National Liberal Party (major faction)
- Succeeded by: People's Movement Party (minor faction)
- Headquarters: Aleea Modrogan, 1 Bucharest
- Membership (2014): 218,013
- Ideology: Liberal conservatism; Christian democracy; Economic liberalism; Right-wing populism
- Political position: Centre-right
- National affiliation: Right Romania Alliance (2012); Christian Liberal Alliance (2014)
- European affiliation: European People's Party
- European Parliament group: European People's Party
- International affiliation: Centrist Democrat International
- Colours: Orange Blue

Website
- pdl.org.ro (archived)

The Democratic Liberal Party (Romanian: Partidul Democrat-Liberal, PDL) was a liberal-conservative political party in Romania. The party was formed on 15 December 2007, when the Democratic Party (PD) merged with the Liberal Democratic Party (PLD). On 17 November 2014 the PDL officially merged into the National Liberal Party (PNL), ceasing to exist. The PDL was associated with Traian Băsescu, who was previously leader of the PD and President of Romania from 2004 to 2014.

== History ==
=== Background ===
The PDL traces its roots in the National Salvation Front (FSN), the governing body which, under the leadership of Ion Iliescu, seized power during the Romanian Revolution of 1989 which ended the previous 42-year-long Communist regime in Romania. Conflicts broke out between FSN leaders Ion Iliescu and Petre Roman in early 1992, and this led to the separation of the Iliescu wing under the name of Democratic National Salvation Front (FDSN), which later became the Social Democratic Party (PSD).

In 1993, the FSN was renamed Democratic Party (PD) and distanced itself from its social-democratic roots to gradually become a centre-right party, whose ideology was transmitted to the PDL.

In advance of the 2004 general election, the PD joined forces with the National Liberal Party (PNL) to create the Justice and Truth Alliance (DA), whose main purpose was to oppose the governing Social Democratic Party (PSD).

=== Foundation ===
From mid 2005, the PD's relations with the PNL also became strained. On 15 December 2007, the PD merged into the new Democratic Liberal Party (PDL) along with the Liberal Democratic Party (PLD), a splinter group from the PNL which was led by Theodor Stolojan. The PLD approved the merger in a party congress with 933 votes in favour, six abstentions, and one against.

The PDL still kept the social-democratic rose as its symbol, as a memory of PD's left-wing past.

=== Government of Emil Boc (2008–2012) and Mihai Răzvan Ungureanu ===
At the 2008 legislative election, the PDL won the most seats in chambers and formed a new government coalition with the PSD. The two parties fell out in 2009 and the government was replaced by another one including the Democratic Alliance of Hungarians in Romania (UDMR) and the National Union for the Progress of Romania (UNPR).

Later, in 2012, due to massive street protests, Prime Minister Emil Boc resigned and president Traian Băsescu appointed the independent Mihai Răzvan Ungureanu, former SIE commander, to form a new cabinet which was invested by a vote in Parliament in February 2012. After a two-month parliamentary protest, the opposition managed to pass a motion of no confidence on 5 May 2012, sending the PDL in opposition. When the government fell, Traian Băsescu consulted the parliamentary parties and decided to nominate PSD leader Victor Ponta as Prime Minister.

=== 2012 local elections ===
On 10 June 2012, local elections were held in Romania. The PDL was able to win only two county council presidents (namely in the counties of Arad and Alba) and 10 major city mayors (Cluj-Napoca, Brașov, Arad, Suceava, Drobeta-Turnu Severin, Alba Iulia, Tulcea, Târgu Mureș, Piatra Neamț, and Târgoviște), which represented a crushing defeat, even if the party acquired 27% of Romania's mayors and almost 23% of the county and local councillors.

Because of these results, the then president of PDL, Emil Boc, resigned and called for an early National Convention (congress) of the party, which was held on 30 June 2012. The Convention elected Vasile Blaga to become the new party president of the PDL and Gheorghe Flutur as secretary-general.

=== 2012 parliamentary elections ===
In the run to the parliamentary elections the PDL announced an alliance with the Christian Democratic National Peasants' Party (PNȚ-CD) and Civic Force (FC) to form the Right Romania Alliance (ARD). The alliance was dissolved on 9 December 2013.

=== Breaking up with Băsescu ===
After Băsescu's break with the new president of PD-L, Vasile Blaga, his supporters created the People's Movement Party (PMP) in June 2013. Years later, 2020, Băsescu tried to rename PMP to Democratic-Liberal Party, but he couldn't get PNL's approval for this. Basescu joked, saying that "the followers of the Brătianu family should remain in the PNL, and Petre Roman's followers should come to the PMP, alluding to the FSN-related past of the PD-L.

=== 2014 European elections ===
In the 2014 European elections, the PDL received 12.2% of the national vote and returned 5 MEPs.

=== Merger with the National Liberal Party (PNL) ===
In late May 2014, the party agreed in principle to a future merger with the National Liberal Party (PNL), and for the two parties to submit a joint candidate for the upcoming 2014 presidential election.

On 17 July 2014 it was announced that the new party formed from a future merger of the PDL and PNL would keep the National Liberal Party name, while being situated in the PDL's existing headquarters in Bucharest and would be registered by the end of 2014. On 26 July 2014, a joint party congress of the PDL and PNL approved the merger. On 28 July 2014 the PDL and PNL formed the Christian Liberal Alliance (ACL) to jointly contest the upcoming presidential election. In the first round of the 2014 presidential election held on 2 November 2014, ACL candidate Klaus Iohannis received 30.4% of the vote, coming in second place behind Victor Ponta, the PSD candidate and incumbent Prime Minister. In the runoff election held on 16 November 2014, Iohannis received 54.5% of the vote, becoming the surprise victory of the Romanian presidency.

== Ideology ==
The PDL's ideology is influenced by liberal conservatism and social conservatism. In this respect the party is a member of the European People's Party (EPP) and the Centrist Democrat International (IDC–CDI).

The PDL supports a consolidation of the free market and is supportive of Romania's flat-rate income tax of 16%. The party also supports reforming the Romanian Constitution in order to bring about a decentralisation in administration and give greater power to the country's eight development regions.

== Founding deputies ==
Shortly before the 2008 legislative election the PDL had 69 deputies, of which

- 38 had been elected on Democratic Party (PD) list: Cristian Rădulescu, Daniel Buda, Valentin Adrian Iliescu, Costică Canacheu, Gheorghe Albu, Gheorghe Barbu, Cornel Ștefan Bardan, Iulian-Gabriel Bîrsan, Anca-Daniela Boagiu, Ionela Bruchental-Pop, Diana Maria Bușoi, Anca Constantinescu, Radu-Cătălin Drăguș, Stelian Duțu, Elena Ehling, Stelian Fuia, Traian Constantin Igaș, Cristian Ilie, Radu Lambrino, Laurențiu Mironescu, Liviu Alexandru Miroșeanu, Alexandru Mocanu, Petru Movilă, Ioan Oltean, Constantin Petrea, Marcel Adrian Piteiu, Corneliu Popescu, Cezar Florin Preda, Ioan Dumitru Puchianu, Marius Rogin, Marcel Laurențiu Romanescu, Valentin Rusu, Petre Străchinaru, Valeriu Tabără, Eugen Constantin Uricec, Mihaela Adriana Vasil, Horia Văsioiu, Iulian Vladu
- 14 had been elected on National Liberal Party (PNL) list: Marian Sorin Paveliu, Romică Andreica, Cristian Alexandru Boureanu, Dumitru Gheorghe Mircea Coșea, Marian Hoinaru, Mircea Teodor Iustian, Corneliu Momanu, Viorel Oancea, Dumitru Pardău, Gabriel Sandu, Cornel Știrbeț, Raluca Turcan, Petre Ungureanu, Claudius Mihail Zaharia
- 10 had been elected on Greater Romania Party (PRM) list: Liviu Almășan, William Gabriel Brînză, Bogdan Cantaragiu, Petru Călian, Alexandru Ciocâlteu, Liviu Codîrlă, Daniel Ionescu, Dănuț Liga, Dumitru Puzdrea, Ion Stoica
- 6 had been elected on Social Democratic Party (PSD) list: Constantin Amarie, Obuf Cătălin Ovidiu Buhăianu, Viorel Constantinescu, Petru Lificiu, Gheorghe Sârb, Constantin Tudor
- 1 had been elected on Conservative Party (PC) list: Grațiela Denisa Iordache

== Leadership of PDL ==
Also served as Prime Minister
Also served as Senate President

Nº	Name Born - Died	Portrait	Term start	Term end	Duration
1	Emil Boc (1966–)		15 December 2007	30 June 2012	4 years, 6 months and 15 days
2	Vasile Blaga^{1} (1956–)		30 June 2012	17 November 2014	2 years, 4 months and 18 days

== Notable members ==
- Vasile Blaga, party leader from 2012 to 2014, former Interior Minister;
- Roberta Anastase, MP, President of the Chamber of Deputies;
- Adrian Bădulescu, MP;
- Traian Băsescu, President of Romania, membership suspended during his term;
- Radu Berceanu, Senator, former Transport Minister;
- Anca Boagiu, former Minister of European Integration and Transport Minister;
- Emil Boc, Mayor of Cluj-Napoca, party leader (2004–2012), Prime Minister (2008–2012);
- Ioan Oltean, MP;
- Elena Udrea, Minister of Tourism and Regional Development (2008–2012);
- Radu Vasile, former Prime Minister;
- Adriean Videanu, former Mayor of Bucharest and Minister of Economy;
- Monica Macovei, EMP and former Minister of Justice;
- Sulfina Barbu, former Minister of Labour;
- Theodor Stolojan, EMP and former Prime Minister;
- Raluca Turcan, Deputy Prime Minister of Romania;
- Nicolae Ștefănuță, head of PD/PD-L's Department of European Politics and Affairs.

== Electoral history ==
=== Legislative elections ===
Election	Chamber			Senate			Position	Aftermath
Election	Votes	%	Seats	Votes	%	Seats	Position	Aftermath
2008	2,312,358	33.57	115 / 334	2,228,860	32.36	51 / 137	1st	PDL-PSD government (2008–2009)
2008	2,312,358	33.57	115 / 334	2,228,860	32.36	51 / 137	1st	PDL-UNPR-UDMR government (2009–2012)
2008	2,312,358	33.57	115 / 334	2,228,860	32.36	51 / 137	1st	Opposition to USL government (2012)
2012	1,223,189	16.51	52 / 412	1,239,318	16.71	22 / 176	2nd (within ARD)^{1}	Opposition to USL government (2012–2014)
2012	1,223,189	16.51	52 / 412	1,239,318	16.71	22 / 176	2nd (within ARD)^{1}	Opposition to PSD-UNPR-UDMR-PC government (2014)
2012	1,223,189	16.51	52 / 412	1,239,318	16.71	22 / 176	2nd (within ARD)^{1}	Absorbed by the National Liberal Party (November 2014)

Notes:

^{1} Right Romania Alliance members: PDL, FC (1 senator and 3 deputies), and PNȚ-CD (1 senator and 1 deputy).

=== Presidential elections ===
Election	Candidate	First round			Second round		
Election	Candidate	Votes	Percentage	Position	Votes	Percentage	Position
2009	Traian Băsescu	3,153,640	32.4%	1st	5,275,808	50.3%	1st
2014	Klaus Iohannis^{1}	2,881,406	30.3%	2nd	6,288,769	54.4%	1st

Notes:

^{1} Klaus Iohannis was a member of the PNL, but he was the candidate of the Christian Liberal Alliance (ACL); alliance members: PNL and PDL.

=== European elections ===
Election	Votes	Percentage	Seats	Position	EU Party	EP Group
2009	1,438,000	29.7%	10 / 33	2nd	EPP	EPP Group
2014	680,853	12.2%	5 / 32	3rd	EPP	EPP Group
