= Ilie Năstase =

Romanian tennis player (born 1946)

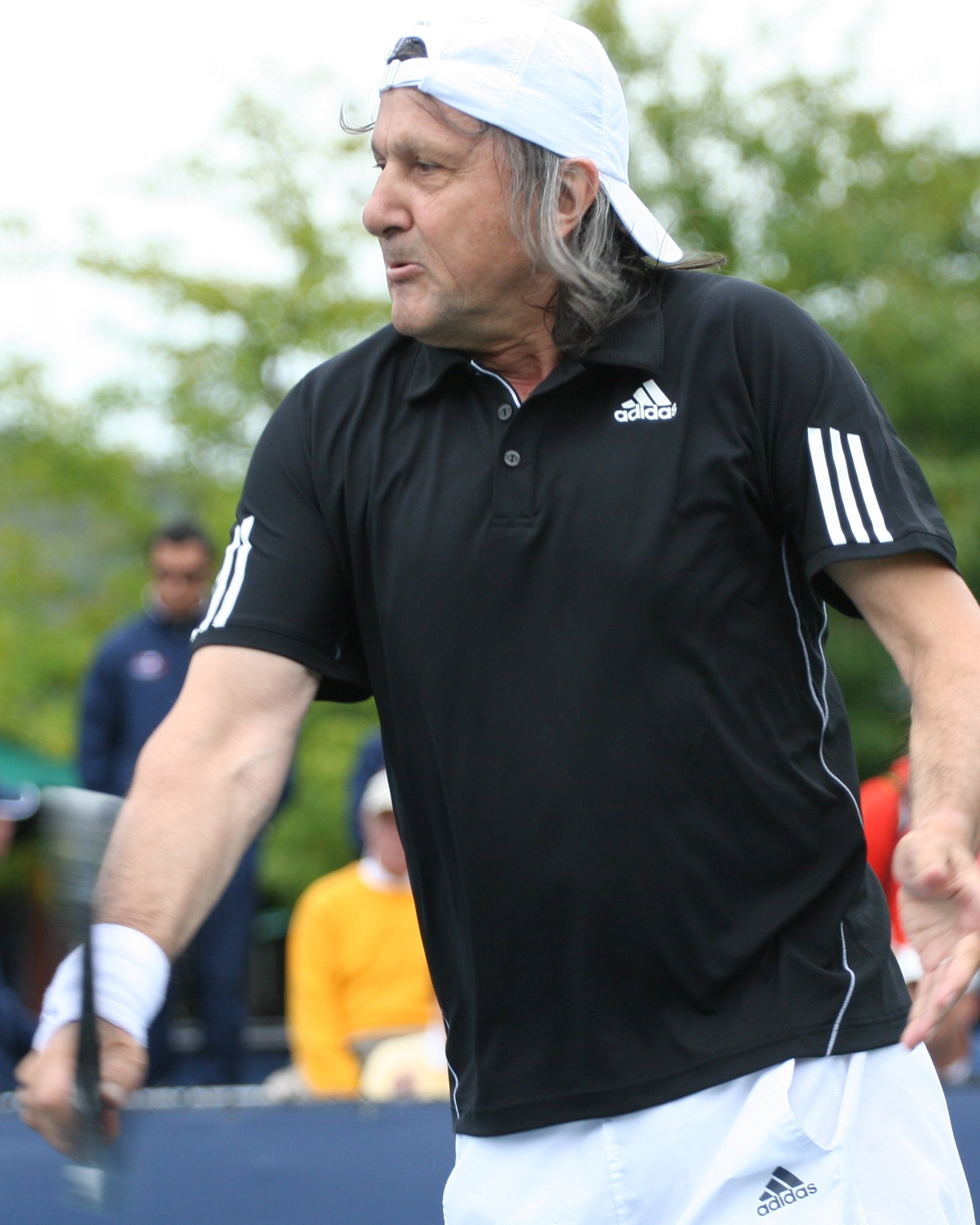
- Năstase at the 2009 US Open
- Country (sports): Romania
- Residence: Constanța
- Born: 19 July 1946 (age 80) Bucharest, Romania
- Height: 1.82 m (6 ft 0 in)
- Turned pro: 1969 (amateur tour from 1966)
- Retired: 1985
- Plays: Right-handed (one-handed backhand)
- Prize money: $2,076,761
- Int. Tennis HoF: 1991 (member page)

Singles
- Career record: 1144–490 in pre Open-Era & Open Era
- Career titles: 64 (9th in the Open Era)
- Highest ranking: No. 1 (23 August 1973)

Grand Slam singles results
- Australian Open: 1R (1981)
- French Open: W (1973)
- Wimbledon: F (1972, 1976)
- US Open: W (1972)

Other tournaments
- Tour Finals: W (1971, 1972, 1973, 1975)
- WCT Finals: QF (1974, 1977, 1978)

Doubles
- Career record: 512–218 (ATP)
- Career titles: 45 (ATP)
- Highest ranking: No. 9 (1 March 1976)

Grand Slam doubles results
- French Open: W (1970)
- Wimbledon: W (1973)
- US Open: W (1975)

Grand Slam mixed doubles results
- Wimbledon: W (1970, 1972)
- US Open: F (1972)

Team competitions
- Davis Cup: F (1969^{Ch}, 1971^{Ch}, 1972)

Senator of Romania
- In office 14 June 2014 – 19 December 2016

Personal details
- Party: Social Democracy Party of Romania (1995–1997); Conservative Party (2014–2015); National Union for the Progress of Romania (2015–2016)

Ilie Theodoriu Năstase (Romanian: [iˈli.e nəsˈtase]; born 19 July 1946) is a Romanian former professional tennis player. He was ranked as the inaugural world No. 1 in men's singles by the Association of Tennis Professionals (ATP) for 40 weeks. Năstase is one of ten players to have won over 100 total ATP-level titles, with 64 in singles and 45 in doubles, among which seven majors: two in singles, three in men's doubles and two in mixed doubles. He also won four Masters Grand Prix year-end championships. He was the first professional sports figure to sign an endorsement contract with Nike, doing so in 1972. Năstase also wrote several novels in French in the 1980s, and was inducted into the International Tennis Hall of Fame in 1991.

== Career ==
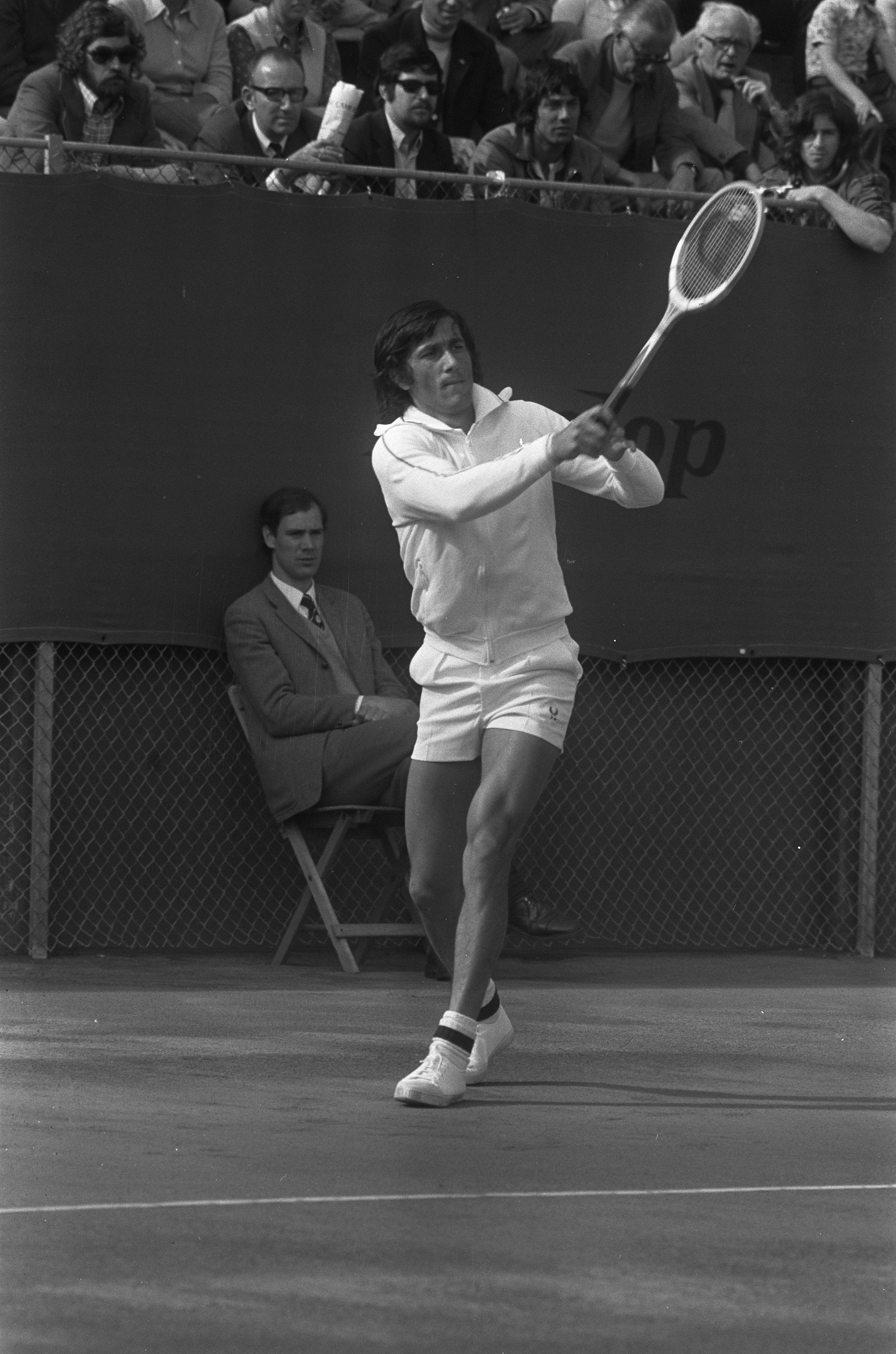
Playing a Davis Cup match against the Netherlands in The Hague (1973)

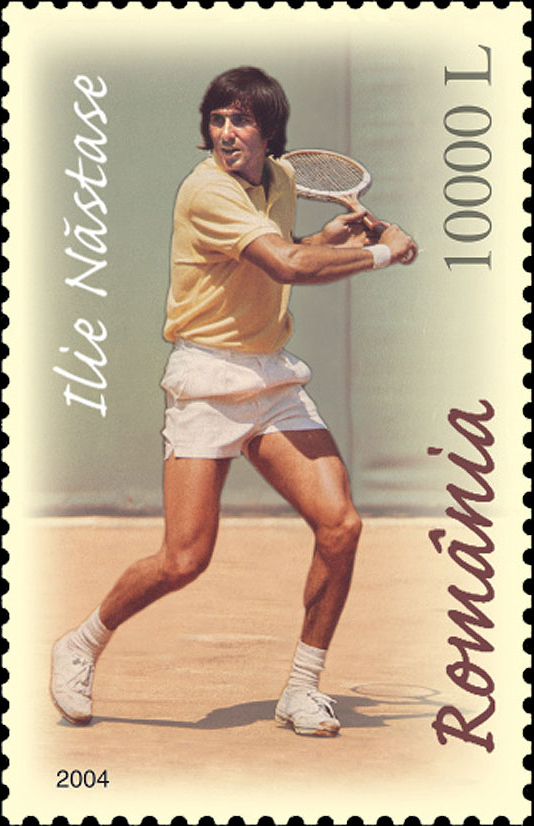
2004 Romanian stamp

At the beginning of his career in 1966, Năstase traveled around the world competing with Ion Țiriac. They represented Romania in the Davis Cup competition, being runners up in 1969, 1971, and 1972. In singles, Năstase won his first tournament at Cannes on 16 April 1967. His first victories against top players happened in 1969 in Stockholm, where he defeated Tony Roche and Stan Smith. Năstase became one of the best players in 1970, with many experts ranking him as the sixth-best player in the world at that time, behind the Australians Rod Laver, Ken Rosewall, John Newcombe, and Tony Roche and the American Arthur Ashe. Năstase's high ranking resulted from his success at the Italian Open in Rome and at the U.S. Indoor Open in Salisbury, Maryland. With Tiriac, Năstase won the men's doubles title at the French Open. In 1971, Năstase was the runner-up at the French Open, where he lost the final in four sets to Jan Kodeš. In December, Năstase won his first Masters Grand Prix title, finishing in front of Stan Smith in a round robin competition.

In 1972, at Wimbledon, Năstase narrowly lost to Stan Smith in an epic five-set final, one of the more exciting championship matches. He won the US Open in a five-set final over Ashe, despite trailing 2 sets to 1 and 4-2 in the fourth set. This tournament was the only event of the year in which all the best players participated. In the Davis Cup, Năstase was undefeated in singles until losing to Stan Smith in the final played on clay in his native Bucharest. In December at the year-end tour finals, Năstase defeated Smith, winning his second consecutive Masters Grand Prix title.

In 1973, Năstase won 17 tournaments, including the French Open where he beat 33-year-old Nikola Pilić in the final in straight sets. "Throughout the match it was Nastase's backhand that won the points". He also won a doubles title at Wimbledon, and a third Masters title. He was the world No. 1 in the ATP rankings that year. He also won the 'Martini and Rossi' Award, voted for by a panel of journalists and was ranked No. 1 by an international poll of 17 tennis writers, Tennis Magazine (U.S.), Bud Collins, Rino Tommasi and Rex Bellamy. In the Davis Cup, he won seven of eight singles rubbers. In matches against the other top players, Năstase was 1–0 against Newcombe and 1–1 against Smith. The Romanian won the French Open without dropping a set (a feat repeated by Björn Borg in 1978 and 1980 and by Rafael Nadal in 2008, 2010, 2017 and 2020), and he won the French Open (clay), Rome (clay) and Queen's Club (grass) in succession. Năstase was seeded No. 2 for Wimbledon, behind the defending champion Stan Smith. When the newly formed ATP withdrew its players from the tournament following the suspension by the ITF of Yugoslav Nikola Pilić, only three ATP players (Năstase, Roger Taylor and Ray Keldie) defied the boycott and were fined by the ATP's disciplinary committee. Năstase was promoted to No. 1 seed for the players in the subsequently weakened field and publicly stated his support for the ATP action but insisted that as a serving captain, he was under orders from the Romanian army and government to compete and thus could not boycott the tournament. Some contemporary press speculation, and later biographies have suggested Năstase contrived to lose his fourth-round match to American Sandy Mayer, but to have lost any earlier to a considerably less able player would have been too obvious. Năstase never has commented publicly on this speculation.

In 1974, he was the only player to qualify for both the WCT Finals and the Masters Grand Prix finals. Năstase played well in the Masters, in particular against Newcombe in the semifinals. (Năstase finished his career with a 4–1 record versus Newcombe, losing only their first match in 1969.) The Romanian, however, lost the final to Guillermo Vilas in five sets.

For the fifth consecutive year, Năstase reached the Masters Grand Prix final in 1975, where he defeated Björn Borg in three straight sets.

During the first half of 1976, Năstase won four tournaments (Atlanta WCT, Avis Challenge Cup WCT, US Open Indoor, and La Costa), and head-to-head, he led Connors 2–1, Vilas 1–0, Ashe 1–0, and Borg 2–0. Năstase did not enter the Australian Open, which was again avoided by most of the top players. Năstase was prevented from entering the French Open because he participated in World Team Tennis. In the second half of the year, third-seeded Năstase lost in straight sets to Borg in the men's singles final of Wimbledon and in the semifinals of the US Open. Năstase won three other tournaments during the second half of the year, the Pepsi Grand Slam, South Orange, and the four-man tournament of Caracas, Venezuela, in October (not to be confused with the Caracas WCT tournament in March), making seven tournament championships for the year. Năstase was the world No. 3, behind Connors and Borg.

In 1977, Năstase finished No. 9 in the ATP rankings. He was a quarterfinalist at the French Open and at Wimbledon (losing to Borg), and participated in the WCT Finals. During his quarterfinal match at Wimbledon Năstase had a row with umpire Jeremy Shales. Shales called him "Năstase" when asking him to move to the advantage court, "like a master speaks to a naughty schoolboy." (Năstase has also said Shales asked him to pick up a piece of paper that had blown onto the court, saying, "Năstase, pick up that paper.") Năstase angrily replied "You call me Mr. Năstase!". Mr. Nastase later became the title of his autobiography.

He was still one of the 20 best players in 1978; at Wimbledon, he again reached the quarterfinals.

Năstase retired from the tour in October 1985 at the age of 39 after playing in the Grand Prix de Tennis de Toulouse, but he did play the challenger tournament at Dijon in June 1988.

== Controversies ==
Năstase earned the nickname "Nasty" early in his career, after routinely acting in an inappropriate manner on court, making himself disliked by competitors and fans alike. He would at times avoid the lockerroom after tennis matches, to avert direct confrontation with players he had antagonized on the court.

In the second round of the 1976 US Open against Hans-Jürgen Pohmann, there were several controversial moments involving Năstase. At 5–5 in the third and final set Năstase was furious at a photographer and hit a ball at him and swung his racket near him. The crowd were at fever pitch by this point. Then Pohmann began cramping badly in his leg. With the aid of the tournament physician, who attended the leg, Pohmann saved three match points and the set entered a final set tie-break. Năstase was screaming at the umpire and directing obscenities at the crowd. Pohmann had two match points but Năstase won and then screamed at Pohmann as the two approached the net. The umpire refused to shake Năstase's hand as Ilie continued raving. Many thought Năstase should have been disqualified. Later, Năstase claimed the match should have been forfeited to him when Pohmann was unable to continue play immediately (he and Pohmann had to be separated in the clubhouse after the match).

In October 1977 at the Raquette d'Or tournament, Năstase used a 'spaghetti string' (double-strung) racket to end Guillermo Vilas's 46-match winning streak. The racket was known for creating large amounts of top spin and unpredictable bounces. Vilas quit the match in protest at the use of the racket. A few days later, the ATP banned the use of such racquets.

During the US Open in 1979, Năstase was defaulted from his match against John McEnroe. The umpire previously docked Năstase a point in the third set and then a game in the fourth for arguing and stalling. A near-riot followed as the crowd disagreed with the umpire's decision, throwing beer cans and cups on court. The match was restarted, with the umpire being replaced, before McEnroe won.

In 1994 Năstase, Davis Cup captain of his country, was banned for an away match against Great Britain, for "'audible obscenities and constant abuse and intimidation of officials'" in a tie against South Africa.

In 2017, while captaining his country's Fed Cup team against Great Britain, Năstase was overheard commenting about the color of Serena Williams' unborn child, and the then 71-year-old asked Britain's 33 year old Fed Cup captain Anne Keothavong for her room number while posing for photographers. Năstase previously made unfounded comments about Williams allegedly doping. Before Great Britain and Romania began their two-day World Group play-off, Năstase allegedly stormed in to the media centre to confront British journalists over the reporting of his comments the previous day. Năstase could only find Press Association tennis correspondent Eleanor Crook before launching into a tirade about the reporting.

During the second rubber, after the crowd had been told to respect the players, he said to match umpire Andreas Egli: "It's not the opera, what's your fucking problem?" He was ultimately ejected from the stadium for unsportsmanlike conduct. In a statement the International Tennis Federation (ITF) additionally confirmed that Năstase had his accreditation removed and would take no further part in the tie. The next day, the ITF provisionally suspended Năstase under the Fed Cup Regulations for a breach of the Fed Cup Welfare Policy, meaning that he was banned from the site of any ITF event. When Năstase was ejected from the stadium he met Crook again and, separated by a large number of security guards, verbally attacked her. The next day, despite being banned from the venue, Năstase reappeared and went to have lunch in the onsite restaurant. He additionally sent flowers to the British team. On 21 July 2017, he was suspended by the ITF until 2021.

Williams released a statement on social media branding the comments about her unborn child as racist, noting that it saddened her that we live in a society where these comments can be made. Năstase then apologised on social media regarding the comments he made about Williams, but made comments about Johanna Konta speaking to the umpire which upset him. In a further interview with the BBC, Năstase justified his comments to Konta, stating that he only abused her after being ejected from the court and did so as a fan rather than a captain. Năstase also said that he regretted his behaviour in the incident. Năstase was not invited to the 2017 French Open and Wimbledon following his suspension. The Madrid Open, however, invited Năstase to be part of the prizegiving ceremony, which was won by Romanian Simona Halep. This was deemed irresponsible by the WTA, which had revoked Năstase's privileges while the ITF carried out its investigation.

Allegations of inappropriate behaviour included Pam Shriver claiming Năstase frequently asked in a joking manner if she was still a virgin. After about 30 occasions of this happening, Shriver asked him to stop asking that, which he did. Dominique Monami, captain of the Belgium team, said that Năstase had verbally abused her in a 2017 Fed Cup match against Romania.

== Playing style ==
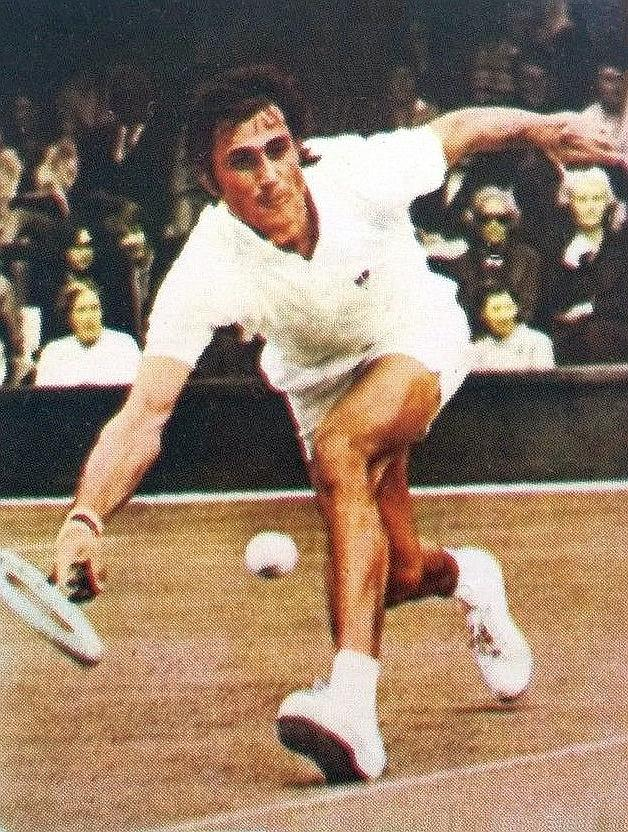
Năstase in 1973

Considered one of the most gifted tennis players in history, Năstase was noted for his ability to entertain, amusing spectators with his antics and mimicry. Even during a crucial phase of a match, he was likely to do something bizarre that would entertain the crowd.

Ilie Năstase was known for his speed and shot variety, including effective lobs and defensive retrievals. He used spin to place shots in difficult positions for opponents. Contemporary accounts also note that his on-court behavior could be inconsistent, with fluctuations in composure and temperament affecting performance at times.

Năstase pioneered a distinctive tennis shot, a backward, over-the-shoulder wrist-flick useful as a last resort in recovering lobs. Tennis writer Bud Collins dubbed the shot the "Bucharest Backfire" after Năstase.

According to The Independent, Năstase is remembered for being one of the better players never to win the singles title at Wimbledon, for his tantrums, and his physical appearance.

== Athletic distinctions ==
- Năstase has the all-time highest winning percentage (88%, 22 wins and only 3 losses) in the year ending tournaments (today ATP Tour Finals) winning four times, in 1971, 1972, 1973 and 1975.
- He is one of the five tennis players (third place) in the world who won more than 100 pro titles (57 singles and 45 doubles) according to the ATP website, though there are many titles that are not included in the ATP statistics.
- Năstase was the first professional sports figure to sign an endorsement contract with Nike.

== Awards and accolades ==
- Năstase was inducted into the International Tennis Hall of Fame in 1991.
- In March 2009, Năstase was made a knight of the France's Legion d'honneur, being acclaimed for his "impressive sporting career" and "the sense of spectacle" he created when playing.
- On 19 July 2016, his 70th birthday, Năstase received the Star of Romania, his country's highest civil award, for services to sport.

== Political career ==
He holds the rank of major general in the Romanian military. He entered Romanian politics in 1995, joining the Social Democracy Party of Romania and making an unsuccessful run for mayor of Bucharest in 1996. Elected to the Romanian Senate for a Bucharest seat in 2012, he initially sat for the Conservative Party (PC), then subsequently switching to the National Union for the Progress of Romania (UNPR) in July 2015 after the former party ceased to exist. He left the UNPR in 2016, after it merged with the People's Movement Party.

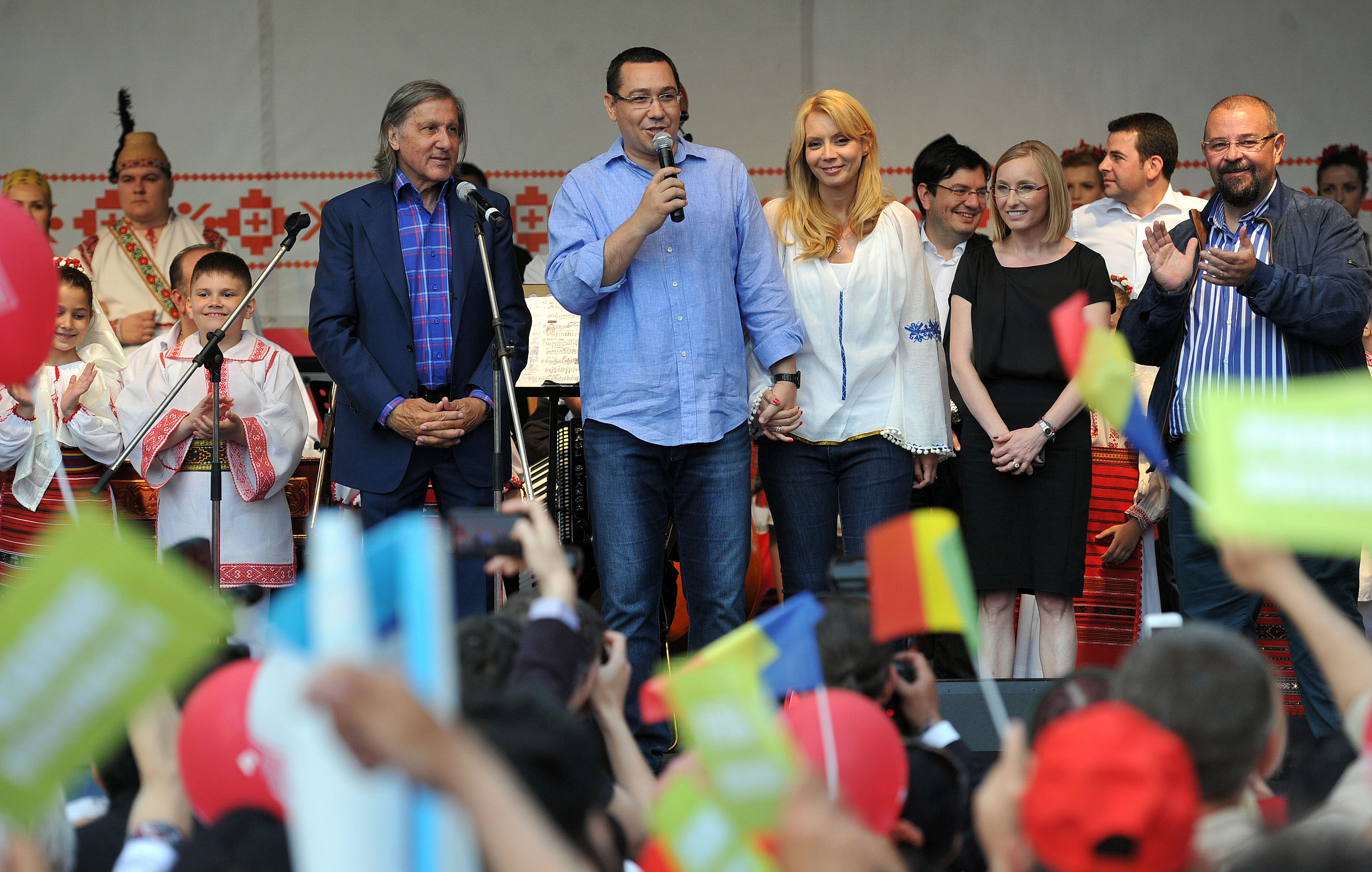
USD meeting in 2014. From left to right: Ilie Năstase, Victor Ponta, Daciana Sârbu, Nicolae Bănicioiu, Daniel Constantin, Cristian Popescu Piedone

== Personal life ==
Ilie Năstase is a sport romanian personality. His mother was born în Căinari (present-day Moldova), and his parents lived in Soroca before the Soviet occupation of Bessarabia and Northern Bukovina. His grandfather was deported in Siberia by the Soviet authorities.

Năstase has been married five times: his first wife was Dominique Grazia, a Belgian fashion model, whom he wed at the age of 26 and whom he was married to for 10 years, and with whom he has a daughter, Nathalie. His second wife was American actress Alexandra King, whom he married in 1984, and with whom he adopted two children, Nicholas and Charlotte. His third wife was Romanian fashion model Amalia Teodosescu, whom he married in 2004. They have two children, Alessia and Emma Alexandra. After they split in 2010, he married Romanian fashion model Brigitte Sfăt in 2013; their marriage ended in 2018. In 2019, he married Ioana Simion.

Maxim has placed Năstase at number 6 on its "Living Sex Legends" list, as he is reputed to have slept with over 2,500 women. Năstase's own estimate of 800 to 900 was too low for the writer of his biography who wanted a larger number to improve his reputation. After hearing this, his third wife, Amalia, said that she was happy to have conquered such a man. Năstase met Amalia at a Sting concert and married her in a Greek Orthodox ceremony on 5 June 2004, followed by a civil ceremony in July of the same year. They divorced in February 2010, after six years of marriage.

As he played for the Army's sports club Steaua, he was an employee of the Ministry of Defence.

In 2010 he appeared in the "Be free" video of Smiley's band Radio Killer alongside footballers Ioan Lupescu and Ousmane N'Doye.

On 25 May 2018, Năstase was arrested twice within a six-hour span for drunk-driving and riding a scooter through a red light.

He was involved in an animation project, and provides the Romanian voice of the federal agent in the Disney movie "G-Force".

During the second season of "Masked Singer România", Năstase appeared as "Bufnița" on 9 September 2021. He sang "My Way" by Frank Sinatra, unmasking himself before the audience vote for elimination.

== Career statistics ==
=== Singles performance timeline ===
Key
W	F	SF	QF	#R	RR	Q#	DNQ	A	NH

(W) winner; (F) finalist; (SF) semifinalist; (QF) quarterfinalist; (#R) rounds 4, 3, 2, 1; (RR) round-robin stage; (Q#) qualification round; (DNQ) did not qualify; (A) absent; (NH) not held; (SR) strike rate (events won / competed); (W–L) win–loss record.

Qualifying matches and walkovers are neither official match wins nor losses.

Tournament	1966	1967	1968	1969	1970	1971	1972	1973	1974	1975	1976	1977	1978	1979	1980	1981	1982	1983	1984	1985	SR	W–L	Win%
Grand Slam tournaments
Australian Open	A	A	A	A	A	A	A	A	A	A	A	A	A	A	A	1R	A	A	A	A	0 / 1	0–1	0.00
French Open	3R	3R	2R	1R	QF	F	1R	W	QF	3R	A	QF	A	1R	A	3R	2R	3R	1R	A	1 / 16	37–15	71.15
Wimbledon	1R	1R	A	3R	4R	2R	F	4R	4R	2R	F	QF	QF	A	3R	1R	1R	A	A	A	0 / 15	35–15	70.00
US Open	A	A	A	4R	A	3R	W	2R	3R	QF	SF	2R	A	2R	2R	1R	4R	1R	1R	1R	1 / 15	29–14	67.44
Win–loss	2–2	2–2	1–1	5–3	7–2	9–3	13–2	11–2	9–3	7–3	10–2	9–3	4–1	1–2	3–2	2–4	4–3	2–2	0–2	0–1	2 / 47	101–45	69.18
Year-end championships
Masters Cup	NH				A	W	W	W	F	W	A										4 / 5	22–3	88.00
National representation
Davis Cup	P	P	P	F	P	F	F	SF	QF	P	P	QF		P	QF		1R	2R	1R		0 / 17	74–22	77.08
Career statistics
Tournaments	2	2	7	22	21	21	32	32	28	26	24	21	22	22	19	27	24	11	12	4	379		
Titles / Finals	0–0	0–0	0–2	2–3	2–4	8–13	12–16	16–19	7–12	6–10	6–13	3–5	2–5	0–1	0–0	0–2	0–0	0–0	0–0	0–0	64 / 104	64–40	61.54
Overall win–loss	2-2	2-2	23-6	40–26	60–21	85–12	120–20	125–18	80–21	93–21	78–15	49–19	44–21	32–26	25–24	25–27	16–26	8–13	4–14	1–4	912 / 1250	912–338	72.96
YE ranking	–	–	–	–	–	–	–	1	10	7	3	9	16	50	79	73	118	169	202	431	$2,076,761		

=== Records ===
- These records were attained in the Open Era of tennis.

Championship	Years	Record accomplished	Player tied
Masters Grand Prix/ATP Finals	1971–1975	88.00% (22–3) match winning percentage	Stands alone
Grand Prix Tour	1968–1985	42 five set match wins	Stands alone
WCT Challenge Cup	1976–1978	3 singles titles	Stands alone
Omaha Open	1972–1973	2 singles titles	Stands alone

== Books ==
- Ar fi fost prea frumos (1972; with Ion Tiriac)
- Tie-Break (1985), also published as Break Point
- The Net (Le filet, 1986)
- Mr Nastase: The Autobiography (Mr Năstase: Autobiografia, 2004; with Debbie Breckerman)

== See also ==
- Tennis male players statistics

Achievements
Preceded by —	World No. 1; 23 August 1973 – 2 June 1974	Succeeded by John Newcombe
