= 2012 Romanian local elections =

Romanian elections in 2012

Local elections were held in Romania on 10 June 2012. The Government initially tried to postpone the election to be on the same day with the 2012 Romanian legislative election, but a ruling of the Constitutional court made that option impossible. As of June 2011, a law was passed by the parliament, and promulgated by the president, in which the mayors and the presidents of the County Councils will be elected with in a First Past the Post system.

Will be elected:

- all the villages, communes, cities, and municipal councils (Local Councils, Romanian: Consilii Locale), and the Sectors Local Councils of Bucharest (Romanian: Consilii Locale de Sector)
- the 41 County Councils (Romanian: Consilii Județene), and the Bucharest Municipal General Council (Romanian: Consiliul General Al Municipiului București).
- the 41 Presidents of the County Councils (Romanian: Președinții Consiliilor Județene)
- all the mayors (Romanian: Primarii)
  - of the communes, cities, and municipalities
  - of the Sectors of Bucharest (Romanian: Primarii de Sector)
  - The General Mayor of The Municipality of Bucharest (Romanian: Primarul General al Municipiului București)

== Results ==
Summary of the 10 and 24 June 2012 Romanian local election results
Party	County Councils Presidents (PCJ)			County Council seats (CJ)			Mayors (P)			Local Councils seats (CL)		
Party	Votes	%	Seats	Votes	%	Seats	Votes	%	Seats	Votes	%	Seats
Social Liberal Union (PSD, PNL, and PC)^{[a]} (Uniunea Social Liberală - USL)	4,260,709	49.71	36	4,203,007	49.68	723	2,782,792	33.99	1,292	2,630,123	32.74	12,668
Social Democratic Party^{[a]} (Partidul Social Democrat - PSD)	—	—	22	8,666	0.10	3	731,597	8.93	373	682,378	8.49	4,046
Centre Right Alliance (PNL and PC)^{[c]} (Alianța de Centru-Dreapta - ACD)	—	—	14	—	—	—	52,938	0.64	27	43,532	0.54	244
National Liberal Party^{[a]} (Partidul Național Liberal - PNL)	9,249	0.10	13	4,755	0.05	2	586,050	7.15	263	532,488	6.63	3,101
Conservative Party^{[a]} (Partidul Conservator)	—	—	1	611	0.00	0	62,591	0.76	14	69,687	0.86	381
Democratic Liberal Party^{[b]} (Partidul Democrat-Liberal - PDL)	1,268,611	14.80	2	1,289,680	15.24	212	1,241,802	15.17	488	1,116,312	13.89	6,155
People's Party – Dan Diaconescu (Partidul Poporului – Dan Diaconescu - PP-DD)	787,143	9.18	0	757,194	8.95	134	577,195	7.05	31	668,234	8.32	3,021
Democratic Alliance of Hungarians in Romania (Uniunea Democrată Maghiară din România - UDMR)	467,420	5.45	2	473,783	5.60	88	400,627	4.89	202	435,205	5.41	2,248
National Union for the Progress of Romania (Uniunea Națională pentru Progresul României - UNPR)	168,900	1.97	1	204,083	2.41	13	205,274	2.50	24	218,465	2.72	972
Greater Romania Party (Partidul România Mare - PRM)	150,907	1.76	0	170,667	2.01	0	107,431	1.31	6	172,114	2.14	596
Ecologist Party of Romania (Partidul Ecologist Român - PER)	63,650	0.74	0	82,581	0.97	2	34,227	0.41	3	59,883	0.74	177
Green Party (Partidul Verde - PV)	80,697	0.94	0	63,508	0.75	0	24,131	0.29	2	39,199	0.48	113
Democratic Forum of Germans in Romania (Forumul Democrat al Germanilor din România; Demokratischen Forums der Deutschen in Rumänien - FDGR/DFDR)	69,445	0.81	0	62,085	0.73	11	15,540	0.18	8	18,847	0.23	57
Christian Democratic National Peasants' Party (Partidul Național Țărănesc Creștin Democrat - PNȚCD)	31,077	0.36	0	44,733	0.52	0	19,910	0.24	3	38,549	0.47	142
New Generation Party (Partidul Noua Generație - Creștin Democrat - PNG)	8,377	0.09	0	17,702	0.20	0	12,033	0.14	1	26,381	0.32	108
Other competitors^{[d]}	1,204,432	14.09	0	1,077,031	12.79	15	1,331,402	16.26	384	1,280,049	16.02	5,092
Total:	8,570,617	100	41	8,460,086	100	1,338	8,185,540	100	3,121	8,031,446	100	39,121
Invalid votes			—			—			—			—
Notes: 1. PSD, PNL and PC ran as USL at county level and in the Capital, except in Covasna County, as well as in several other cities and communes. In some cities and communes the three parties ran in other alliances.; 2. PDL ran by itself and in various alliances with different parties through the country. The main color used was light green, despite the official colors still being orange and blue, as used in Cluj.; 3. Alliance between PNL and PC in some of the cities and communes.; 4. Including PDL in various alliances.
Source: Central Electoral Bureau provisional results Archived 2013-06-05 at the Wayback Machine

Summary of the 10 June 2012 Bucharest local election results
Party	General Mayor of Bucharest (PGMB)			General Council of Bucharest seats (CGMB)		
Party	Votes	%	Seats	Votes	%	Seats
Social Liberal Union^{[a]} (Uniunea Social Liberală); Sorin Oprescu	430,512	54.79	1	436,513	55.65	37
Democratic Liberal Party (Partidul Democrat Liberal); Silviu Prigoană	134,552	17.12	0	129,644	16.52	11
People's Party – Dan Diaconescu (Partidul Poporului – Dan Diaconescu); Horia Mocanu	74,290	9.45	0	83,764	10.67	7
Nicuşor Daniel Dan (Independent)	66,649	8.48	0	36,948	4.71	0
New Generation Party (Partidul Noua Generație - Creștin Democrat); George Becali	25,076	3.19	0	12,279	1.56	0
National Union for the Progress of Romania (Uniunea Națională pentru Progresul României); Anghel Iordănescu	16,095	2.04	0	22,936	2.92	0
Greater Romania Party (Partidul România Mare); Petre Popeangă	8,913	1.13	0	14,984	1.91	0
Other competitors	29,652	3,77	0	47,299	6.03	
Total:	785,739	100	1	784,367	100	55
Invalid votes			—			—
Source: Central Electoral Bureau final results and attributed mandates

Notes

1. Sorin Oprescu ran as an independent for the seat of General Mayor of Bucharest, but was supported by the USL.

== Electoral maps ==
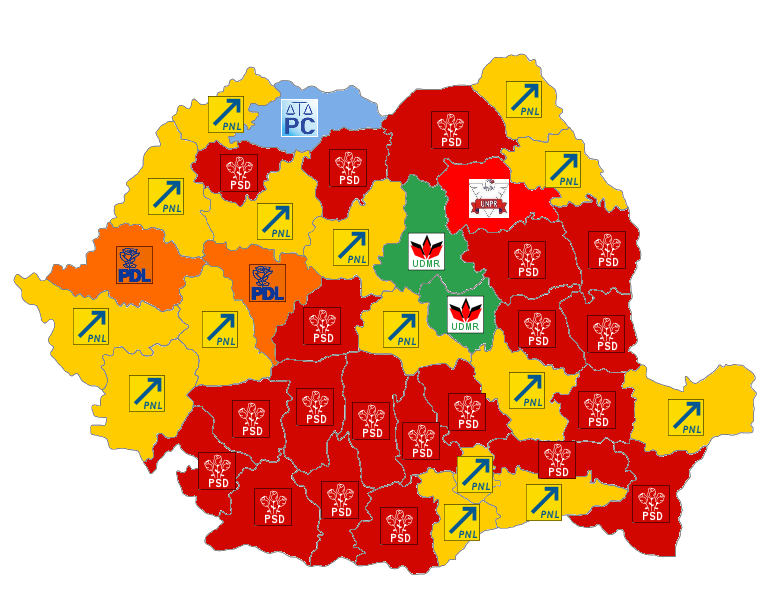
Political map depicting counties according to the county president's party affiliation

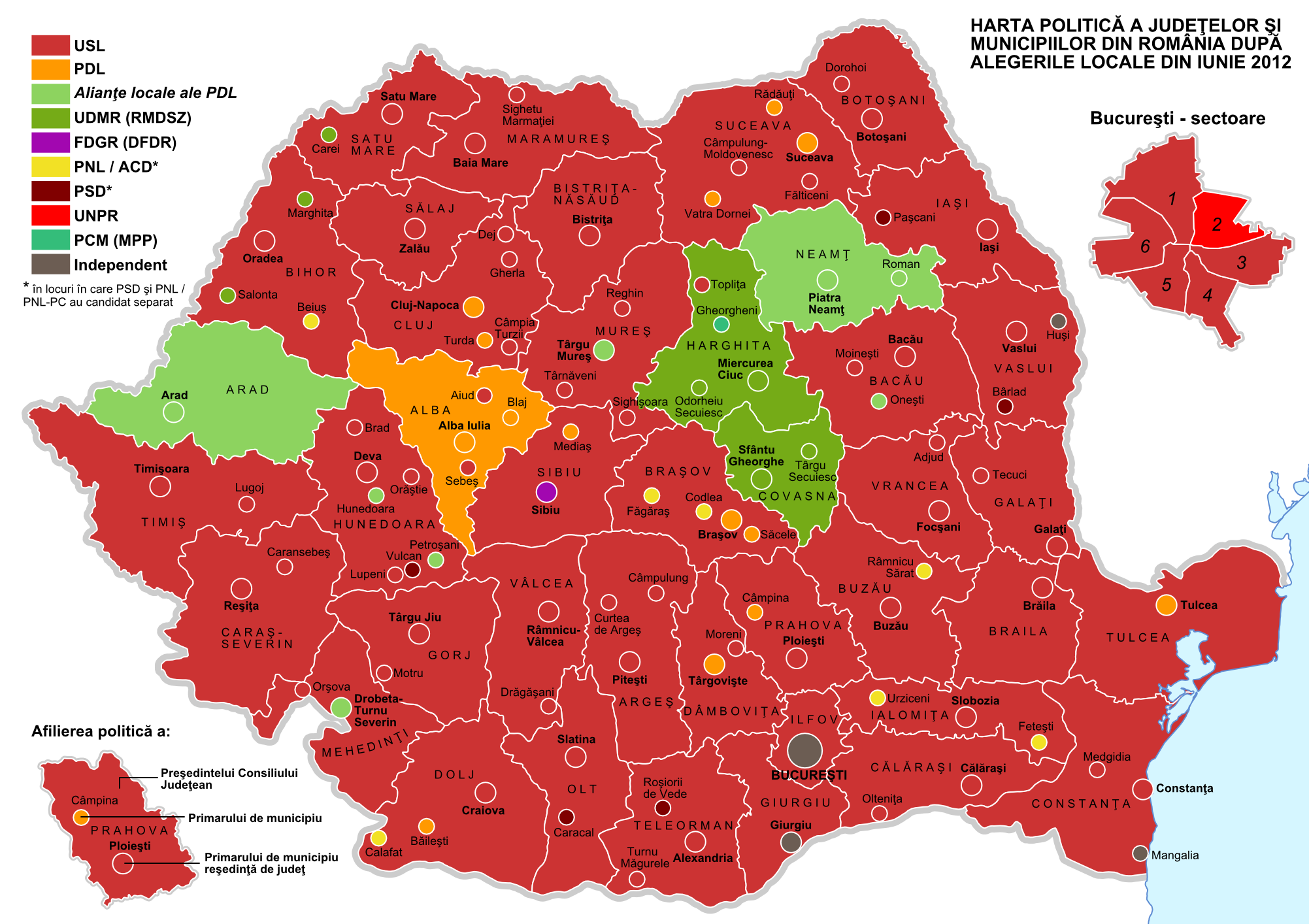
Political map based on the mayor's party affiliation (denoting only major Romanian cities and towns)
