= Neagu Mihai =

Romanian politician

Neagu Mihai (born December 2, 1955) is a Romanian politician who served in the Senate from 2012 to 2016. He represented a seat for Suceava County. A member of the Conservative Party when elected, he was an independent from December 2013 to the following March, when he entered the National Union for the Progress of Romania, remaining with that party until its dissolution in mid-2016. At that point, he followed the UNPR into the People's Movement Party. He declined to run for re-election in 2016.
