= Centre Left Alliance =

Centre Left Alliance Alianţa de Centru Stânga
- Party Presidents: Victor Ponta (PSD); Gabriel Oprea (UNPR)
- Founded: 9 August 2012
- Dissolved: 25 February 2014^{[a]}
- Ideology: Social democracy Left-wing nationalism
- Political position: Centre-left
- Colors: Red

The Centre Left Alliance (Romanian: Alianţa de Centru Stânga, ACS) is a former political alliance between the Social Democratic Party (PSD) and the National Union for the Progress of Romania (UNPR) founded in August 2012.

The alliance was part of the Social Liberal Union (USL) together with the Conservative Party (PC) and the National Liberal Party (PNL), the latter two part of the no longer functioning ACD. PSD and UNPR had common parliamentary groups and at one point planned a merger.

== Electoral history ==
=== Legislative elections ===
Election	Chamber			Senate			Position	Aftermath
Election	Votes	%	Seats	Votes	%	Seats	Position	Aftermath
2012	4,344,288	58.63	159 / 412	4,457,526	60.10	63 / 176	1st (within USL)^{1}	USL government (2012–2014)
2012	4,344,288	58.63	159 / 412	4,457,526	60.10	63 / 176	1st (within USL)^{1}	PSD-UNPR-UDMR-PC government (2014)
2012	4,344,288	58.63	159 / 412	4,457,526	60.10	63 / 176	1st (within USL)^{1}	PSD-UNPR-ALDE^{2} government (2014–2015)

Notes:

^{1} USL was an alliance of two smaller alliances: Centre Left Alliance (ACS) and Centre Right Alliance (ACD). Centre Left Alliance (ACS) members: PSD (58 senators and 149 deputies) and UNPR (5 senators and 10 deputies). The Centre Right Alliance (ACD) members were the PNL (51 senators and 101 deputies) and the PC (8 senators and 13 deputies).
^{2} ALDE was created in June 2015 from a merger of PLR (a splinter of PNL) and PC.
