= Gușă =

Gușă is a Romanian surname. Notable people with the surname include:

- Cozmin Gușă (born 1970), Romanian physicist, journalist and politician
- Ștefan Gușă (1940–1994), Romanian general
