= People's Party – Dan Diaconescu =

People's Party – Dan Diaconescu Partidul Poporului - Dan Diaconescu
- President: Simona-Alice Man
- Secretary-General: Liviu-Robert Neagu
- Leader in the Chamber of Deputies: Dumitru Niculescu
- Founder: Dan Diaconescu
- Founded: 2011
- Dissolved: 29 June 2015
- Preceded by: People's Party (claimed, not legal predecessor)
- Merged into: UNPR (officially)
- Succeeded by: AUR (claimed by Diaconescu)
- Headquarters: Bucharest, Romania
- Ideology: Centrism (self-proclaimed); Left-wing populism Left-wing nationalism Socialism
- Political position: Left-wing to far-left
- European affiliation: EUDemocrats
- Colours: White; Purple

Website
- http://www.partidul.poporului.ro/

The People's Party – Dan Diaconescu (Romanian: Partidul Poporului – Dan Diaconescu; abbreviated PP-DD) was a left-wing populist and socialist political party in Romania created in 2011 by television presenter Dan Diaconescu. In June 2015 it merged into the National Union for the Progress of Romania (UNPR) after Diaconescu was convicted of extortion.

== Origins ==
Since the events of December 1989, which led to the fall of the communist regime, Romania has undergone one of the most problematic transformations from the socialist planned economy to neoliberal capitalism in Central and Eastern Europe. After the adoption of the first and only post-communist constitution in 1991, Romania was subject to social unrest; austerity, deregulation and privatization made poverty rates, unemployment and inflation soar, and street riots were quelled on several occasions by the intervention of guard brigades of mine workers, with the last such occurrence taking place as late as in 1999. The economic neoliberal reforms that picked up pace after the fall of Ion Iliescu and his Social Democratic Party from power further fuelled dissent and caused a spectacular rise in nationalism and populism in Romanian politics.

Populists that emerged on the Romanian political scene denounced impoverished, corruption, privatization as well as abuses of power that were brought about by the capitalist reforms, and called for justice against the establishment that they blamed for the injustice caused by the transition. The Romanian post-1990 populism was of distinctively left-wing yet nationalist character, embodying the sense of loss of Romanian sovereignty along with the deprivation of social stability that existed under socialism - employment, security, order, equality, protection, feeling of belonging. The intensification of the post-communist economic crisis and social hardship in Romania escalated between 1997 and 2000, allowing the populist Greater Romania Party to win around 20% of the popular vote in the 2000 Romanian general election.

The Greater Romania Party managed to unite both nationalist and socialist voters, focusing on the exclusion of the poor from the mainstream society while also decrying the "huge theft" of national assets that had been privatized. This allowed the party to form a large coalition of voters who suffered because of the capitalist transition. This kind of populism was subsequently adopted by most mainstream Romanian parties at the time, which caused the Greater Romania Party to slowly disintegrate, yet leave a permanent mark on the political culture of Romania.

In the 2008 Romanian parliamentary election, the right-wing liberal Democratic Liberal Party emerged victorious. Its government took drastic austerity measures, bringing back the social discontent of the 1990s and causing the voters to turn away from the party. By 2011, riots and protests were organized against the government and its austerity measures, and protesters denounced both the government as well as the mainstream opposition. This became an opportunity for new populist forces to emerge, and Dan Diaconescu's party became one of them.

== History ==
Dan Diaconescu gained name recognition and fame through his television channel OTV and his personal program, Dan Diaconescu Live. Diaconescu started his career in the early 1990s as a local journalist who gradually gained recognition by his revelations of corruption and economic scandals, and in the 2000s he came to own his own channel and TV show. By 2008, his channel became the third most popular channel in Romania, and Diaconescu became known for his creativity and willingness to challenge the social problems of the post-communist Romania. He used a colloquial, slang-like language that was particularly appealing to the poor and groups impoverished by the capitalist transition. Diaconescu's aggressive rhetoric and increasing popularity made him decide to get involved in Romanian politics.

The origins of the party date back to 2010, when Diaconescu was arrested in June 2010 together with his OTV co-worker Doru Pârv. Both men were accused of blackmailing a town mayor with evidence of corruption, and demanding a payment of €200,000 in exchange for staying silent. Diaconescu strongly denied the charge and started believing that it is up to him to stop the corruption and injustice of Romania. Diaconescu then attempted to register a political party under the name "People's Party" in November 2010. While the Court of Bucharest initially approved of the registration, it was legally challenged due to procedural irregularities. By April 2011, Diaconescu changed the party's name to "People's Party - Dan Diaconenscu", but the registration was denied on the basis of the founder's private name and surname being included in the name. However, the party was eventually registered on 19 September 2011.

The party was initially a personalistic party made for the political ambitions of Dan Diaconescu. The party quickly grew in scope and became a left-wing populist party, acting as a voice against the political instability and economic downturn. The party proposed populist and social-oriented policies that would help the poorest and protect disadvantaged social groups from the financial crisis and its effects. The party was greatly critical of other political parties, and particularly attacked austerity policies.

In January 2012, the party congress adopted a formal party structure and composition. Diaconescu did not want to become the president of his own party and instead supported Simona Man for this position, who was the niece of Alexandru Averescu, a famous Romanian general who was a founder of the interwar People's Party. This was done to legitimatize the party; the party also had a position of "first vice-president", but in May 2013 the position was abolished when the party member occupying the office was expelled after conducting secretive negotiations with social democrats.

Diaconescu then formed the program of the party, based on nationalist and socialist policies. He denounced the "theft of the national fortune" that he defined as privatization, protested restructuring of state-owned enterprises, called for the defense of workers' and trade unions' rights, and strongly rejected the austerity measures proposed by the International Monetary Fund, an organization which Diaconescu considered a "foreign intruder". He vigorously campaigned across the country and established many political connections, willing to include even those with vague ideological connections to his program in the party.

The first electoral success of the party came in the 2012 Romanian local elections, when the party managed to win 9% of the votes and reach the third place. This was considered impressive as the local elections in Romania tend to be difficult for newly-formed parties. This victory galvanized support for the party, and its populist appeal became even more attractive to Romanian voters after the failure of the 2012 Romanian presidential impeachment referendum, where 88.7% of the voters voted to impeach the President of Romania Traian Băsescu, yet the referendum failed as it narrowly missed the 50% turnout necessary to make the referendum binding. This undermined the popular trust in the Romanian government and democracy.

This allowed the party to perform well in the 2012 Romanian parliamentary election, where despite existing for less than a year, the party obtained approximately 14.5% of the votes in both Chambers of Parliament, only winning 3% less of the votes than the Liberal-Democratic Party. This was despite the fact that the closed list proportional system was replaced with first-past-the-post single-member districts, which proved fatal to the Greater Romania Party in the 2008 Romanian parliamentary election, despite being a consolidated party by then. The PP-DD came in third again, successfully entering Parliament with 21 senators and 47 deputies. After the election, the party became the fourth largest political force in Romania, after the Social Democrats (PSD), the National Liberals (PNL), and the Democrat Liberals (PDL).

By June 2013 however, the party became heavily affected by party switching, losing 2 senators and 16 deputies, including its group leaders in both chambers.

The PP-DD subsequently merged into the National Union for the Progress of Romania (UNPR) on 29 June 2015.

== Ideology ==
The ideology of the PP-DD expressed nationalist and socialist sentiments. The party supported progressive measures like higher retirement pensions and salaries, and a lower VAT. The party also supported the collectivization of agriculture and the foundation of state companies with directly elected leadership, and sought a People's Tribunal. It is widely considered a left-wing populist and left-wing nationalist party. It was also described as radical left, or as the Romanian equivalent of chavismo.

The PP-DD called its own program "The 100 Points of the New Revolution", and made the socialist, revolutionary language a key element of its electoral message. The party argued that Romanian society could only be saved through a radical change embodied by a revolution, arguing that the post-communist political elites and the state institutions are corrupt and broken beyond repair. The party made vague references to the violent 1989 Romanian Revolution.

Romanian political scientists Andrei Țăranu and Valentin Nicolescu note that the party's approach contained many elements taken "from the communist party", particularly the imagery as well as the attitude towards society. Țăranu and Nicolescu noted that for example, the PP-DD argued that the "country" should belong to the people in terms of collective property, while the "state" is owned by the corrupt and wealthy few; this leads to the situation where the "country" composed of the proletariat is alienated by the "state" led by the bourgeoisie, and must overthrow them. In effect, this made Diaconescu and his party similar to the left-wing populist movements of Latin America. Diaconescu was compared to the Venezuelan socialist leader Hugo Chávez in terms of rhetoric as well as ideology.

The party advocates direct democracy and was often compared to Hugo Chávez and his brand of left-wing populism. The main focus on the party was eradication of poverty in Romania and "the destruction of the corrupt political class". The PP-DD was also neo-communist, though with a strong nationalist element. The party had a strong anti-establishment discourse, calling for lower taxes for the poorest and the restoration of state involvement in the market to socialist-era levels, renationalizing privatized enterprises and greatly limiting market mechanics.

== European affiliation ==
On 21 May 2013, PP-DD publicized their collaboration with the EUDemocrats party.

== Leadership ==
- Dan Diaconescu

== Electoral history ==
=== Legislative elections ===
Election	Chamber			Senate			Position	Aftermath
Election	Votes	%	Seats	Votes	%	Seats	Position	Aftermath
2012	1,036,730	13.99	47 / 412	1,086,822	14.65	21 / 176	3rd	Opposition to USL government (2012–2014)
2012	1,036,730	13.99	47 / 412	1,086,822	14.65	21 / 176	3rd	Opposition to PSD-UNPR-UDMR-PC government (2014)
2012	1,036,730	13.99	47 / 412	1,086,822	14.65	21 / 176	3rd	Opposition to PSD-UNPR-ALDE government (2014–2015)
2012	1,036,730	13.99	47 / 412	1,086,822	14.65	21 / 176	3rd	Supporting the technocratic Cioloș Cabinet (2015–2017)

=== Presidential elections ===
Election	Candidate	First round			Second round		
Election	Candidate	Votes	Percentage	Position	Votes	Percentage	Position
2014	Dan Diaconescu	382,526	4.03%	6th			

=== European elections ===
Election	Votes	Percentage	MEPs	Position	EU Party	EP Group
2014	204,310	3.67%	0 / 32	7th	—	—
