= 2015 Romanian constitutional referendum =

Romanian constitutional referendum, 2015
- Canceled

A constitutional referendum was a contentious polling scheduled to take place in Romania at the end of 2015, but was never held. The Constitution amended by the Social Liberal Union (USL) lawmakers received some criticism, mostly from the opposition Democratic Liberal Party (PDL) backed by outgoing President Traian Băsescu, who expressed his discontent with some articles that reduce the powers he enjoyed while in office and eliminate the President from the executive power system.

The initial date of the referendum was set for 25 May 2014, but the political turmoil blackened the importance of this referendum. The vice-president of the Commission for Constitution Revision, Ioan Chelaru, stated on 5 May 2014, during the Senate leadership meeting, that the most likely date for the referendum is the end of 2015. As of November 2015, the referendum reached a deadlock. The government that proposed the referendum resigned, being replaced by a technocrat cabinet led by Dacian Cioloș.
