= Lavinia Șandru =

Romanian politician, actress and TV host

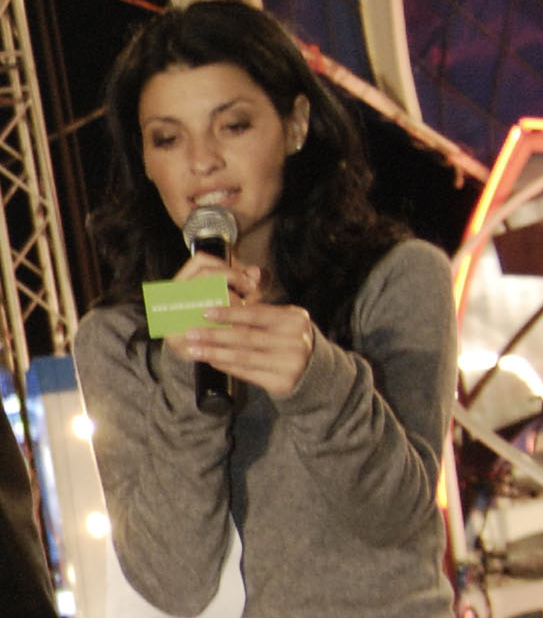
- Șandru in 2009

President of National Initiative Party
- In office 2005–2008

Member of the Chamber of Deputies
- In office 2004–2008

Personal details
- Born: 6 February 1975 (age 51) Dej, Cluj County, Socialist Republic of Romania
- Party: Social Liberal Humanist Party (2020–present)
- Other political affiliations: Democratic Party (2001–2005); National Initiative Party (2005–2008); National Union for the Progress of Romania (2011–2012)
- Spouse: Darius Vâlcov (m. 2005; div. 2015)
- Children: 2
- Education: University of Arts Târgu-Mureș
- Occupation: Journalist; politician

Marcela Lavinia Șandru (born 6 February 1975) is a Romanian politician, journalist and actress. The former president of the National Initiative Party (PIN), she was also vice president of the National Union for the Progress of Romania (UNPR). She was a member of the Romanian Chamber of Deputies for Mureș County from 2004 to 2008.

== Biography ==
She was born in Dej, Cluj County, and attended the University of Arts Târgu-Mureș, graduating in 1997. She interned at the European Parliament's Committee on Culture and Education in 2003, and in 2004 began work on a master's degree at the University of Bucharest's Faculty of Political Sciences. From 2001 to 2004 she headed public relations for Aldaco, a film company, and in 2004 was director of Star Media & Film. Her political career began in 2001–2002, when she was director of public relations for the Democratic Party (PD). In 2002, she headed its international relations department, and in 2004, she became president of the Mureș County PD organisation. She also represented the party at the Party of European Socialists (PES) and the Socialist International.

Șandru won a seat in Parliament at the 2004 legislative election. The following February, when Cozmin Gușă resigned his party post due to a disagreement with the leadership, Șandru did likewise, sitting as an independent for the remainder of the term. Later that year, she became vice president of the National Initiative Party founded by Guşă, a position she held until 2008. She resigned from the PIN in October 2008 in order to run as an independent for a Bucharest seat in the Chamber, as she realised the PIN was not going to win enough seats to enter Parliament. Party members did support her candidacy, but she was defeated.

In February 2009, having rejoined the PIN, she was overwhelmingly elected as its president, following Gușă's resignation from that position. Soon afterwards, she expressed a desire to run in the 2009 European Parliament election on the lists of the Social Democratic Party (PSD), even considering joining the party until after the election. Her possible candidacy as a PIN member on the PSD lists angered a number of senior PSD members as well as the Conservative Party (PC), one of whose allocated spots on the PSD lists Șandru was slated to take. Former Romanian President Ion Iliescu even threatened to resign from the party, and Șandru lost hope of running once a PES directive required member parties' candidates to belong to the respective parties. In December 2011, the PIN merged into the UNPR, whereupon Șandru became the latter party's vice president. Following disagreements with party leader Gabriel Oprea, she quit the UNPR a year later. In February 2013, she began hosting a weekly talk show on Realitatea TV. Five years later, she was suspended without explanation. At the 2024 parliamentary election, while a member of the Social Liberal Humanist Party, she ran for a Sibiu County Senate seat on the lists of the Social Democratic Party.

Șandru once called Iliescu a "communist dinosaur", and referred to the PSD as a "whore party" after it switched its backing from the PNL to the PD in 2007. Șandru has also been known to criticise President Traian Băsescu, for instance accusing him of abuse of power and calling on him to release his Securitate file.

== Personal life and acting ==
In 2005, Șandru married Darius Vâlcov, the mayor of Slatina. The couple have a daughter. In 2015, she announced that they had separated for some time; the couple divorced following Vâlcov's arrest that year. In late 2016, she gave birth to a son.

In 2018, she played a role in Alexandru Davila's Vlaicu-Vodă. At the 2020 Golden Rose Bulgarian Feature Film Festival, she won the best debut prize for her role in Ana. Ana Simion.

In 2017, she voiced a character in Romanian in the animated film Cars 3, also dubbed Gazelle's voice in the animated movie Zootopia.
