= Simona-Alice Man =

Romanian politician

Simona-Alice Man is a Romanian politician and engineer. In 2015 she was the president of the People's Party - Dan Diaconescu (PP-DD) and had also served as a state secretary in the National Tourism Authority. In 2016 she was the Secretary of State for the Ministry of Agriculture and Rural Development.
