= National Initiative Party =

National Initiative Party Partidul Inițiativa Națională
- Abbreviation: PIN
- President: Lavinia Șandru
- Founded: December 2006
- Dissolved: December 2011
- Split from: PD
- Merged into: UNPR
- Headquarters: Calea Victoriei 100, et.1, ap.16 Sector 1 Bucharest
- Ideology: Social democracy Environmentalism; Sovereignism
- Political position: Centre-left
- European affiliation: EUDemocrats
- Colours: Red
- Seats in the Senate: 0 / 136
- Seats in the Chamber: 0 / 330
- Seats in the European Parliament: 0 / 33

Website
- www.nip.ro

The National Initiative Party (Romanian: Partidul Inițiativa Națională, PIN) was a small social democratic Romanian political party. It emerged after three Democratic Party (PD) MCDs were expelled form the party a few days after the Justice and Truth Alliance (DA) narrowly won the 2004 legislative election. The three members are: Cosmin Gușă, Lavinia Șandru, and Aurelian Pavelescu. In 2011, the party changed its name to the National Initiative Party - Ecologist (Romanian: Partidul Inițiativa Națională - Ecologist, Eco-PIN) in order to highlight the party's ideology. The party merged into UNPR in December 2011.

Its founding members were political analyst (Cosmin Gușă), member of UNPR (Lavinia Șandru), and had a dispute over the PNȚCD leadership (currently still held by Aurelian Pavelescu).

== Electoral history ==
=== European elections ===
Election	Votes	Percentage	MEPs	Position	EU Party	EP Group
2007	124,829	2.43%	0 / 35	10th	EUD	—
2009	did not compete				EUD	—
