= Social Liberal Union =

Political coalition in Romania

Social Liberal Union Uniunea Social Liberală
- Coalition co-Presidents: Victor Ponta; Crin Antonescu
- Party Presidents: Victor Ponta (PSD); Crin Antonescu (PNL); Daniel Constantin (PC); Gabriel Oprea (UNPR)
- Founded: 5 February 2011
- Dissolved: 25 February 2014
- Succeeded by: Social Democratic Union (claimed, not legal successor)
- Headquarters: Șoseaua Kiseleff nr. 57; 011344 Bucharest
- Ideology: Big tent
- Political position: Centre-left
- Colours: Red Yellow; Blue
- Senate^{[a]}: 135 / 171
- Chamber of Deputies^{[a]}: 289 / 404
- County Council Presidents^{[b]}: 37 / 41
- County Councils^{[b]}: 728 / 1,338
- Mayors^{[c]}: 1,969 / 3,121
- Local Councils^{[c]}: 20,420 / 39,121

Website
- https://web.archive.org/web/20120823103117/http://uslonline.ro/
- Politics of Romania; Political parties; Elections; Seats obtained at the 2012 election Seats obtained at the 2012 election Seats computed by adding all the seats obtained at the 2012 election by the Union and the constituent parties at the time of the election

The Social Liberal Union (Romanian: Uniunea Social Liberală, USL) was a grand coalition of several political parties which was active in Romania during the early to mid 2010s. The alliance contained two major political parties, one major centre-left and one centre-right, more specifically the Social Democratic Party (PSD) and the National Liberal Party (PNL), respectively.

== History ==
=== Formation ===
The USL was formed on 5 February 2011 initially between the Social Democratic Party (PSD), and the Centre Right Alliance (ACD) of National Liberal Party (PNL) and the Conservative Party (PC).

=== 2012 elections ===
In June 2012, the USL won the local elections by a landslide. After the elections, in September, the National Union for the Progress of Romania (UNPR), originally a breakaway from PSD and PNL, together with the PSD formed the Centre Left Alliance (ACS) and entered the USL.

At the parliamentary elections in December, the four-party coalition won about two thirds of the seats in both the Senate and the Chamber of Deputies.

=== Dissolution ===
After the Centre Right Alliance (ACD) of PNL and PC dissolved in November 2013, the PC turned leftwards and aligned more with PSD and UNPR. As a result, the centre-right National Liberal Party (PNL) broke up the coalition on 25 February 2014 and entered opposition.

In the 2014 presidential election, PSD, UNPR, and PC would designate Victor Ponta as their united candidate, while the PNL formed a new Christian Liberal Alliance (ACL) with the Democratic Liberal Party (PDL), supporting Klaus Iohannis.

== Members ==
Party	Abbr.	Leader	Ideology
Social Democratic Party	PSD	Victor Ponta	Social democracy Social conservatism Christian left
National Liberal Party	PNL	Crin Antonescu	Liberal conservatism Christian democracy Social conservatism
Conservative Party	PC	Daniel Constantin	Social conservatism National conservatism Humanism
National Union for the Progress of Romania	UNPR	Gabriel Oprea	Social democracy Social liberalism Progressivism
Green Party (until 2013)	PV	Remus Cernea	Green politics Green conservatism Anti-corruption

== Electoral history ==
=== Legislative elections ===
Election	Chamber			Senate			Position	Aftermath
Election	Votes	%	Seats	Votes	%	Seats	Position	Aftermath
2008	did not exist^{1}		144 / 334	did not exist^{1}		79 / 137	–	Opposition to PDL-UNPR-UDMR government (2011–2012)
2008	did not exist^{1}		144 / 334	did not exist^{1}		79 / 137	–	USL government (2012)
2012	4,344,288	58.63	273 / 412	4,457,526	60.10	122 / 176	1st ^{2}	USL government (2012–2014)
2012	4,344,288	58.63	273 / 412	4,457,526	60.10	122 / 176	1st ^{2}	Alliance dismantled in March 2014; PSD-UNPR-UDMR-PC government (2014); PNL in opposition
2012	4,344,288	58.63	273 / 412	4,457,526	60.10	122 / 176	1st ^{2}	PSD-UNPR-ALDE^{3} government (2014–2015); PNL in opposition
2012	4,344,288	58.63	273 / 412	4,457,526	60.10	122 / 176	1st ^{2}	Supporting the technocratic Cioloș Cabinet (2015–2017)

Notes

^{1} At the time of the formation (more specifically in February 2011) there were 144 Deputies (89 from PSD, 52 from PNL, and 3 from PC) and 92 Senators (53 from PSD and 39 from PNL)

^{2} USL was an alliance comprising two smaller alliances as follows: the Centre Left Alliance (ACS) and the Centre Right Alliance (ACD). The members of the Centre Left Alliance (ACS) were PSD (58 senators and 149 deputies) and UNPR (5 senators and 10 deputies). The members of the Centre Right Alliance (ACD) were: PNL (50 senators and 100 deputies) and PC (8 senators and 13 deputies).

^{3} ALDE was created in June 2015 from a merger of PLR (a splinter of PNL) and PC.

=== Local elections ===
==== National elections ====
Year	County councilors			Mayors			Local councilors			Popular vote	%	Position
Year	Votes	%	Seats	Votes	%	Seats	Votes	%	Seats	Popular vote	%	Position
2012^{1}	4,203,007	49.68	723 / 1,338	2,782,792	33.99	1,292 / 3,121	2,630,123	32.74	12,668 / 39,121	—N/a	—N/a	1st

Year	County presidents			Position
Year	Votes	%	Seats	Position
2012^{1}	4,260,709	49.71	36 / 41	1st

Notes

^{1} Seats won independently by member parties of the alliance are not shown here.

==== Mayor of Bucharest ====
Year	Candidate	First round		
Year	Candidate	Votes	Percentage	Position
2012	Sorin Oprescu^{1}	430,512	53.79%	1st

Notes

^{1} Independent candidate endorsed by USL

== See also ==
- National Coalition for Romania (CNR), a similar political alliance active between 2021 and 2025
- Romania Forward Electoral Alliance (A.RO), a similar political alliance active since 2025
- Grand coalition
- PSD–PNL Alliance
