= PSD–UNPR–ALDE Alliance =

PSD–UNPR–ALDE Alliance Alianța PSD–UNPR–ALDE
- Founded: 10 February 2014
- Dissolved: August 2019
- Preceded by: Social Liberal Union (claimed, not legal successor)
- Slogan: USL lives ! (Romanian: USL trăiește !); Proud to be Romanians ! (Romanian: Mândri că suntem români !)

Party flag

The PSD–UNPR–ALDE Alliance was a political alliance in Romania. It was initially established on 10 February 2014 as the Social Democratic Union between the Social Democratic Party (PSD), the National Union for the Progress of Romania (UNPR) and the Conservative Party (PC). However, the name was rejected by the Permanent Electoral Bureau, because an alliance with an identical name existed in 1996, and the Democratic Liberal Party, that owned the copyright for the name, refused to grant it to the PSD. On 7 March 2014, the PSD–UNPR–PC Alliance was registered.

At the 2014 European Parliament election in Romania, the alliance won 37.60% of the votes, coming first. It won 16 MEPs, 2 being from PC, 2 from UNPR and 12 from PSD.

On 19 June 2015, PC merged with the Liberal Reformist Party to form the Alliance of Liberals and Democrats (ALDE). ALDE joined the alliance, thus forming the PSD–UNPR–ALDE Alliance.

After the dismissal of the Fourth Ponta Cabinet on 17 November 2015, UNPR left the alliance and, on 12 July 2016, it merged into the People's Movement Party.

After the 2016 Romanian parliamentary election, PSD and ALDE formed 3 successive coalition governments. ALDE withdrew from the Dăncilă Cabinet in August 2019, thereby marking the end of the alliance.

== Composition ==
Party	Abbr.	Ideology	From	To
Social Democratic Party	PSD	Social democracy Christian left	2014	2019
National Union for the Progress of Romania	UNPR	Social democracy Progressivism	2014	2015
Conservative Party	PC	Conservatism; Humanism	2014	2015
Alliance of Liberals and Democrats	ALDE	Liberalism; Conservative liberalism	2015	2019

== See also ==
- Social Democratic Union (Romania)
