= Social Protection People's Party =

Social Protection People's Party Partidul Popular și al Protecției Sociale
- President: Nicolae Popescu (2011)
- Founded: December 22, 1994 (as Party of Pensioners and Social Protection)
- Dissolved: December 2, 2011
- Merged into: National Union for the Progress of Romania
- Ideology: Social liberalism Pensioners' interests
- Political position: Center-left

The Social Protection People's Party (Romanian: Partidul Popular și al Protecției Sociale), initially known as the Party of Pensioners and Social Protection (Romanian: Partidul Pensionarilor și al Protecției Sociale), was a minor center-left political party in Romania, claiming to represent the interests of pensioners, the unemployed, and other vulnerable social classes. It merged into the National Union for the Progress of Romania in December 2011.
