= Cozmin Gușă =

Romanian physicist, journalist and politician

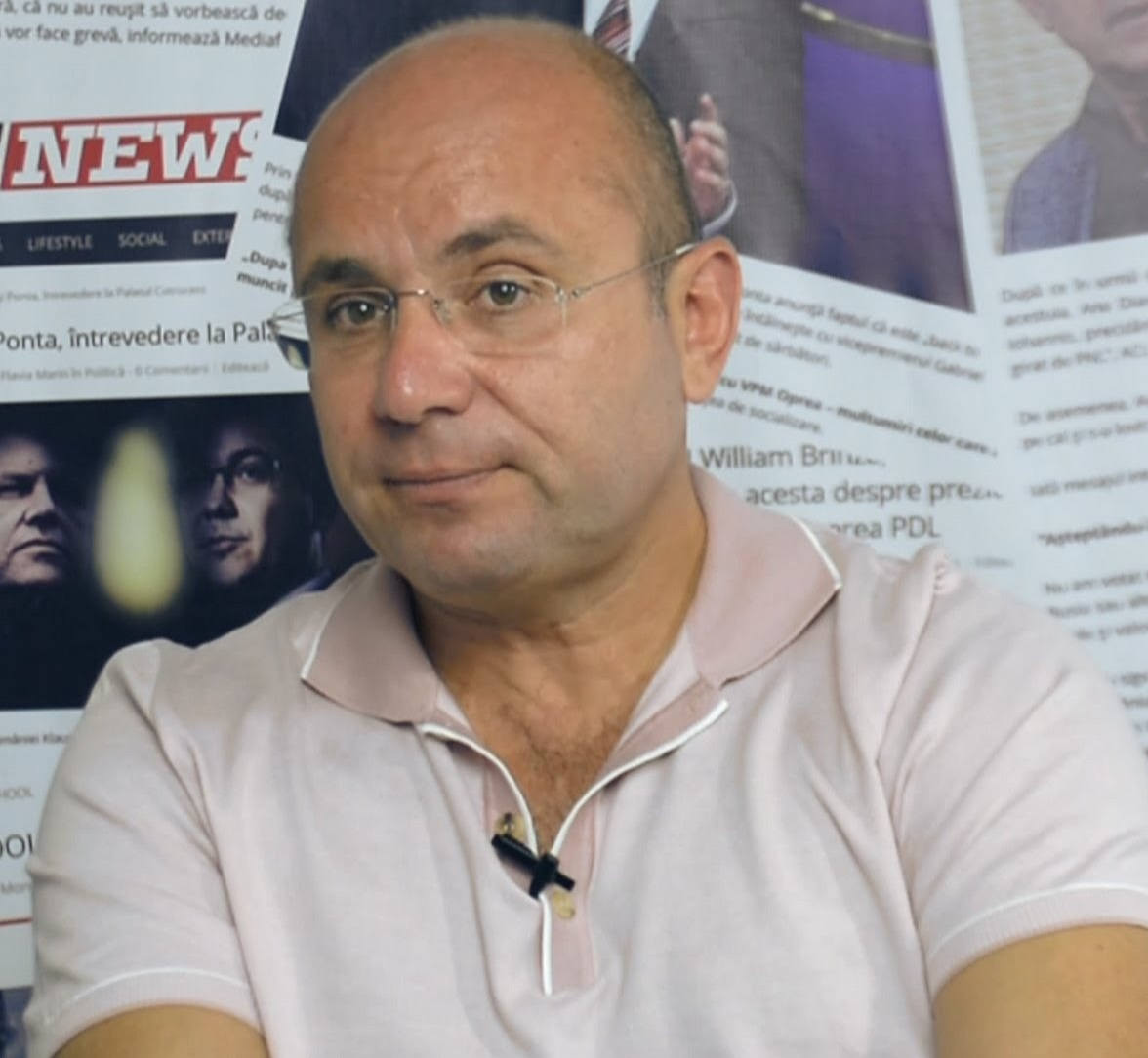
- Cozmin Gușă in 2016

President of the National Initiative Party
- In office 2006–2009
- Succeeded by: Lavinia Șandru

Member of the Chamber of Deputies
- In office 2004–2008

Member of the National Permanent Bureau of the Democratic Party
- In office 2004–2005

General secretary of the Social Democratic Party
- In office 16 June 2001 – 7 July 2003

General secretary of the Social Democracy Party of Romania
- In office December 2000 – 16 June 2001

Personal details
- Born: 2 July 1970 (age 56) Câmpia Turzii, Cluj County, Socialist Republic of Romania
- Party: Independent politician (2003–2004, 2011–2019, 2019–present)
- Other political affiliations: Social Democracy Party of Romania (2000–2001); Social Democratic Party (2001–2003, 2019); Democratic Party (2004–2005); National Initiative Party (2006–2011)
- Education: Babeș-Bolyai University; Bucharest Academy of Economic Studies
- Profession: Physicist

Cozmin Horea Gușă (born 2 July 1970) is a Romanian physicist, journalist, and politician. A member of the National Initiative Party (PIN), he was a member of the Romanian Chamber of Deputies for Bucharest from 2004 to 2008.

He has been married since 1994 and has a son and a daughter.

== Biography ==
He was born in Câmpia Turzii and attended the Physics faculty of Babeș-Bolyai University from 1989 to 1994. He also took classes in mass-media management in the United States (1997–1998) and a class in international economic negotiation at the École nationale d'administration in France (2002). He holds a 2006 doctorate in Management from the Bucharest Academy of Economic Studies, and since 2007 has been working on a doctorate in Geopolitics at the University of Bucharest. From 1994 to 1996, he headed a national press wholesaler, followed by a stint (1996–1997) as head of the editorial division at Radio Sonic in Cluj-Napoca. From 1997 to 1998, he headed the newspaper Știrea, holding a similar position from 1998 to 2001 at the Jurnalul Național, also working during that time at Antena 1. From 2001 to 2003, he was president of the Association for the Promotion of Young People.

Gușă's political career began in 2001, when he became secretary general of the Social Democratic Party (PSD); until 2003, he was thought of as the right-hand man of then-party leader and Prime Minister Adrian Năstase. That year, he resigned from the party, citing differences in vision with members of an older generation such as Viorel Hrebenciuc, Octav Cozmâncă, and Miron Mitrea. Later in 2003, he went on to found Inițiativa 2003, a non-partisan, non-governmental organisation; he remained its president until 2008.

Following an agreement between his group and the Democratic Party (PD), Gușă entered the PD and served on its permanent bureau. While the situation was awkward at first, with Gușă accustomed to attack PD leader Traian Băsescu while a PSD member, Băsescu selected Gușă as his campaign director for the 2004 presidential election. A victorious Băsescu regarded Gușă as responsible for his win, who himself entered Parliament at the concurrent legislative election. He remained in charge of the PD's campaigns into 2005.

In early 2005, Gușă was elected head of the PD group in the Chamber of Deputies, but the party leadership invalidated the vote on a technicality. Some party leaders accused him of trying to take over the leadership. Soon afterwards, Gușă, together with two other deputies, resigned from the PD leadership and founded the National Initiative Party (PIN); he sat as an independent for the remainder of his term. The party failed to win any seats at the 2007 European Parliament election, prompting Gușă to resign from the leadership, but he was soon re-elected party president. He ran for Mayor of Bucharest in June 2008, coming in fifth place with 5.76% of the vote. His party did not run candidates at the 2008 legislative election later that year, knowing it did not have a realistic chance of winning, and Gușă declined an invitation to run from the Cluj County PSD, preferring to focus on business. In January 2009, he announced his "temporary" withdrawal from political life, with Lavinia Șandru succeeding him as head of the PIN.

Gușă has been a critic of Romanian President Ion Iliescu, toward whom Jurnalul Național had an "extremely virulent attitude" while Gușă was there (in turn, in March 2009, Iliescu threatened to resign from the PSD if party leader Mircea Geoană took on Gușă, whom he labelled an "interloper" and a "mercenary", as an adviser) and, once they broke with each other, of Traian Băsescu, whom he called a "hypocrite" who "mocks the Constitution" months after the split, and whom he accused of wishing to dismantle the National Anticorruption Directorate once Geoană went ahead and named him an adviser on campaign strategy for Transylvania. Gușă has himself held presidential ambitions, announcing he would run in the event the 2007 referendum to impeach Băsescu (which he backed, citing "serious constitutional violations" by the President) had succeeded. In part, he wished to block the rise of Gigi Becali, who had already declared he would run.
