= Centre Right Alliance =

Centre Right Alliance Alianţa de Centru Dreapta
- President: Crin Antonescu; Daniel Constantin
- Leader in the Senate: Mario Oprea
- Leader in the Chamber of Deputies: Călin Popescu-Tăriceanu
- Founder: Crin Antonescu; Daniel Constantin
- Founded: January 2011
- Dissolved: November 2013 (de facto)
- Headquarters: Bd. Aviatorilor nr. 86; 011866 Bucharest
- Ideology: Liberalism, Conservative liberalism
- Political position: Centre-right
- Constituent parties: National Liberal Party, Conservative Party
- Colors: Yellow
- Senate: 27 / 137
- Chamber of Deputies: 59 / 334
- European Parliament: 5 / 33
- County Council Presidents: 14 / 41
- County Councils: 297 / 1,393
- Mayors: 706 / 3,179
- Local Councils: 8,529 / 40,297

The Centre Right Alliance (Romanian: Alianţa de Centru Dreapta, ACD) was a centre-right political alliance between 2011 and 2013.

== History ==
=== Formation ===
The alliance was founded in January 2011 by the National Liberal Party (PNL) and the Conservative Party (PC), when the PC moved away from its longstanding affiliation with the Social Democratic Party (PSD) breaking up the center-left Alliance PSD+PC. The protocol of the alliance however did not include the seat held by the Conservative Party in the European Parliament, as the MEP remained committed to the S&D Group.

The alliance drew its inspiration for branding and electoral representation from the National Liberal Party (PNL), incorporating their colors and electoral signage. Moreover, to fortify its identity, the alliance strategically amalgamated elements from the Conservative Party (PC) by integrating its acronym into the coalition's logo. This deliberate fusion aimed to project a unified and strengthened front, leveraging the established symbols and recognition associated with both political entities. Such a collaborative branding initiative sought to resonate with a broader spectrum of voters while reinforcing the distinctive values and principles each party represented within the alliance.

=== Part of the Social Liberal Union (USL) ===
In 2011, the alliance was part of the Social Liberal Union (USL) together with the Social Democratic Party (PSD) and, since September 2012, the National Union for the Progress of Romania (UNPR), the latter two parts of the Centre-Left Alliance (ACS).

=== Dissolution ===
As of November 2013, the ACD no longer functions as the constituent parties consensually decided to de facto break their respective union citing technical irregularities in the territorial organizations and opposing stands of both party leaders regarding current governmental and political affairs. However, PNL and PC remain part of the larger USL alliance, together with the ACS member parties, PSD and UNPR.

== Electoral history ==
=== Legislative elections ===
| Election | Chamber | | | Senate | | | Position | Aftermath |
| Election | Votes | % | Seats | Votes | % | Seats | Position | Aftermath |
|---|---|---|---|---|---|---|---|---|
| 2012 | 4,344,288 | 58.63 | 114 / 412 | 4,457,526 | 60.10 | 59 / 176 | 1st (within USL)^{1st} | USL government (2012–2014) |
| 2012 | 4,344,288 | 58.63 | 114 / 412 | 4,457,526 | 60.10 | 59 / 176 | 1st (within USL)^{1st} | PSD-UNPR-UDMR-PC government (2014); PNL in opposition |
| 2012 | 4,344,288 | 58.63 | 114 / 412 | 4,457,526 | 60.10 | 59 / 176 | 1st (within USL)^{1st} | PSD-UNPR-ALDE^{2} government (2014–2015); PNL in opposition |
| 2012 | 4,344,288 | 58.63 | 114 / 412 | 4,457,526 | 60.10 | 59 / 176 | 1st (within USL)^{1st} | Supporting the technocratic Cioloș Cabinet (2015–2017) |

Notes:

^{1} USL was an alliance of two smaller alliances: Centre Left Alliance (ACS) and Centre Right Alliance (ACD). Centre Left Alliance (ACS) members: PSD (58 senators and 149 deputies) and UNPR (5 senators and 10 deputies). Centre Right Alliance members: PNL (51 senators and 101 deputies) and PC (8 senators and 13 deputies).
^{2} ALDE was created in June 2015 from a merger of PLR (a splinter of PNL) and PC.
