= Gabriel Oprea =

Romanian politician

Gabriel Oprea KSR
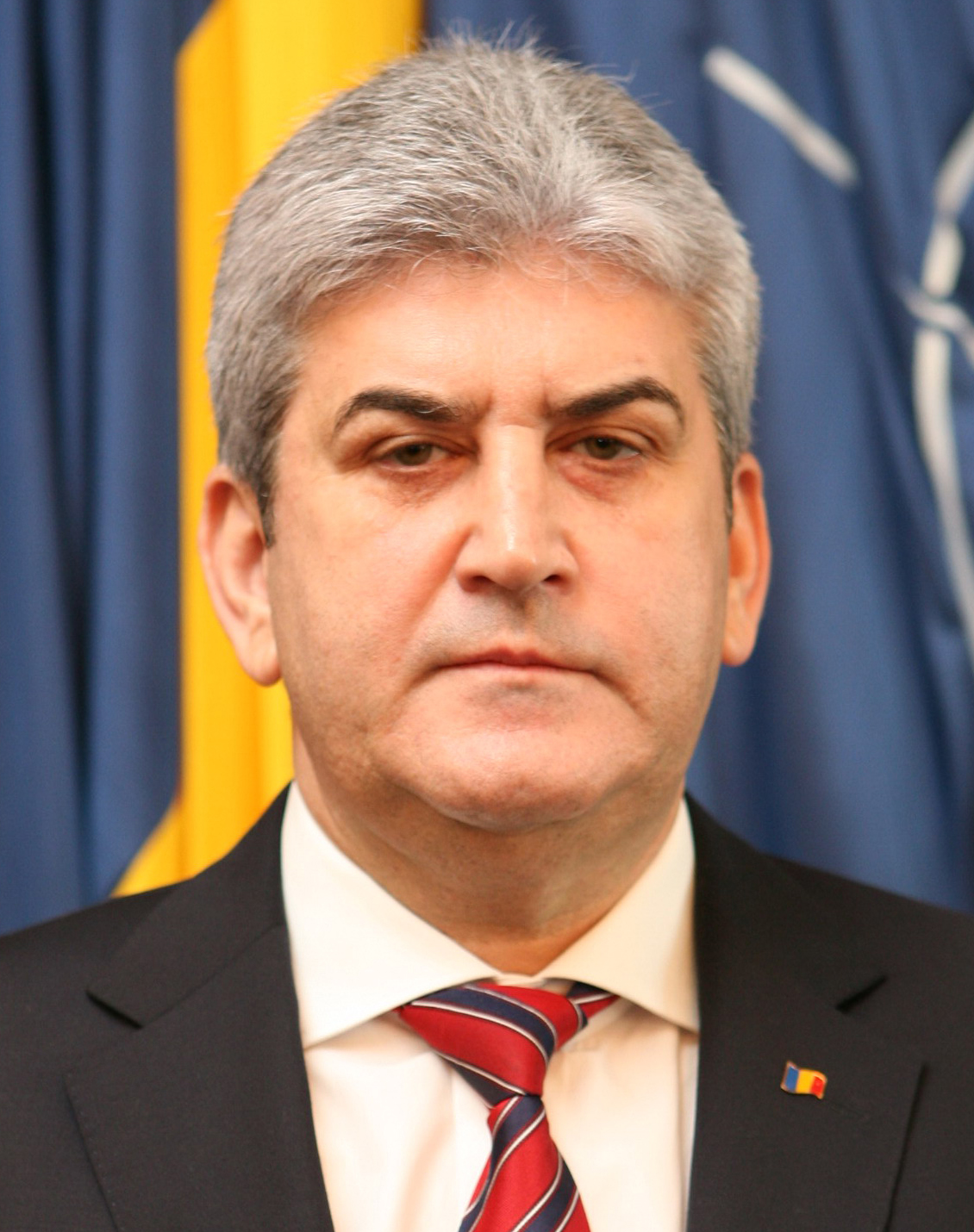
- Oprea in 2011

Prime Minister of Romania Acting
- In office 29 July 2015 – 10 August 2015
- President: Klaus Iohannis
- Preceded by: Victor Ponta
- Succeeded by: Victor Ponta
- In office 22 June 2015 – 9 July 2015
- President: Klaus Iohannis
- Preceded by: Victor Ponta
- Succeeded by: Victor Ponta

Minister of Internal Affairs
- In office 5 March 2014 – 9 November 2015; Acting: 23 January 2014 – 5 March 2014
- Prime Minister: Victor Ponta
- Preceded by: Radu Stroe
- Succeeded by: Petre Tobă
- In office 22 December 2008 – 13 January 2009
- Prime Minister: Emil Boc
- Preceded by: Cristian David
- Succeeded by: Dan Nica (Acting)

Deputy Prime Minister of Romania
- In office 21 December 2012 – 9 November 2015
- Prime Minister: Victor Ponta; Sorin Cîmpeanu (Acting)
- Preceded by: Florin Georgescu
- Succeeded by: Vasile Dîncu; Costin Borc

Minister of National Defence
- In office 23 December 2009 – 7 May 2012
- Prime Minister: Emil Boc; Cătălin Predoiu (Acting); Mihai Răzvan Ungureanu
- Preceded by: Mihai Stănișoară
- Succeeded by: Corneliu Dobrițoiu

Personal details
- Born: 1 January 1961 (age 65) Fundulea, Călărași County, Romania
- Party: Independent
- Other political affiliations: National Union for the Progress of Romania (2010–2016); Social Democratic Party (2003–2009)
- Spouse: Sanda Oprea
- Children: 2
- Education: Nicolae Bălcescu Land Forces Academy; University of Bucharest; Carol I National Defence University

Military service
- Years of service: 1983–2003
- Rank: General

Gabriel Oprea (Note: Romanian pronunciation: [ɡabriˈel ˈopre̯a]) KSR (born 1 January 1961) is a Romanian politician and a general in the army reserves. The former president of the National Union for the Progress of Romania (UNPR) and a former member of the Social Democratic Party (PSD) who is now an independent, he was a member of the Romanian Chamber of Deputies for Ilfov County from 2004 to 2012 and was a Senator for Bucharest from 2012 to 2016.

In the Adrian Năstase cabinet, he was Minister-Delegate for Public Administration from June 2003 to July 2004; in the Emil Boc cabinet, he was Minister of Administration and Interior from December 2008 to January 2009; again under Boc and continuing under Mihai Răzvan Ungureanu, he was Defence Minister (December 2009–May 2012); and in the Victor Ponta cabinet, served as deputy Prime Minister from December 2012, additionally holding the Interior portfolio from January 2014. From June to July 2015, and again from late July into August, he was interim Prime Minister of Romania. That November, he left the government after Ponta's resignation.

== Biography ==
=== Early life and military career ===
He was born in Fundulea, Călărași County and in 1980 entered the Active Officers' Military School in Sibiu, graduating as an officer in 1983. Following Law studies at the University of Bucharest from 1985 to 1990, he qualified as a lawyer, in 2000 obtaining a Law doctorate from the same institution. He also finished a course in national security at the Carol I National Defence University in 1997. In 2001, he was a professor at the latter school; he served as thesis adviser at the Alexandru Ioan Cuza Police Academy in 2002 and has been both professor and thesis adviser at the National Academy of Intelligence since 2008. He has also authored and co-authored a number of books and chapters since 2001. He and his wife Sanda have a daughter and a son.

In 2015, an allegation of plagiarism was lodged against Oprea with regard to his thesis; he responded that the source of the complaint was an individual he had fired and who was pursuing a vendetta. A national ethics council unanimously found no evidence of plagiarism. Meanwhile, the head of Bucharest University's ethics committee, speaking in a personal capacity, charged that dozens of pages from the thesis were indeed plagiarized. Oprea's party responded by accusing him of defamation and threatening a lawsuit. Additionally, journalists asserted that three doctoral theses supervised by Oprea were themselves affected by plagiarism. A 2023 ruling by the High Court of Cassation and Justice annulled the order withdrawing his title of PhD, prompting Oprea to claim he had been cleared of plagiarism.

Oprea served in the Romanian Land Forces from 1983 to 1990, and in 1990 worked in the military law. In 2000, Oprea was made a knight of the Order of the Star of Romania, and the following year attained the same rank in the National Order for Faithful Service. He reached the rank of three-start lieutenant general in the reserves in 2008. In October 2009, President Traian Băsescu granted him the rank of four-star general, possibly in exchange for Oprea's support of Băsescu's bid for re-election. From 2000 to 2001, he was adjunct director of the National Defence University. From 2001 to 2002, he was a secretary of state at the National State Reserves Administration, and from 2002 to 2003, he was Prefect of Bucharest.

=== Political beginnings and first cabinet post ===
In 2003, Oprea joined the PSD, and aside from serving in the Năstase government, he became president of the party's Ilfov County branch in 2004 and of its defence policy department in 2006. He was also part of its national coordinating bureau in 2004–2005. At the 2004 election, he won a seat in the Chamber, where he served on the joint parliamentary committee providing oversight to the activities of Serviciul Român de Informaţii (SRI) and worked mainly on legislation affecting that agency. Re-elected in 2008, he was soon named to the Administration and Interior portfolio. At the time, his wealth drew some attention; in 2008, he had bank accounts worth over €1 million, three houses and two apartments in and around Bucharest, and a Mercedes-Benz.

Oprea announced his priorities as minister to be security for citizens, in particular the maintenance of order in large cities; decentralisation combined with a strengthening of local institutions; and for Romania to join the Schengen Area by 2011. However, he quickly ran into political difficulties when a scandal erupted within the party regarding the state secretaries and departmental directors Oprea had named to posts within the ministry; particularly controversial was the appointment of Virgil Ardelean to head the General Directorate for Internal Information and Protection. Oprea was attacked by his rival for the ministerial post, Liviu Dragnea; by former President Ion Iliescu and his allies, whose own candidate Oprea had defeated; and eventually by party leader Mircea Geoană, who charged Oprea with acting unilaterally and outside party discipline by making the appointments without consulting him. However, some defended Oprea, saying he had acted within his legal prerogatives and that it was not Ardelean and the other appointees they objected to, but the fact that they could not place their own supporters in the positions Oprea filled. The affair caused some tension in the coalition government as well: Prime Minister Emil Boc of the PD-L signed Oprea's appointments also without consulting Geoană.

Following several days of scandal and with no sign of support from President Traian Băsescu, Oprea resigned his post after three weeks on the job, claiming he had acted "properly and legally" but that the appointments had "disturbed certain people" and he was unwilling to be a "puppet minister". Shortly afterwards, following the party leadership's withdrawal of its political support for Oprea as minister, he resigned as Ilfov County party chairman, and then left the party itself (and the defence policy department presidency) after the leadership initiated moves to expel him, saying he did not wish to subject county party members (most of whom he believed would have continued to stand by him) to "pressures from headquarters". A month later, in February 2009, with Oprea now sitting as an independent, the Chamber unanimously voted to approve him as a member of the defence committee.

=== UNPR leadership and later ministerial assignments ===
Joining the new National Union for the Progress of Romania (UNPR), he was elected its executive president in May 2010. Meanwhile, he returned to the Boc cabinet in late 2009, as Defence Minister. As such, he drew controversy for using a ministerial helicopter to fly to and from party events. He served until May 2012, including, during the last phase, under Mihai Răzvan Ungureanu. At that point, incoming prime minister Victor Ponta, despite having criticized UNPR members as "traitors" and "undercover officers", reached an agreement with Oprea, who provided parliamentary support to the new government. That December, he was elected to the Senate, and subsequently became deputy prime minister.

In January 2014, following the resignation of Radu Stroe, Oprea returned as Interior Minister on an interim basis, and on a permanent one after Ponta formed a new government in March. In June 2015, with Ponta out of the country for knee surgery, Oprea became interim prime minister, serving until Ponta returned early the following month. When Ponta took another leave of absence at the end of July, Oprea again took over as acting prime minister, serving until early August. In October, he faced calls to resign after a police officer suffered a fatal motorcycle accident while escorting Oprea's motorcade. Shortly after Ponta's resignation in November 2015, Oprea too quit the government.

In March 2016, the National Anticorruption Directorate (DNA) opened two cases of abuse of office against Oprea: one for illegally using a motorcade, and one for purchasing a limousine using government funds. As a result, Oprea promptly resigned as UNPR president. In early July, he quit the UNPR, announcing he would sit as an independent until the autumn election, when he would leave politics altogether. In September, the Senate voted to deny the DNA request to prosecute Oprea for manslaughter in the motorcade case. This move sparked a protest before the Senate building that drew some 3000 individuals, prompting Oprea to announce his resignation and remove any shield of parliamentary immunity. Oprea ran as an independent for a Chamber seat at the 2020 election; his 796 votes were well below what was needed for victory. In July 2023, the Bucharest Appeals Court delivered a final verdict acquitting Oprea of the motorcade charge.

== Notes ==
Political offices
Preceded by Mihai Stănișoară	Minister of National Defence; 2009–2012	Succeeded by Corneliu Dobrițoiu
Preceded by Radu Stroe	Minister of Internal Affairs; 2014–2015	Succeeded by Ilie Botoș
Preceded by Victor Ponta	Prime Minister of Romania; Acting; 2015	Succeeded by Victor Ponta
