= Party for the Homeland, Military and Police =

Party for the Homeland, Military and Police in Reserve and Retirement Partidul pentru Patrie, Militari și Polițiști în Rezervă și Retragere
- Abbreviation: PPMPRR
- President: Gabriel Oprea
- Founded: March 2010
- Merger of: PPPS (2011); PIN (2011); PP-DD (2015)
- Split from: PSD and PNL (2010); PMP (2018)
- Headquarters: Bucharest
- Youth wing: UNPR's Youth
- Membership (2013): 350,000
- Ideology: Social democracy Social liberalism Progressivism; Militarism; Pro-Europeanism
- Political position: Centre-left
- National affiliation: USL (2012–14); ACS (2012–14); USD (2014–15)
- Regional affiliation: Coalition for Baia Mare (2016)
- Colours: Red
- Slogan: Dumnezeu, Patrie, Familie, Onoare (lit. 'God, Homeland, Family, Honour')
- Senate: 0 / 136
- Chamber of Deputies: 0 / 330
- European Parliament: 0 / 33
- County Council Presidents: 0 / 41
- County Councillors: 0 / 1,340
- Mayors: 0 / 3,176

Website
- noulunpr.ro

The Party for the Homeland, Military and Police in Reserve and Retirement (Romanian: Partidul pentru Patrie, Militari și Polițiști în Rezervă și Retragere, PPMPRR), sometimes shortened to the Party for the Homeland, Military and Police (Romanian: Partidul pentru Patrie, Militari și Polițiști, PPMP), and formerly known as the National Union for the Progress of Romania (Romanian: Uniunea Națională pentru Progresul României, UNPR) is a political party in Romania. The party was formed in March 2010 as UNPR by independents who had broken away from the Social Democratic Party (PSD) and the National Liberal Party (PNL) to support President Traian Băsescu. Tension began soon after the party's formation between former PSD and PNL members over the distribution of leadership positions and the political direction of the new party, with former PSD members dominating. The first party congress to elect its leaders was on 1 May 2010.

On 12 July 2016, former President Traian Băsescu announced that UNPR would merge with his People's Movement Party (PMP) on 20 July 2016, but the process failed and Gabriel Oprea reorganised the party in June 2018. At the PMP congress in March 2021, PMP members formally denounced and dissolved their former union with UNPR.

In March 2025, the party changed its name from the National Union for the Progress of Romania to the Party for the Homeland, Military and Police.

== History ==
UNPR party logo

In 2009, parliamentarians from PSD, PNL, and other parliamentary organizations left their political parties to support President Traian Băsescu. Thus, they formed the parliamentary group of independents, led by former senator Gabriel Oprea. Afterwards, Oprea was named Minister of Administration and Interior.

In 2010, the majority of the group formed UNPR. On 1 May 2010, the new party elected its leaders, by means of congress. Allied with the PDL and UDMR, the UNPR participated in government until 2012. At the first party congress held in May 2010, Marian Sârbu was elected president. In 2011, the National Initiative Party (PIN) merged into the Union. PIN's president, Lavinia Șandru, became UNPR's vice-president but later resigned from the party citing its lack of support for her ecologist policies.

In 2012, the government led by independent Mihai Răzvan Ungureanu was dismissed by a motion of no confidence and, as such, the UNPR entered parliamentary opposition. On 28 May 2012, Sârbu stepped down as party leader. Following Sârbu's resignation, Gabriel Oprea was elected UNPR president. UNPR later formed with PSD, the Centre Left Alliance (ACS) which was included in the Social Liberal Union (USL).

Cristian Diaconescu, a founding member of UNPR, honorary president, and former Minister of External Affairs, resigned from the union after the party changed sides and entered the Social Liberal Union (USL). He is an independent politician with close ties to the right-wing conservative former President of Romania, Traian Băsescu, who appointed him as leader of the Presidential Chancellery in March 2012.

In the Romanian Parliamentary elections of December 2012, the UNPR won in alliance (i.e. USL) with the PSD, PNL, and PC, 10 seats in the Chamber of Deputies and 5 in the Senate. Because the party lacked the necessary number of seats to form a distinct parliamentary group (12 deputies and 7 senators respectively), their parliamentarians joined the group of the Social Democratic Party (PSD). They voted for the government led by former PSD Prime Minister Victor Ponta. Oprea served as Deputy Prime Minister of Romania between 2012 and 2015.

On 29 June 2015, the party absorbed the People's Party – Dan Diaconescu (PP-DD) in aftermath of Diaconescu's conviction of extortion.

On 12 July 2016, former President Traian Băsescu announced that UNPR would merge with his People's Movement Party (PMP) on 20 July 2016, but the process failed and Gabriel Oprea reorganised the party in June 2018. At the PMP congress in March 2021, PMP members formally denounced and dissolved their former union with UNPR.

On 16 December 2023, Gabriel Oprea was re-elected as the president of the party.

On 4 March 2025, the party changed its name from the National Union for the Progress of Romania to the Party for the Homeland, Military and Police, and on 12 March it announced its support for Victor Ponta in the 2025 presidential election.

== Doctrine ==
UNPR's doctrine is social-democratic with shades of progressivism. The union is against right-wing politics policies, both conservative and neo-conservative. The union's self reported doctrine is "progressive left-wing" with a social-democratic orientation. UNPR believes in a new political and economic order, based on consolidation of the market economy within an "active state" that protects citizens and human rights. UNPR strongly supports a significant wealth tax and fair progressive taxation. UNPR's platform also includes support for the decentralization of Romania and the introduction of mandatory military service for all Romanian citizens aged 18 to 35.

As PPMP, the party mainly advocates for the interests of members of the military and police, active, in reserves, and retired alike.

== Structure ==
The president acts as the union's governing body; he represents the party in political conversations and parliament. The president has large powers in the union and is helped by the standing Bureau of the Union.

=== Leadership ===
- Gabriel Oprea - president (former vice-prime-minister)
- Titu Bojin - vice-president
- Nuțu Fonta - secretary general

== Electoral history ==
=== Legislative elections ===
Election	Chamber			Senate			Position	Aftermath
Election	Votes	%	Seats	Votes	%	Seats	Position	Aftermath
2012	4,344,288	58.63	10 / 412	4,457,526	60.10	5 / 176	1st (within USL)^{1}	USL government (2012–2014)
2012	4,344,288	58.63	10 / 412	4,457,526	60.10	5 / 176	1st (within USL)^{1}	PSD-UNPR-UDMR-PC government (2014)
2012	4,344,288	58.63	10 / 412	4,457,526	60.10	5 / 176	1st (within USL)^{1}	PSD-UNPR-ALDE government (2014–2015)
2012	4,344,288	58.63	10 / 412	4,457,526	60.10	5 / 176	1st (within USL)^{1}	Endorsing the technocratic Cioloș Cabinet (2015–2017)
2016	did not compete^{2}		3 / 329	did not compete^{2}		0 / 136	-	Opposition to PSD-ALDE government (2017–2018)
2016	did not compete^{2}		3 / 329	did not compete^{2}		0 / 136	-	Endorsing PSD-ALDE government (2018–2019)^{3}
2016	did not compete^{2}		3 / 329	did not compete^{2}		0 / 136	-	Endorsing PSD minority government (2019)
2016	did not compete^{2}		3 / 329	did not compete^{2}		0 / 136	-	Opposition to PNL minority government (2019–2020)

Notes:

^{1} The USL was an electoral and political alliance composed of two other smaller alliances as follows: the Centre Left Alliance (ACS) and the Centre Right Alliance (ACD). The members of the Centre Left Alliance were the PSD (with 58 senators and 149 deputies) and the UNPR (with 5 senators and 10 deputies). On the other hand, the members of the Centre Right Alliance were the PNL (with 51 senators and 101 deputies), and the PC (with 8 senators and 13 deputies).

^{2} In July 2016, the UNPR merged with the PMP. The merger was revoked in June 2018 and officially denounced by the PMP at their latest congress in March 2021.

^{3} After the merger with the PMP was revoked and the party was reinstated.

=== Presidential elections ===
Election	Candidate	First round			Second round		
Election	Candidate	Votes	Percentage	Position	Votes	Percentage	Position
2014	Victor Ponta^{1}	3,836,093	40.4%	1st	5,264,383	45.6%	2nd
2019	did not compete						
2024	did not compete						
2025	Endorsed Victor Ponta						

Notes:

^{1} Victor Ponta was a member of PSD, but was endorsed by an electoral alliance consisting of the PSD, the UNPR, and the PC.

=== European elections ===
Election	Votes	Percentage	MEPs	Position	EU Party	EP Group
2014	2,093,237	37.60%	2 / 32	1st (within USD)^{1}	—	S&D
2019	54,942	0.61%	0 / 33	11th	—	—

Notes:

^{1} Social Democratic Union (USD) members: PSD (12 MEPs), PC (2 MEPs), and UNPR.

== See also ==
- Politics of Romania
- List of political parties in Romania
- Movement in Support of the Army
