= 2012 Romanian parliamentary election =

- 9 December 2012

All 176 seats in the Senate All 412 seats in the Chamber of Deputies 89 S and 207 D seats needed for a majority
- Turnout: 41.76% (▲2.56pp)
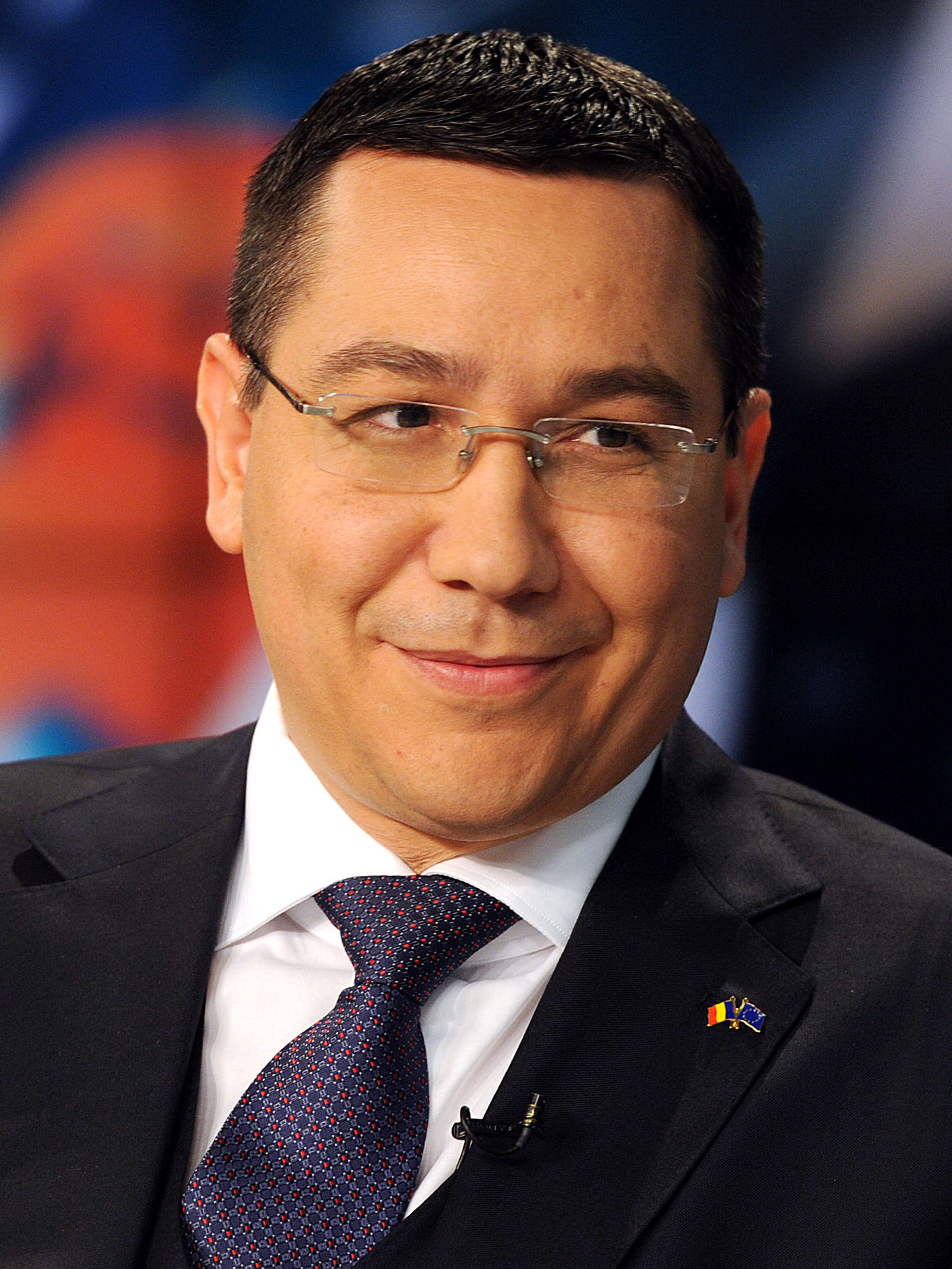

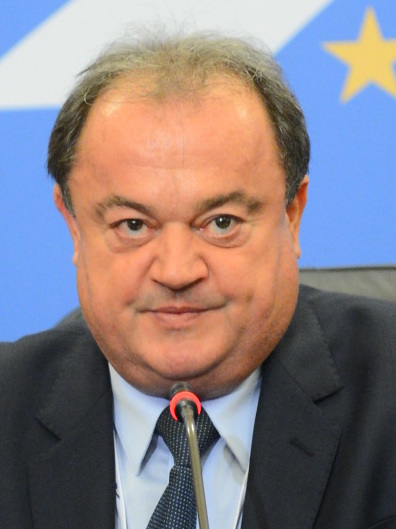

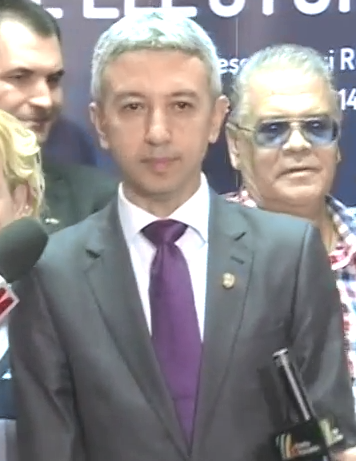

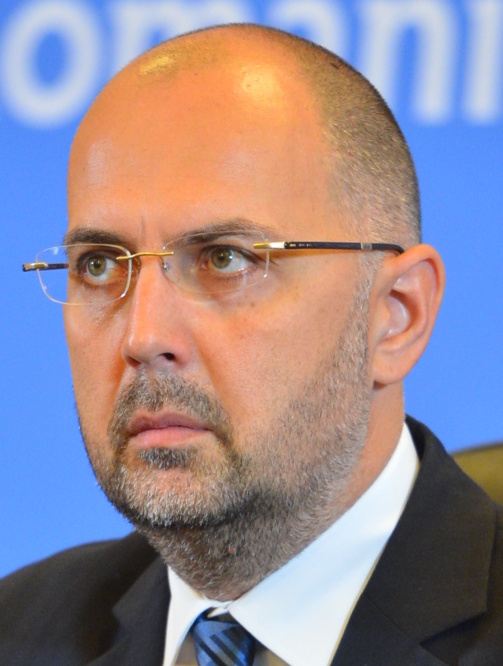

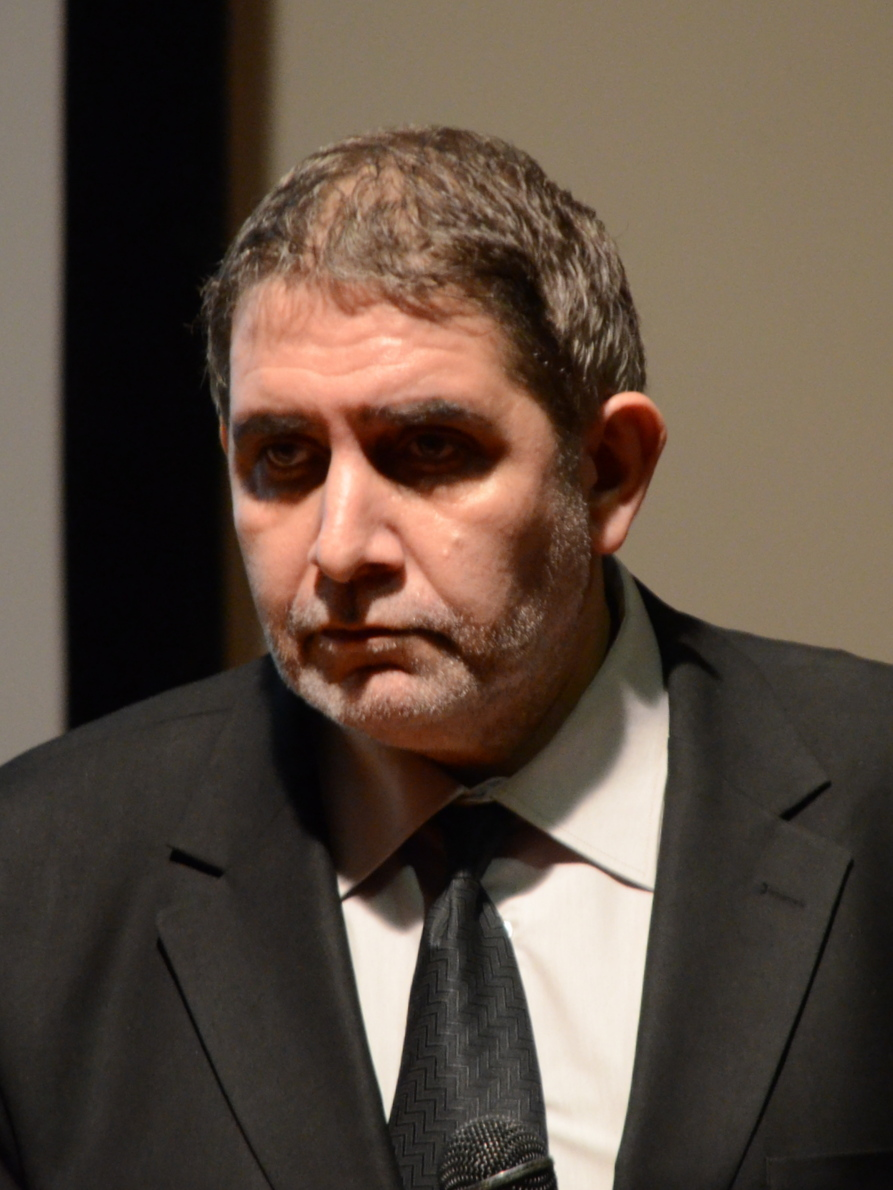
	First party	Second party	Third party
Leader	Victor Ponta	Vasile Blaga	Dan Diaconescu
Party	USL	ARD	PP–DD
Leader's seat	D – Dolj	S – Timiș	Was not elected
Last election	49+28 S / 114+65 D	51 S / 115 D	New party
Seats won	122 S / 273 D	24 S / 56 D	21 S / 47 D
Seat change	▲45 S / ▲94 D	▼27 S / ▼59 D	▲21 S / ▲47 D
Popular vote	4,344,288 D	1,223,189 D	1,036,730 D
Percentage	58.63% D	16.51% D	13.99% D
	Fourth party	Fifth party
Leader	Hunor Kelemen	Varujan Pambuccian (Note: Pambuccian, a member of the Union of Armenians of Romania, has been the parliamentary leader of the national minorities' group since 1996.)
Party	UDMR	Romanian ethnic minority parties
Leader's seat	D – Harghita	D - Nationwide (Note: National minorities have nationwide mandates and do not represent a specific county.)
Last election	9 S / 22 D	0 S / 18 D
Seats won	9 S / 18 D	0 S / 18 D
Seat change	0 S / ▼4 D	0 S / 0 D
Popular vote	380,656 D	161,836 D
Percentage	5.14% D	2.18% D
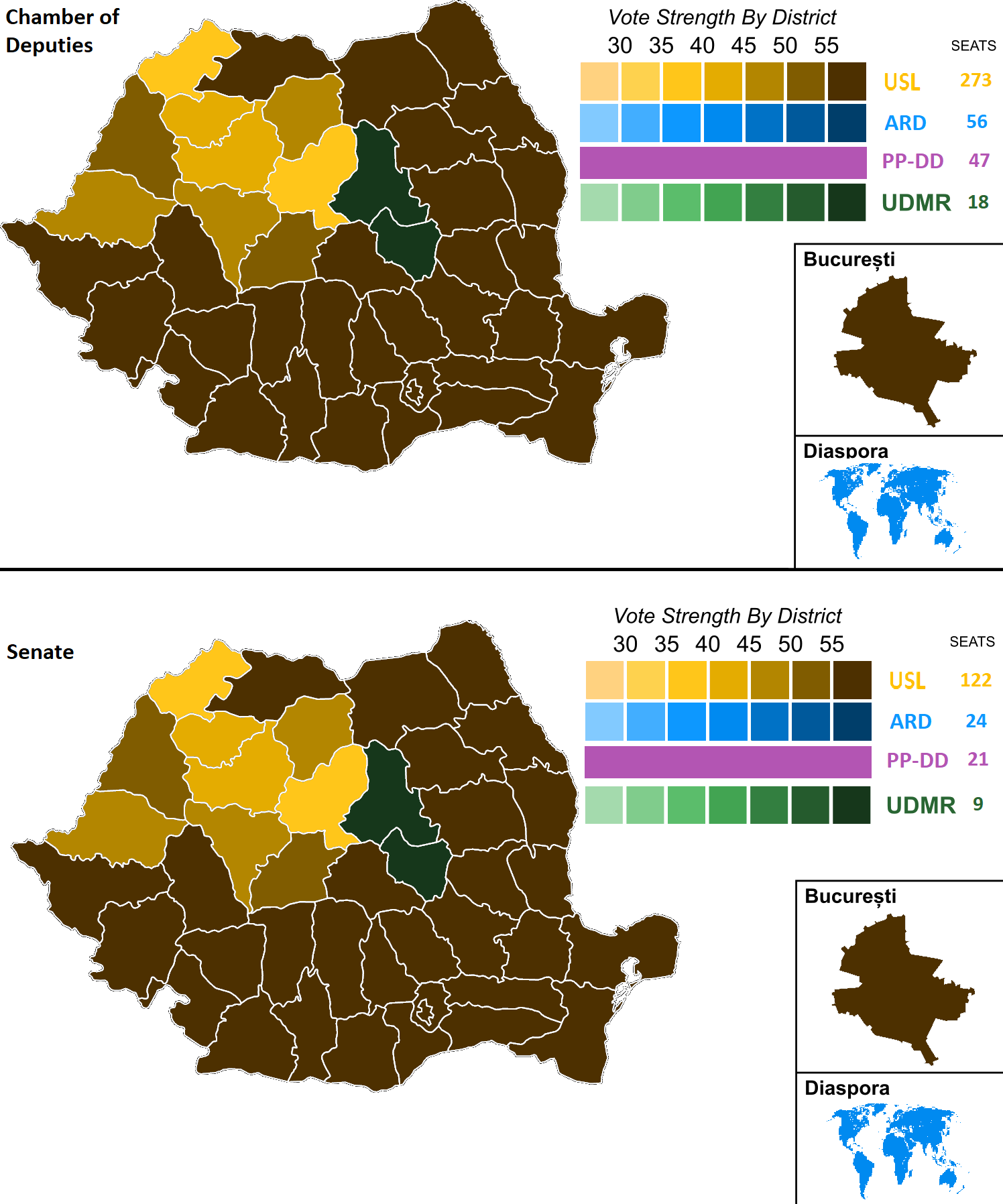
- The results for the Chamber of Deputies and for the Senate
Prime Minister before election
Victor Ponta
USL (PSD)
Elected Prime Minister
Victor Ponta
USL (PSD)

Parliamentary elections were held in Romania on 9 December 2012. The Social Liberal Union (USL) co-led by former Prime Minister Victor Ponta won an absolute majority in both the Chamber of Deputies and the Senate. At the time of the elections, despite the severe weather in several parts of the country, the turnout was approximately 42%, slightly higher than the last parliamentary elections held in 2008 which saw a turnout of 39%.

The Social Liberal Union (USL) obtained a huge majority in both the Chamber of Deputies and the Senate, with 60% and 59% respectively of the votes and in MP mandates, namely a record number of 395 seats. Far behind, the Right Romania Alliance (ARD) came in second place with only 17% of the vote and 80 seats, losing about half of what they won as the Democratic Liberal Party (PDL) in 2008.

The ARD was officially dissolved after the elections. People's Party – Dan Diaconescu (PP–DD) and the Democratic Alliance of Hungarians in Romania (UDMR/RMDSZ) were the only other political groups that won seats in the Senate. Several parties of ethnic minorities also received individual seats in the Chamber of Deputies.

== Background ==
=== Protests ===
Following weeks of demonstrations against austerity measures demanded by the International Monetary Fund for a multi-billion US dollar loan, former Prime Minister Emil Boc (PDL) resigned on 6 February 2012. The opposition, represented at that time by the Social Liberal Union (USL) leaders Victor Ponta (PSD) and Crin Antonescu (PNL), then called for early elections. However, as the three parties behind the government (namely the PDL, UDMR/RMDSZ, and UNPR) still relied on a slight parliamentary majority, an ad interim solution was agreed with the opposition that the government could stay in power until the next elections, conditional of electing a political independent technocrat as the new prime minister. Consequently, the former Foreign Intelligence Service (SIE) Director Mihai Răzvan Ungureanu was appointed acting prime minister on 9 February 2012.

The government announced the intention to hold parliamentary and local elections at the same time, by lengthening the term of the local elected officials (i.e. Mayors, Local Councils, County Councils, and County Councils Presidents). It was suspected that the attempt to delay local elections was related to the fact that massive street protests had erupted in the meantime, and, at the same time, the opposition political alliance Social Liberal Union (USL) went on strike in the Parliament, pushing for early parliamentary elections to be called one or two weeks after local elections in June. Initially, the government proposed an election date in November 2012, but as the mayoral mandates already expired in June 2012, this was ruled unconstitutional. The local elections were eventually held on 10 June, with an unexpected runoff and three repeated elections on 17 June.

=== Motion of no confidence ===
The political alliance Social Liberal Union (USL), at that time comprising the three parties PSD, PNL, and PC, initiated and succeeded to vote a motion of no confidence against Mihai Răzvan Ungureanu and his cabinet on 27 April 2012 after just two months in office. Afterwards, former President Traian Băsescu nominated then opposition leader and president of the Social Democratic Party, Victor Ponta as Prime Minister.

=== Electoral system ===
In May 2012, the new USL government passed an electoral law in parliament, which changed the election system to a single-round FPTP system without the 5% electoral threshold with extra seats for minorities, both ethnic minorities and Romanian minorities. However, after PDL, fearing poor results in the elections ahead because of it, appealed the Constitutional Court of Romania who invalidated the law on 27 June 2012 and reinstated the old one. A consequence of this is that after the 2012 parliamentary elections the size of the new Parliament grew to a record total number of 588, an added 117 seats than in the last parliament: 39 supplementary Senate seats, and 97 supplementary Chamber of Deputies seats, including the 18 seats for the ethnic minorities parties and organisations.

=== Party standings and political alliances ===
In late 2010, the PSD+PC Alliance broke up without affecting the MEP seat held by the PC. In January 2011, the National Liberal Party – PNL and the Conservative Party – PC formed the Centre Right Alliance – ACD. In February 2011, ACD together with the Social Democratic Party – PSD formed the Social Liberal Union – USL. Following the local election, PSD, and the National Union for the Progress of Romania – UNPR formed the Centre Left Alliance, thus UNPR joining USL in mid 2012.

For the 2012 local election PDL formed various county-level alliances with a wide range of parties, including UNPR. Following the presidential impeachment referendum it urged the formation of a political alliance with a number of minor political parties and foundations, such as New Republic led by Mihail Neamțu, and the centre-right Civic Initiative led by Mihai Răzvan Ungureanu. Eventually Ungureanu joined a minor party, Civic Force (FC), and was elected its president. The alliance registered at the Central Electoral Bureau was called Right Romania Alliance – ARD formed by PDL, PNȚCD, and FC.

== Opinion polling ==
The PDL centred ARD alliance was formed late after the 2012 Romanian presidential impeachment referendum. As a result, some opinion polls do not include the ARD. Opinion polls that show PDL do not show ARD.

The UNPR joined USL in August–September 2012, in a sceptical environment. As a result, some opinion polls showed both political entities. The PNG-CD leader George Becali joined the PNL and ran backed by the USL in Bucharest. Furthermore, his former party did not propose any candidates for this election.

Polling Firm	Date	Source										
Polling Firm	Date	Source	USL	ARD	PDL	PP-DD	UDMR	PRM	PNG-CD	UNPR	Others	Undecided
IMAS	6 September 2012		57.1%	N/A	17.8%	14.1%	5.8%	3%	0.6%	0.3%	1.3%	N/A
CSCI	9 September 2012		62%	N/A	19%	11%	4%	2%	N/A	N/A	2%	N/A
CSOP	15 September 2012		50%	N/A	21%	12%	5%	3%	1%	1%	5%	N/A
CSOP	15 September 2012		49%	24%	N/A	14%	5%	3%	2%	1%	2%	N/A
IMAS	27 September 2012		55%	N/A	17.8%	15.5%	5.3%	2%	1.1%	0.3%	3%	N/A
CSCI	28 September 2012		58%	16%	N/A	18%	5%	2%	1%	N/A	N/A	N/A
Avangarde	21 November 2012		62%	15%	N/A	14%	3%	2%	1%	N/A	3%	N/A
CCSB	3 December 2012		62%	17%	N/A	10%	5%	2%	N/A	N/A	4%	N/A

== Candidates ==
Out of the 12 contesting parties running for the Chamber of Deputies and the Senate, only three submitted a full list of candidates: Social Liberal Union (USL), Right Romania Alliance (ARD), and the Democratic Alliance of Hungarians in Romania (UDMR/RMDSZ). People's Party - Dan Diaconescu (PP-DD) submitted a list with one candidate less than all the available colleges. Only one independent candidate decided to run for the Senate and 12 for the Chamber of Deputies. There were 18 national minorities associations proposing one candidate each for the Chamber of Deputies.

=== Contesting parties and alliances ===
Party	Abbr.	Ideology	Alliance with
Social Liberal Union	USL	Social liberalism Big tent	PSD, PNL, PC, UNPR, PV
Right Romania Alliance	ARD	Conservatism; Economic liberalism	PD-L, FC, PNȚCD
People's Party – Dan Diaconescu	PP-DD	Left-wing populism Left-wing nationalism	
Democratic Alliance of Hungarians in Romania	UDMR	Hungarian minority interests Social conservatism	
Great Romania Party	PRM	Right-wing populism National conservatism	
Romanian Ecologist Party	PER	Green conservatism Christian democracy	
Hungarian People's Party of Transylvania	EMNP/ PPMT	Hungarian minority interests Conservatism	
People's Party	PP		
Socialist Alliance Party	PAS	Communism; European federalism	
Social Protection People's Party	PPPS	Social liberalism Pensioners' interests	
Workers' Social Democratic Party	PMSD	Social democracy Labourism	
National Democratic Christian Party	PNDC	Christian democracy Nationalism	
Ethnic minority parties		Minority interests	
Independent candidates		Independent politics	

== Conduct ==
Although a report by the OSCE stated the elections were administered "professionally and efficiently", the electioneering, initiated on 9 November and ended on 8 December, was not without incidents.

Dan Diaconescu, candidate from PP-DD in the same college of Chamber of Deputies in Târgu Jiu with Prime Minister Victor Ponta, is investigated for electoral bribery. Authorities were notified after PSD representatives within Gorj County Council filed a complaint regarding the distribution of food and the organization of an electoral spectacle before the electioneering. According to the Emergency Ordinance issued on 6 November by Ponta Cabinet, offering food, drink and money in the campaign is illegal.

On 11 November, an old man from the commune of Mătăsari (Gorj County) had a heart attack shortly after a discussion in contradictory with PDL deputy Constantin Severus Militaru. PDL deputy said that the old man was very indignant because his pension was not recalculated, although he had worked all his life in mining.

The President of PDL Vrancea, Alin Trășculescu, was caught in the act by anticorruption prosecutors while receiving €50,000 from a businessman in the form of bribe. He was detained for 24 hours for allegations of lobbyism, instigation to false and incitement to the misdemeanor of money laundering. Alin Trășculescu was under the supervision of National Anticorruption Department for two years. He claimed he could get contracts with the State, from the Ministry of Development and Tourism, led then by Elena Udrea.

== Results ==
The Social Liberal Union (USL) maintained majority in both the Chamber of Deputies and the Senate.

=== Senate ===
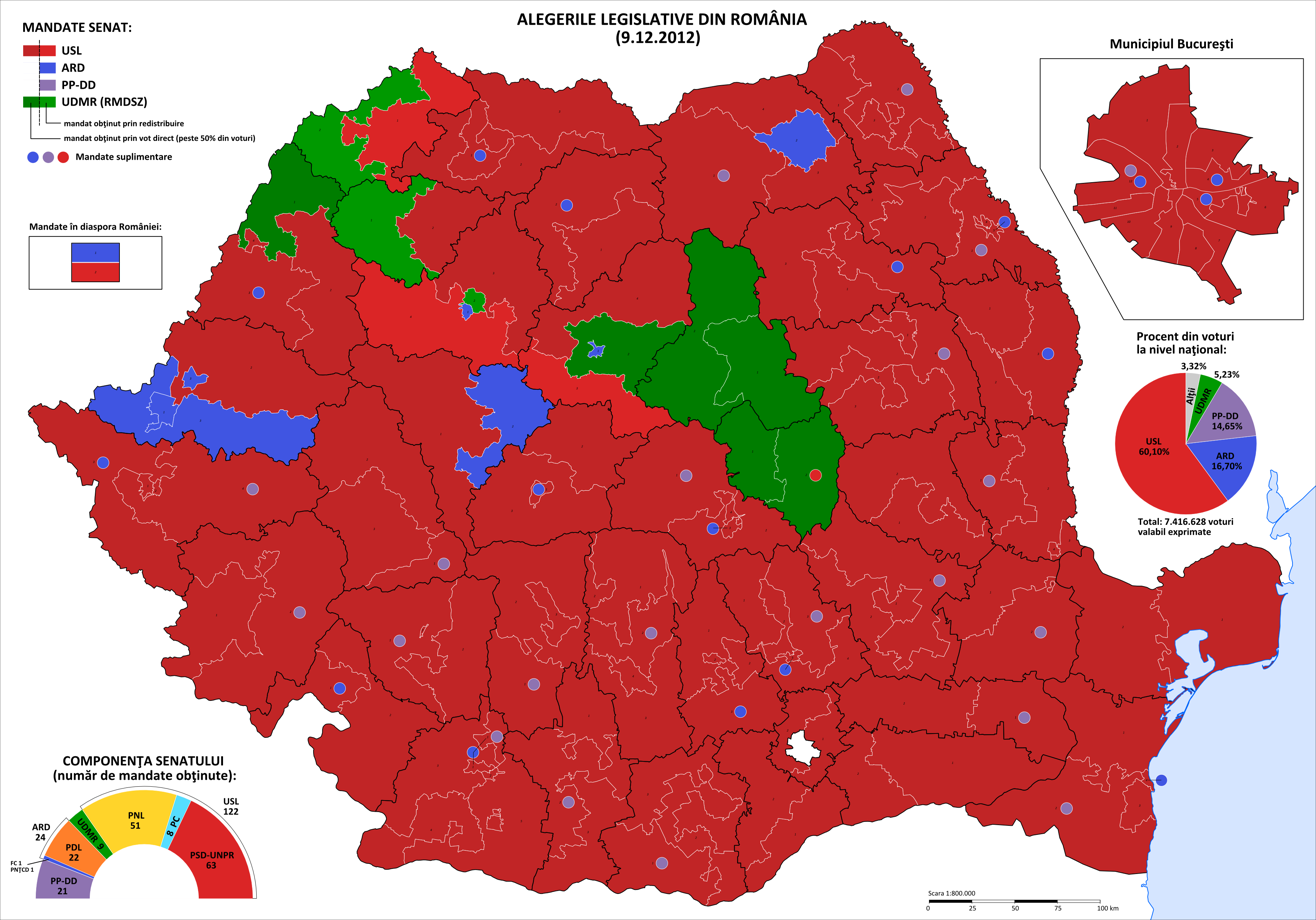
The results for the Senate

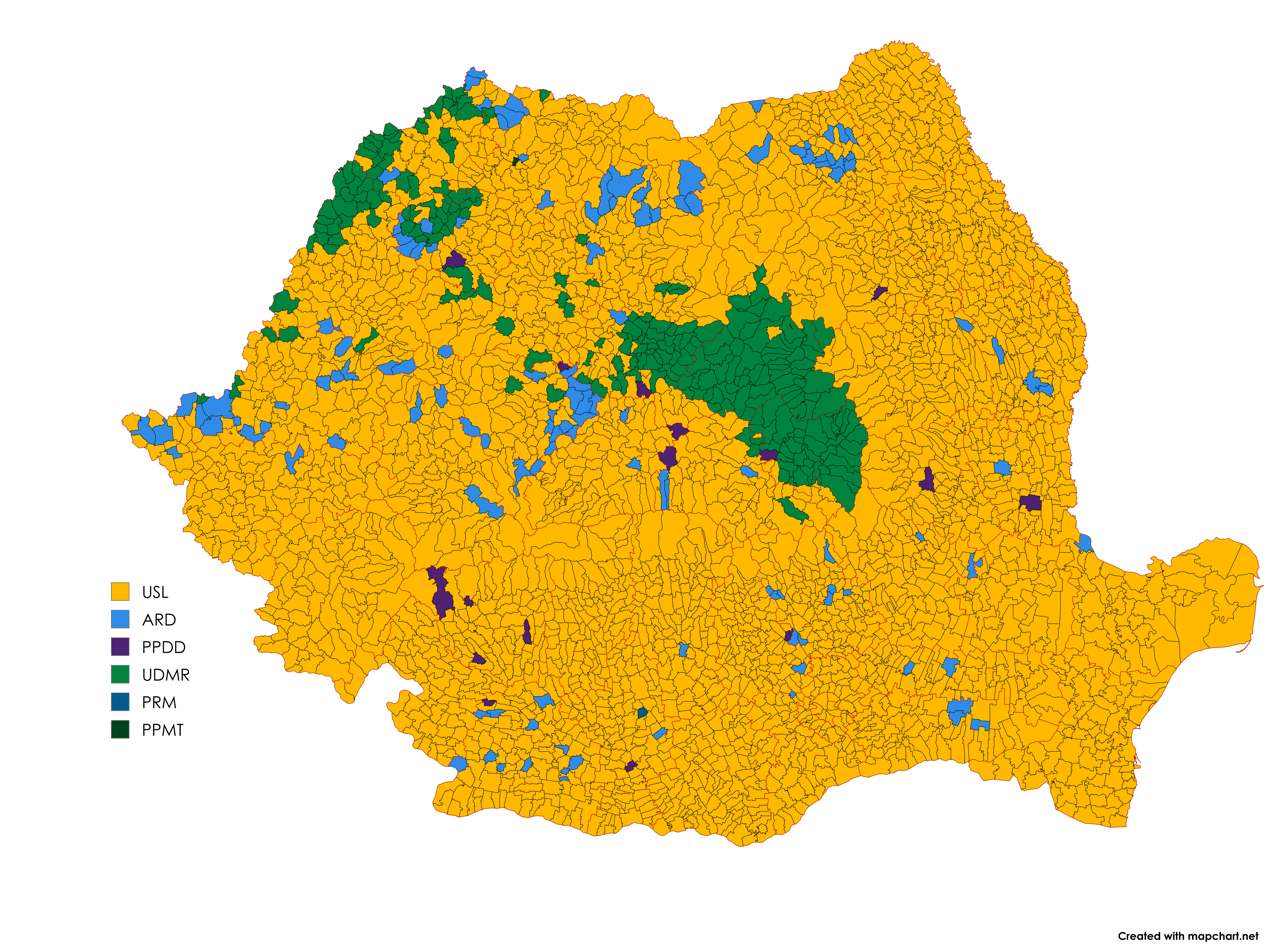
Results of the 2012 Romanian legislative elections, showing the number of votes for the party that won a plurality in each locality. Results for the Senate.

Party	Votes	%	Seats	+/–
Social Liberal Union	4,457,526	60.10	122	+45
Right Romania Alliance	1,239,318	16.71	24	−27
People's Party – Dan Diaconescu	1,086,822	14.65	21	New
Democratic Alliance of Hungarians in Romania	388,528	5.24	9	0
Greater Romania Party	109,142	1.47	0	0
Hungarian People's Party of Transylvania	58,765	0.79	0	New
Ecologist Party of Romania	58,335	0.79	0	0
People's Party	11,681	0.16	0	New
Socialist Alliance Party	2,171	0.03	0	0
Social Protection People's Party	2,100	0.03	0	0
Workers' Social Democratic Party	1,380	0.02	0	New
National Democratic Christian Party	132	0.00	0	0
Independents	728	0.01	0	0
Total	7,416,628	100.00	176	+39
Valid votes	7,416,628	96.40		
Invalid/blank votes	276,948	3.60		
Total votes	7,693,576	100.00		
Registered voters/turnout	18,423,066	41.76		
Source: BEC

=== Chamber of Deputies ===
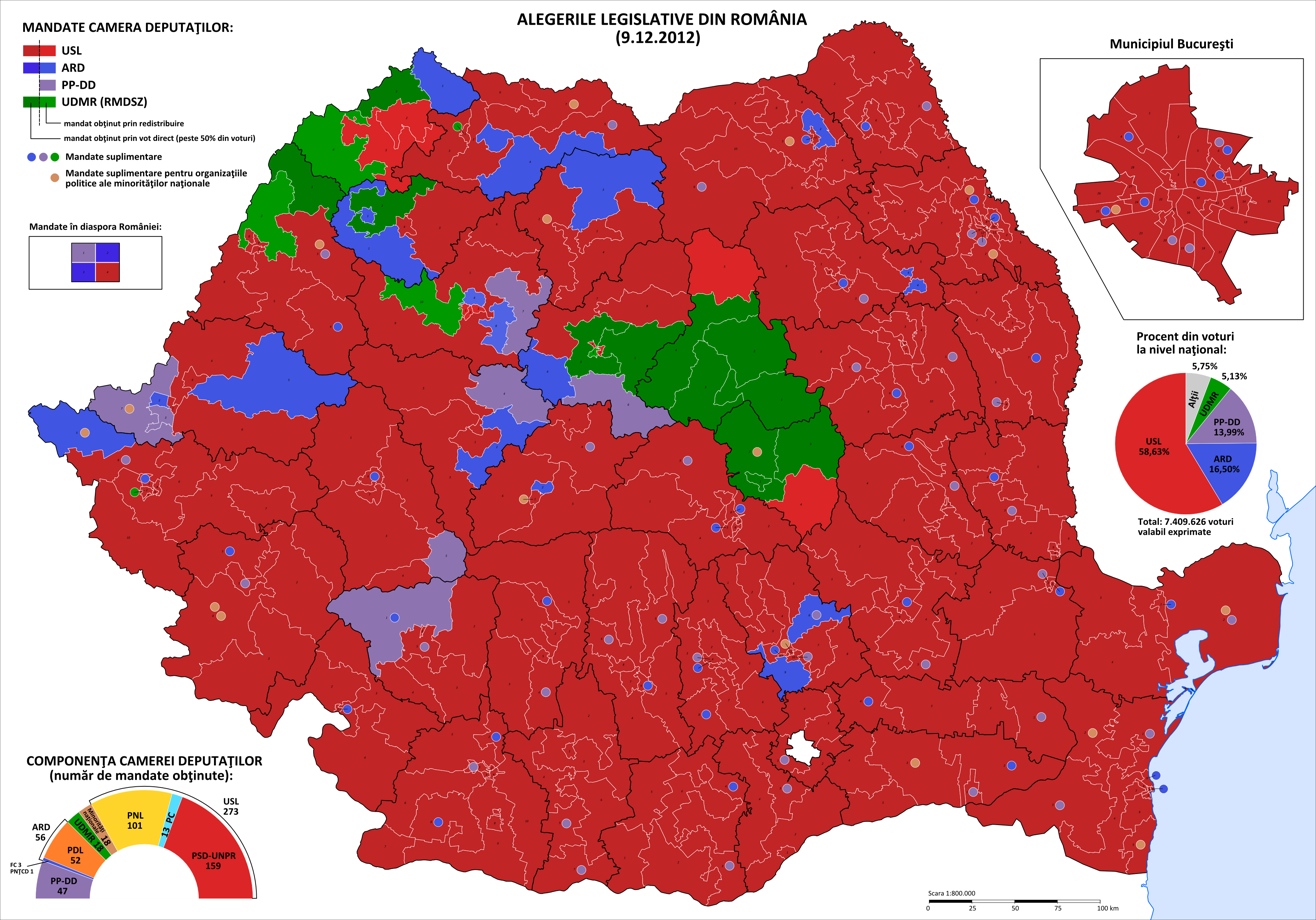
The results for the Chamber of Deputies

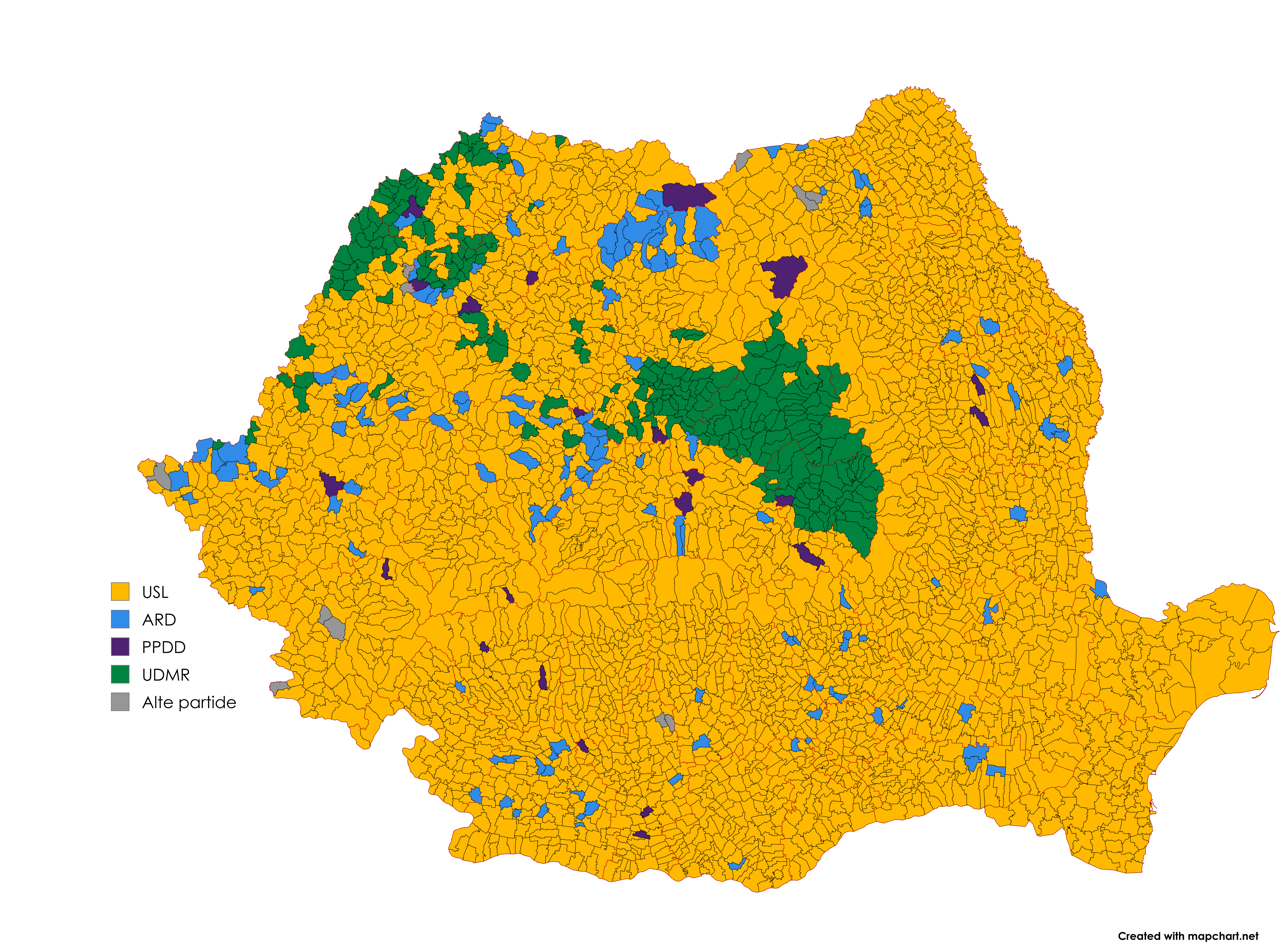
Results of the 2012 Romanian legislative elections, showing the number of votes for the party that won a plurality in each locality. Results for the Chamber of Deputies.

Party	Votes	%	Seats	+/–
Social Liberal Union	4,344,288	58.63	273	+94
Right Romania Alliance	1,223,189	16.51	56	−59
People's Party – Dan Diaconescu	1,036,730	13.99	47	New
Democratic Alliance of Hungarians in Romania	380,656	5.14	18	−4
Greater Romania Party	92,382	1.25	0	0
Ecologist Party of Romania	58,178	0.79	0	0
Hungarian People's Party of Transylvania	47,955	0.65	0	New
Democratic Forum of Germans	39,175	0.53	1	0
Party of the Roma	22,124	0.30	1	0
Association of Macedonians of Romania	12,212	0.16	1	0
Union of Armenians of Romania	10,761	0.15	1	0
Bulgarian Union of Banat–Romania	10,155	0.14	1	0
Federation of the Jewish Communities in Romania	10,019	0.14	1	0
League of Albanians of Romania	10,010	0.14	1	0
Hellenic Union of Romania	9,863	0.13	1	0
People's Party	9,319	0.13	0	New
Democratic Union of Turkish-Muslim Tatars	9,291	0.13	1	0
Democratic Union of Slovaks and Czechs of Romania	8,677	0.12	1	0
Community of the Lipovan Russians	8,328	0.11	1	0
Union of Serbs of Romania	8,207	0.11	1	0
Union of Poles of Romania	8,023	0.11	1	0
Association of Italians of Romania	7,943	0.11	1	0
Union of the Ukrainians of Romania	7,353	0.10	1	0
Democratic Turkish Union of Romania	7,324	0.10	1	0
Union of Croats of Romania	6,281	0.08	1	0
Cultural Union of Ruthenians of Romania	5,265	0.07	1	0
Socialist Alliance Party	2,331	0.03	0	0
Social Protection People's Party	929	0.01	0	0
Workers' Social Democratic Party	231	0.00	0	New
National Democratic Christian Party	38	0.00	0	0
Independents	12,389	0.17	0	0
Total	7,409,626	100.00	412	+78
Valid votes	7,409,626	96.31		
Invalid/blank votes	283,653	3.69		
Total votes	7,693,279	100.00		
Registered voters/turnout	18,423,066	41.76		
Source: BEC

== Local referendums ==
Two local non-binding referendums were also organized on 9 December, concerning environmental issues.

The first one took place in Alba county and people were asked whether they were in favor or against the Roșia Montană mining project. Although 62% of those who voted voiced support for the controversial project, the referendum did not meet the required turnout of 50%, as only 43,2% of voters turned up.

The second referendum was held in the communes of Limanu, Costinești as well as in the city of Mangalia and asked voters to say whether they were in favor or against the use, by Chevron, of shale gas extraction by means of hydraulic fracturing. This referendum failed to meet the required turnout as well.
