= Politics of Cluj-Napoca =

Mayor of Cluj-Napoca
- Romanian: Primarul Municipiului Cluj-Napoca
- Incumbent; Emil Boc since 22 June 2012
- Inaugural holder: Dr. Iulian Pop
- Formation: 1919 (after the Unification of Romania)
- Website: http://www.primariaclujnapoca.ro/

Cluj-Napoca Local Council Consiliul Local al Municipiului Cluj-Napoca

Type
- Type: Unicameral

Leadership
- Deputy Mayor: Dan Ștefan Tarcea, PNL since 22 June 2016
- Deputy Mayor: Emese Oláh, UDMR since 22 June 2016

Structure
- Seats: 27
- Local Council political groups: Social Democratic Party (2) Save Romania Union (5) Democratic Alliance of Hungarians in Romania (4) National Liberal Party (16)

Elections
- Local Council voting system: Closed list, D'Hondt method
- Mayor voting system: Direct vote, Two-round system (until 2012), Single round system (since 2012)
- Last Local Council election: 27 September 2020
- Last Mayor election: 27 September 2020

Meeting place
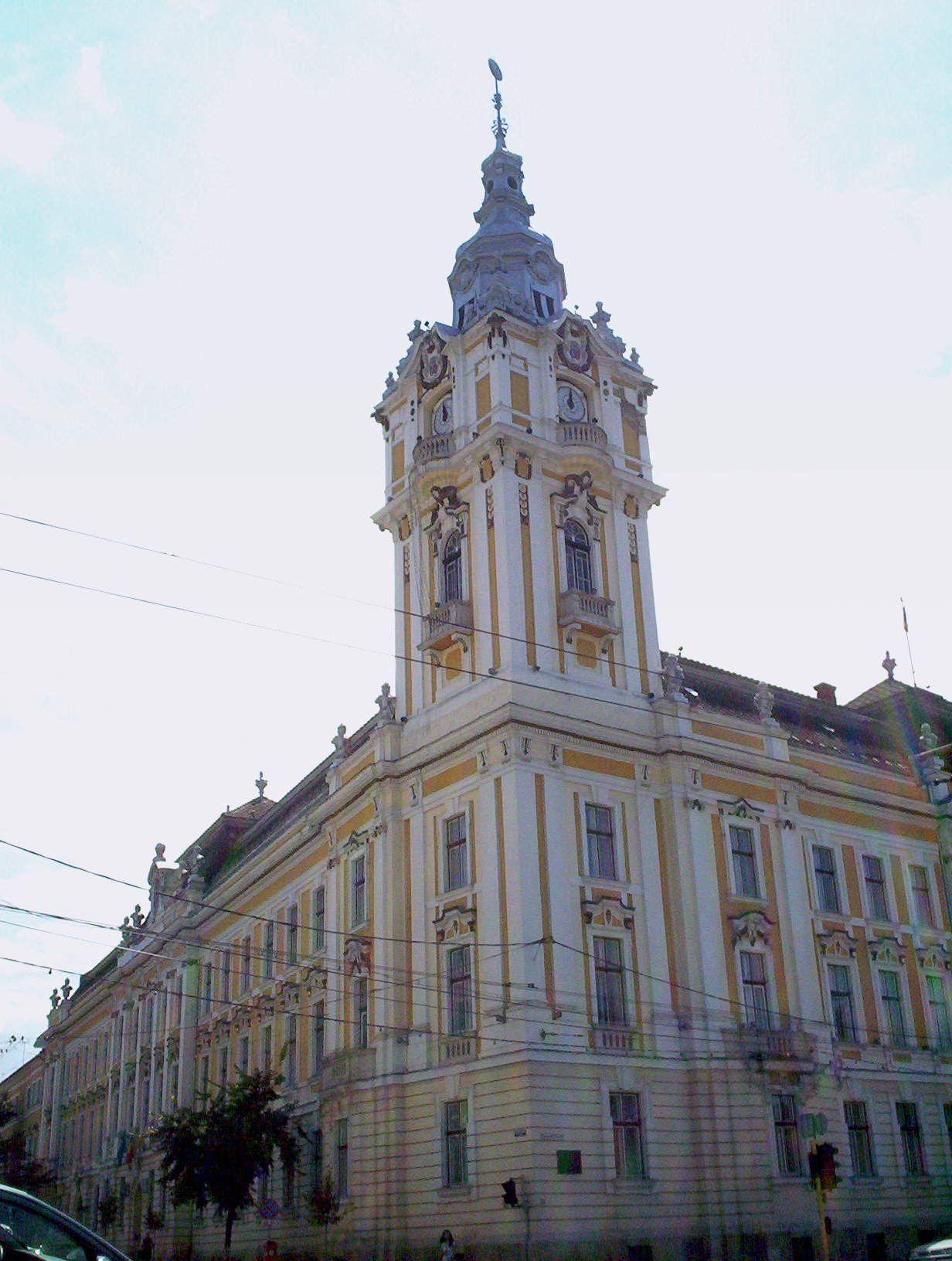
- Cluj-Napoca City Hall

Website
- http://www.primariaclujnapoca.ro/

The last general local election was held on 27 September 2020. The threshold was 5%. On the 15 February 2009, a by-election was held for the office of Mayor of Cluj-Napoca, following the nomination of the previous Mayor, Emil Boc as Prime Minister.

== List of mayors ==
#	Name	Portrait	Born-Died	Election	Took office	Left office	Party
Principality of Transylvania
	József Pataki				April 1861	?	
Austro-Hungarian Empire
	Zsigmond Szentkirályi				1 September 1867	1868	
	Unknown				1868	1874	
	Elek Simon				1 February 1874	1 September 1880	
	Károly Haller				1 August 1884	1 May 1886	
	Géza Albach				1 May 1886	30 June 1898	
	Géza Szvacsina				1 July 1898	30 November 1913	
	Gusztáv Haller				1 December 1913	19 January 1919	
Kingdom of Romania
1	Iulian Pop				19 January 1919	April 1923	
—	Aurel Moga				April 1923	April 1923	
2	Octavian Utalea				1 May 1923	14 March 1926	
3	Theodor Mihali				21 April 1926	21 October 1926	
4	Vasile Osvadă				21 October 1926	23 June 1927	
(3)	Theodor Mihali				23 June 1927	24 July 1931	
5	Prof. Coriolan Tătaru				24 July 1931	31 January 1932	
6	Dr. Sebastian Bornemisa				1 February 1932	11 June 1932	
7	Dr. Victor Deleu				11 June 1932	18 November 1933	
8	Prof. Dr. Nicolae Drăganu				18 November 1933	1 January 1938	
9	Dr. Laurian Gabor				1 January 1938	13 February 1938	
10	Richard Filipescu				17 February 1938	23 September 1938	
(6)	Dr. Sebastian Bornemisa				23 September 1938	September 1940	
Kingdom of Hungary (Vienna awards)
	Dr. Vasarhelyi Lászlo				September 1940	16 April 1941	
	Keledy Tibor				16 April 1941	1944	
Kingdom of Romania (restored)
11	Dr. Ioan Demeter				1944	1944	
12	Tudor Bugnariu				1944	1945	
13	Gheorghe Chintezanu				1944	1947	
Communist Romania
(13)	Gheorghe Chintezanu				1947	1952	
14	Petre Jurca				1952	1957	
15	Aurel Duca				1956	1960	
16	Gheorghe Lăpădeanu				1960	1968	
17	Remus Bucșa				1968	1975	
18	Constantin Crișan				1975	1983	
19	Constantin Chirilă				1983	1985	
20	Nicolae Preda				1985	1986	
21	Gheorghe Cordea				1986	1989	
Romania
22	Ion Pop				1989	1990	
23	Alexandru Șerban				1990	1990	
24	Mihai Tălpean				1990	1991	
25	Teodor Groza				1991	1992	
26	Gheorghe Funar			1992	1992	June 2004	PUNR
26	Gheorghe Funar			1996	1992	June 2004	PUNR/PRM
26	Gheorghe Funar			2000	1992	June 2004	PRM
27	Emil Boc			2004	June 2004	December 2008	PD/PD-L
27	Emil Boc			2008	June 2004	December 2008	PD/PD-L
28	Sorin Apostu			—	December 2008	November 2011	PD-L
28	Sorin Apostu			2009	December 2008	November 2011	PD-L
—	Radu Moisin			—	November 2011	22 June 2012	PD-L
(27)	Emil Boc			2012	22 June 2012		PD-L/PNL
(27)	Emil Boc			2016	22 June 2012		PNL
(27)	Emil Boc			2020	22 June 2012		PNL

== Mayor and Municipal Council election 2000 ==
Summary of the June 2000 Cluj Napoca Local election results
Parties and alliances	Votes	%	Seats
Democratic Alliance of Hungarians in Romania (Romanian: Uniunea Democrată Maghiară din România)	31,618	22.50	8
Greater Romania Party (Romanian: Partidul România Mare)	30,762	21.89	8
Party of Social Democracy in Romania, now Social Democratic Party (Romanian: Partidul Social Democrat)	16,605	11.81	5
Romanian Democratic Convention (Romanian: Convenţia Democrată Română)	10,264	7.30	3
Romanian National Unity Party	? (no data)	? (no data)	3
National Liberal Party (Partidul Naţional Liberal)	5,432	3.86	2
Party of Alliance for Romania	4,606	3.26	2
Total (turnout 54.5%)			31

== Mayor and Municipal Council election 2004 ==
Local council composition: Justice and Truth Alliance Democratic Union of Hungarians Social Democratic Party Greater Romania Party

Summary of the 6 June 2004 Cluj Napoca Local election results
Parties and alliances	Votes	%	Seats
Justice and Truth Alliance (Alianţa Dreptate si Adevăr): National Liberal Party (Partidul Naţional Liberal); Democratic Party (Partidul Democrat)	43,823	29.57	9
Greater Romania Party(Partidul România Mare)	30,864	20.82	6
Social Democratic Party (Partidul Social Democrat)	30,457	20.55	6
Hungarian Democratic Union of Romania (Uniunea Democrată Maghiară din România)	28,172	19.01	6
Humanist Party of Romania, now Conservative Party (Partidul Conservator)	2,963	2.0	-
Romanian National Unity Party	2,015	1.36	-
Christian-Democratic National Peasants' Party	1,393	0.94	-
Total (turnout %)			27

== Mayor and Municipal Council election 2008 ==
Political structure of the Local (City) Council for the 2008 - 2012 legislature

Bolded names represent the parties that entered the Local Council.

Summary of the 1 June 2008 Cluj Napoca Local election results
Parties and alliances	Votes	%	Seats
**Democratic Liberal Party (Partidul Democrat)**			16
**Hungarian Democratic Union of Romania** **(Uniunea Democrată Maghiară din România)**			5
**National Liberal Party (Partidul Naţional Liberal)**			3
**Social Democratic Party (Partidul Social Democrat)**			3
Greater Romania Party(Partidul România Mare)			0
Conservative Party (Partidul Conservator)			0
Christian Social Popular Union (Uniunea Populară Social Creştină)			0
PP ( )			0
Green Party (Partidul Verde)			
National Initiative Party (Partidul Iniţiativa Naţionalã)			0
(PCM)			0
(UPSS)			0
Socialist Alliance Party (PAS)			0
Ecologist Party of Romania (PER)			0
(PRE)			0
Christian-Democratic National Peasants' Party (Partidul Naţional Ţărănesc Creştin Democrat)			0
(PNG-CD)			0
Valentin Guia (independent)			0
Total (turnout %)			**27**

=== Mayoral by-election, 2009 ===
Summary of the 15 February 2009 Cluj-Napoca Local partial election results
Candidates - Parties and alliances	Votes	%
**Sorin Apostu - Democratic Liberal Party (Partidul Democrat-Liberal)**	**49,234**	**56**
Marius Nicoară - National Liberal Party (Partidul Naţional Liberal)		23
Teodor Pop-Puscas - PSD+PC Alliance (Alianţa PSD+PC)		
Sorin Oancea - Christian-Democratic National Peasants' Party (Partidul Naţional Ţărănesc Creştin Democrat)		
Gheorghe Oros - Socialist Alliance Party (Partidul Alianţa Socialistă)		
Gheorghe Aştileanu - New Generation Party – Christian Democratic (PArtidul Noua Generaţie - Creştin Democrat)		
Gergely Balasz - Hungarian Civic Party (Partidul Civic Maghiar)		
Laszlo Csaba - Green Party (Partidul Verde)		
Grigore Pop - Independent		
Total: 274,300 (turnout 30.19%)		

== Mayor and Municipal Council election 2012 ==
Bolded names represent the parties that gained seats in the Cluj-Napoca Local Council.

Social Liberal Union (12) Democratic Liberal Party (10) Democratic Alliance of Hungarians in Romania (4) People's Party - Dan Diaconescu (1)

Summary of the 10 June 2012 Cluj-Napoca Local Council election results
Parties and alliances	Votes	%	Seats
**Social Liberal Union (Uniunea Social Liberală)**	**51,831**	**39.65**	**12**
**Democratic Liberal Party (Partidul Democrat Liberal)**	**43,495**	**33.27**	**10**
**Democratic Alliance of Hungarians in Romania (Uniunea Democrată Maghiară din România)**	**16,911**	**12.93**	**4**
**People's Party – Dan Diaconescu (Partidul Poporului - Dan Diaconescu)**	**7,413**	**5.67**	**1**
Christian Democratic National Peasants' Party (Partidul Naţional Ţărănesc Creştin Democrat)	2,183	1.67	0
Hungarian People's Party in Transylvania (Partidul Popular Maghiar din Transilvania)	2,158	1.65	0
Greater Romania Party (Partidul România Mare)	2,136	1.63	0
Ecologist Party of Romania (Partidul Ecologist Român)	1,454	1.11	0
National Union for the Advancement of Romania (Uniunea Națională pentru Progresul României)	799	0.61	0
Romanian Socialist Party (Partidul Socialist Român)	456	0.34	0
Green Party (Partidul Verde)	446	0.34	0
People's Party (Cojocaru Law) (Partidul Poporului (Legea Cojocaru))	424	0.32	0
Romanian Ecologist Union Party (Partidul Uniunea Ecologistă din România)	367	0.28	0
Gipsy Democratic Civic Alliance (Alianța Civică Democratică a Rromilor)	304	0.23	0
Party of the Roma (Asociația Partida Romilor "Pro-Europa")	208	0.15	0
Socialist Alliance Party (Partidul Alianța Socialistă)	117	0.08	0
Total (turnout %) Biroul Electoral Central - Alegerile locale 2012	307,532	100	**27**

Summary of the 10 June 2012 Cluj-Napoca Mayor election results
Parties and alliances	Candidate	Votes	%
**Democratic Liberal Party (Partidul Democrat Liberal)**	Emil Boc	**53,674**	**40.60**
Social Liberal Union (Uniunea Social Liberală)	Marius Nicoară	52,251	39.53
Democratic Alliance of Hungarians in Romania (Uniunea Democrată Maghiară din România)	Péter Eckstein-Kovács	12,225	9.24
People's Party – Dan Diaconescu (Partidul Poporului - Dan Diaconescu)	Iuliu Țăgorean	4,689	3.54
Independent	Mircia Giurgiu	3,368	2.54
Hungarian People's Party in Transylvania (Partidul Popular Maghiar din Transilvania)	Balazs Gergely	1,523	1.15
Independent	Mădălina Paul	1,245	0.94
Greater Romania Party (Partidul România Mare)	Ioan Avram	1.221	0.92
Christian Democratic National Peasants' Party (Partidul Naţional Ţărănesc Creştin Democrat)	Emil Culda	1,064	0.80
People's Party (Cojocaru Law) (Partidul Poporului (Legea Cojocaru))	Dalia Fodor	395	0.29
Ecologist Party of Romania (Partidul Ecologist Român)	Elmer Antal	385	0.29
Romanian Socialist Party (Partidul Socialist Român)	Liliana Iancu	135	0.10
Total (turnout %) Biroul Electoral Central - Alegerile locale 2012 (p. 164)		307,532	100

== Mayor and Municipal Council election 2016 ==
Bolded names represent the parties that gained seats in the Cluj-Napoca Local Council.

National Liberal Party (17) Democratic Alliance of Hungarians in Romania (5) Social Democratic Party (5)

Summary of the 5 June 2016 Cluj-Napoca Local Council election results
Parties and alliances	Votes	%	Seats
**National Liberal Party (Partidul Național Liberal)**	**49,218**	**49.86**	**17**
**Democratic Alliance of Hungarians in Romania (Uniunea Democrată Maghiară din România)**	**16,490**	**16.70**	**5**
**Social Democratic Party + Alliance of Liberals and Democrats (Alianța Liberalilor și Democraților)**	**13,955**	**14.13**	**5**
Romanian Social Party (Partidul Social Românesc)	3,214	3.25	0
Liberal Movement Party (Partidul Mișcarea Liberală)	2,974	3.01	0
M10 Party (Partidul M10)	2,946	2.98	0
People's Movement Party (Partidul Mișcarea Populară)	2,834	2.87	0
Democratic Christian Union Party of Romania (Partidul Uniunea Creștin Democrată din România)	2,729	2.76	0
Humanist Power Party (Partidul Puterii Umaniste)	1,814	1.83	0
Christian Democratic National Peasants' Party (Partidul Național Țărănesc Creștin Democrat)	1.649	1.67	0
Hungarian People's Party of Transylvania (Partidul Popular Maghiar din Transilvania)	881	0.89	0
Total (turnout %) Autoritatea Electorală Permanentă - Alegerile locale 2016	98,704	100	**27**

Summary of the 5 June 2016 Cluj-Napoca Mayor election results
Parties and alliances	Candidate	Votes	%
**National Liberal Party (Partidul Național Liberal)**	Emil Boc	**64,311**	**64.76**
Democratic Alliance of Hungarians in Romania (Uniunea Democrată Maghiară din România)	Horváth Anna	12,573	12.66
Independent	Octavian Buzoianu	8,721	8.78
Liberal Movement Party (Partidul Mișcarea Liberală)	Alexa Doru Liviu Alin	3,496	3.52
Romanian Social Party (Partidul Social Românesc)	Mircia Giurgiu	3,184	3.20
Democratic Christian Union Party of Romania (Partidul Uniunea Creștin Democrată din România)	David Ilie	2,119	2.13
Humanist Power Party (Partidul Puterii Umaniste)	Bruno Roschnafsky	1,776	1.78
People's Movement Party (Partidul Mișcarea Populară)	Adrian Gurzău	1,289	1.29
M10 Party (Partidul M10)	Maria Irina Pop	1,253	1.26
Hungarian People's Party of Transylvania (Partidul Popular Maghiar din Transilvania)	Fancsali Ernő	574	0.57
Total (turnout %) Autoritatea Electorală Permanentă - Alegerile locale 2016		99,296	100
