= List of mayors of Cluj-Napoca =

Mayor of Cluj-Napoca
- Romanian: Primarul Municipiului Cluj-Napoca
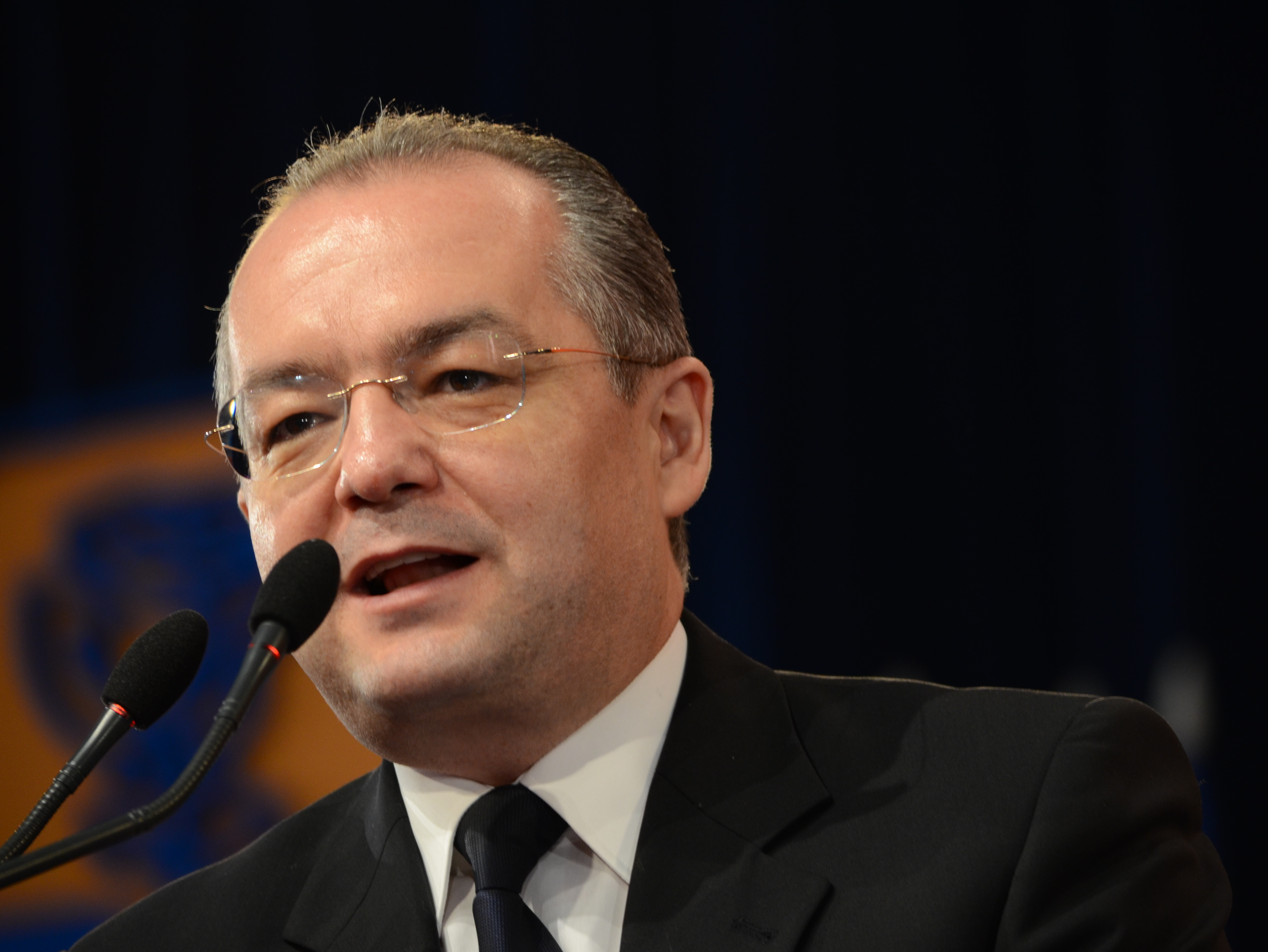
- Incumbent; Dr. Emil Boc since July 2012
- Inaugural holder: Dr. Iulian Pop
- Formation: 1919 (after the Unification of Romania)
- Website: www.primariaclujnapoca.ro

#	Name	Portrait	Born-Died	Election	Took office	Left office	Party
Principality of Transylvania
	József Pataki				April 1861	?	
Austro-Hungarian Empire
	Zsigmond Szentkirályi				1 September 1867	1868	
	Kálmán Esterházy				1868	1874	
	Elek Simon				1 February 1874	1 September 1880	
	Károly Haller				1 August 1884	1 May 1886	
	Géza Albach				1 May 1886	30 June 1898	
	Géza Szvacsina				1 July 1898	30 November 1913	
	Gusztáv Haller				1 December 1913	19 January 1919	
Kingdom of Romania
1	Iulian Pop				19 January 1919	April 1923	
—	Aurel Moga				April 1923	April 1923	
2	Octavian Utalea				1 May 1923	14 March 1926	
3	Theodor Mihali				21 April 1926	21 October 1926	
4	Vasile Osvadă				21 October 1926	23 June 1927	
(3)	Theodor Mihali				23 June 1927	24 July 1931	
5	Prof. Coriolan Tătaru				24 July 1931	31 January 1932	
6	Dr. Sebastian Bornemisa				1 February 1932	11 June 1932	
7	Dr. Victor Deleu				11 June 1932	18 November 1933	
8	Prof. Dr. Nicolae Drăganu				18 November 1933	1 January 1938	
9	Dr. Laurian Gabor				1 January 1938	13 February 1938	
10	Richard Filipescu				17 February 1938	23 September 1938	
(6)	Dr. Sebastian Bornemisa				23 September 1938	September 1940	
Kingdom of Hungary (Vienna awards)
	Dr. Vasarhelyi Lászlo				September 1940	16 April 1941	
	Keledy Tibor				16 April 1941	1944	
Kingdom of Romania (restored)
11	Dr. Ioan Demeter				1944	1944	
12	Tudor Bugnariu				1944	1945	
13	Gheorghe Chintezanu				1944	1947	
Communist Romania
(13)	Gheorghe Chintezanu				1947	1952	
14	Petre Jurca				1952	1957	
15	Aurel Duca				1956	1960	
16	Gheorghe Lăpădeanu				1960	1968	
17	Remus Bucșa				1968	1975	
18	Constantin Crișan				1975	1983	
19	Constantin Chirilă				1983	1985	
20	Nicolae Preda				1985	1986	
21	Gheorghe Cordea				1986	1989	
Romania
22	Ion Pop				1989	1990	
23	Alexandru Șerban				1990	1990	
24	Mihai Tălpean				1990	1991	
25	Teodor Groza				1991	1992	
26	Gheorghe Funar			1992	1992	June 2004	PUNR
26	Gheorghe Funar			1996	1992	June 2004	PUNR/PRM
26	Gheorghe Funar			2000	1992	June 2004	PRM
27	Emil Boc			2004	June 2004	December 2008	PD/PD-L
27	Emil Boc			2008	June 2004	December 2008	PD/PD-L
28	Sorin Apostu			—	December 2008	November 2011	PD-L
28	Sorin Apostu			2009	December 2008	November 2011	PD-L
—	Radu Moisin			—	November 2011	22 June 2012	PD-L
(27)	Emil Boc			2012	22 June 2012		PD-L/PNL
(27)	Emil Boc			2016	22 June 2012		PNL
(27)	Emil Boc			2020	22 June 2012		PNL
