= Văcăroiu cabinet =

Romanian government cabinet

Văcăroiu I
- 111th Cabinet of Romania

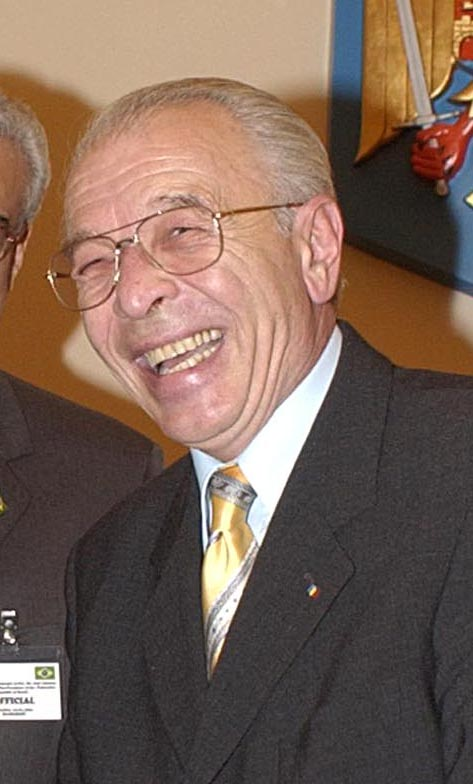
- Date formed: 19 November 1992
- Date dissolved: 11 December 1996

People and organisations
- Head of state: Ion Iliescu
- Head of government: Nicolae Văcăroiu
- Member party: FDSN/PDSR
- Status in legislature: Supported by a legislative coalition

History
- Election: 27 September 1992
- Outgoing election: 26 November 1996
- Legislature term: 1992–1996
- Budget: Four
- Predecessor: Stolojan
- Successor: Ciorbea

The Văcăroiu Cabinet was the 111th cabinet of Romania between 1992 and 1996, led by Nicolae Văcăroiu. After the 1992 general elections, when FDSN obtained 27.75% of the votes in the Chamber of Deputies, and 28.31% in the Senate, the reelected President, Ion Iliescu, nominated in November 1992 Nicolae Văcăroiu as Prime Minister of a minority cabinet formed by FDSN.

The Văcăroiu Cabinet was supported in the Romanian parliament by a legislative coalition called ”the Red Quadrilateral” between FDSN, PRM (Partidul România Mare, the Great Romania Party), PUNR (Partidul Unității Naționale a Românilor, the National Unity of Romanians Party), PDAR (Partidul Democrației Agrare din România, the Agrarian Democracy from Romania Party), and PSM (Partidul Socialist al Muncii, the Socialist Party of Labour).

== Membership ==
Văcăroiu Cabinet was a minority cabinet formed by members of the FDSN/PDSR, and Independent ministers

Prime Minister:

- Nicolae Văcăroiu (Note: Joined PDSR in May 1996)

=== Ministers of State ===
- Mișu Negrițoiu/Mircea Coșea
- Dan Mircea Popescu
- Teodor Meleșcanu
- Florin Georgescu

=== Ministers ===
- Petre Ninosu/Gavril Iosif Chiuzbaian/Ion Predescu (Justice)
- Florin Georgescu (Finance)
- Niculae Spiroiu/Gheorghe Tinca (Defense)
- Mihai Golu/Liviu Maior/Marin Sorescu/Viorel Mărgineanu/Grigore Zanc (Culture and Arts)
- Ioan Oancea/Valeriu Tabără/Alexandru Lăpușan (Agriculture)
- Teodor Meleșcanu (Foreign Affairs)
- Marin Cristea (Public Works)
- Constantin Teculescu/Cristian Ionescu/Petru Crișan/Dan Ioan Popescu (Commerce)
- George Ioan Dănescu/Doru Ioan Tărăcilă (Interior)
- Liviu Maior (Education)
- Aurel-Constantin Ilie (Environment)
- Dan Mircea Popescu (Labor)
- Paul Teodoru/Aurel Novac (Transport)
- Iulian Mincu/Daniela Bartoș (Health)
- Andrei Chirică/Adrian Turicu/Mircea Coșea (Communication)
- Dumitru Popescu/Alexandru Stănescu (Industries)
- Matei-Agathon Dan (Tourism)
- Doru Dumitru Palade/Valer Dorneanu/Petre Ninosu (Research and Technology)
- Gheorghe Angelescu/Alexandru Mironov (Youth and Sport)
