= Alexandru Lăpușan =

Romanian politician (1955–2016)

Minister of Agriculture and Rural Development
- In office 1992–1996
- Preceded by: Valeriu Tabără
- Succeeded by: Dinu Gavrilescu

Personal details
- Born: 1 February 1955 Țăndărei, Ialomița County, Romania
- Died: 17 May 2016 (aged 61)
- Party: National Salvation Front
- Education: Bucharest Academy of Economic Studies
- Occupation: Politician
- Profession: Engineer

Alexandru Lăpușan (1 February 1955 – 17 May 2016) was a Romanian politician who served as Minister of Agriculture in Nicolae Văcăroiu's Cabinet (1992–1996). He was member of the Chamber of Deputies (1990–1992) for Cluj County, being named by the National Salvation Front. He was also Mayor of Dej in 1991.
