= Apostu =

Apostu is a Romanian surname. Notable people with the surname include:

- Bogdan Apostu (born 1982), Romanian footballer
- Sorin Apostu (born 1968), Romanian politician
