= Szolcsva =

Szolcsva is the Hungarian name for two places in Romania:

- Sălciua Commune, Alba County
- Sălciva village, Zam Commune, Hunedoara County
