= Gheorghe Funar =

Romanian politician

Member of the Senate of Romania
- In office 13 December 2004 – 14 December 2008
- Constituency: Cluj County

Mayor of Cluj-Napoca
- In office February 1992 – June 2004
- Preceded by: Teodor Groza
- Succeeded by: Emil Boc

Leader of the Romanian National Unity Party
- In office 17 October 1992 – 22 March 1997
- Preceded by: Constantin Ivasiuc
- Succeeded by: Valeriu Tabără

Personal details
- Born: 29 September 1949 (age 77) Sânnicolau Mare, Timiș County, Romanian People's Republic
- Party: Greater Romania Party
- Other political affiliations: Romanian Communist Party (before 1989); Romanian National Unity Party (1990–1997)
- Education: Babeș-Bolyai University
- Occupation: Economist

Gheorghe Funar (Note: Romanian pronunciation: [ˈɡe̯orɡe ˈfunar]) (born September 29, 1949, in Sânnicolau Mare, Timiș County, Socialist Republic of Romania) is a nationalist Romanian politician, who rose to fame as a controversial mayor of Cluj-Napoca between 1992 and 2004.

== Biography ==
He became well known for his very strong nationalist stance favouring ethnic Romanians in Cluj-Napoca, which is a relatively multi-ethnic city with an increasing ethnic Romanian majority (80.8%) and a significant ethnic Hungarian population (17.1%). Other ethnic groups include Romani and Germans (more specifically Transylvanian Saxons). Cluj-Napoca is considered to be the major city of Transylvania, a historical region with a significant Hungarian minority.

Funar was a candidate for the presidency for the Romanian National Unity Party (PUNR) in 1992 and 1996. In 1997, after he was expelled from PUNR, he joined the far-right Greater Romania Party (PRM).

Funar served as mayor of Cluj-Napoca from 1992 to 2004, when he was defeated in the first round of the mayoral election. Emil Boc of the Justice and Truth Alliance (DA) won in the second round run-off against Social Democratic Party (PSD) candidate Ioan Rus. Funar ran again in 2008, coming in fourth with 4.2% of the vote.

Previously, Funar was also the General Secretary of the Greater Romania Party (PRM). Among his proposals in parliament are the distribution of Romanian-language Bibles to all citizens and the raising of a statue of Mihai Eminescu in every commune.

He is married to Sabina Funar, a professor at the University of Agricultural Sciences and Veterinary Medicine in Cluj-Napoca.

== Mayorship of Cluj-Napoca ==
While many voters said that they voted for him only due to his economic policies, Funar's views demonstrated that tensions over Transylvania's ethnic identity continued after the end of communism in Romania in 1989 and more than seventy years after Transylvania became part of Romania. His views were often manifested in public policy. Among his measures seen by many as an affront to the ethnic Hungarian community, Funar asked the municipality to paint many public items—including park benches, pavements and even garbage bins—in the colors of the Romanian flag (blue, yellow and red). At Christmas time, the municipality was allowed to use only red, yellow and blue Christmas lights.

In 1993, the city's central plaza, "Piața Libertății" (Liberty Square), was renamed "Piața Unirii" (Unification Square), to call to mind the 1918 Union of Transylvania with Romania. Funar changed the label of the statue of Matthias Corvinus from Matthias Rex Hungarorum (Matthias King of Hungarians) to just Matthias Rex. In September 1996, when Romania signed a friendship treaty with Hungary, Funar organized a funeral ceremony in the streets of Cluj-Napoca. In 1997, he hung a banner in front of the Hungarian Consulate in Cluj saying "This is the seat of the Hungarian spies in Romania". Many of Funar's changes were reversed under the mayorship of his successor, Emil Boc.

Between 1992 and 1993, Funar supported a large-scale Ponzi scheme run by Caritas, a company based in Cluj-Napoca. Funar helped Caritas build its credibility by renting space for it in the town hall, appearing with its owner in public and on television, and defending the company from attacks. Funar also gave Caritas space in the local newspaper to list winners' names (amounting to 44 pages in 1993) and lent the owner space at the local stadium to run his operations.

Recently, Funar extended his xenophobic views to the Jewish minority, making unfounded statements: "The World's Jewish Government wants to move Israel into Romanian borders and is trying to exterminate Romanian people by using food additives" or "There are already more than 2 million Jews in Romania working for its destruction". He also claims that the theory of relativity was developed by the Romanian poet Mihai Eminescu and subsequently stolen by Albert Einstein (described by Funar as a "retarded individual").

== Electoral history ==
=== Presidential elections ===
Election	Affiliation	First round			Second round		
Election	Affiliation	Votes	Percentage	Position	Votes	Percentage	Position
1992	PUNR	1,294,388	10.8%	3rd			
1996	PUNR	407,828	3.2%	6th			
2014	Independent	45,405	0.47%	9th			

== See also ==
- List of mayors of Cluj-Napoca
