= Miguel Esterházy =

Count Miguel Esterházy de Galántha
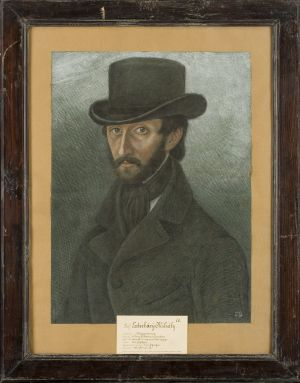
- Born: May 28, 1825; Kolozsvár, Grand Principality of Transylvania, Austrian Empire
- Died: August 24, 1923 (aged 98) Cluj, Kingdom of Romania
- Buried: Hajongard Cemetery
- Allegiance: Hungarian Revolutionary Army
- Service years: 1848–1849
- Rank: Captain

Count Miguel (Mihály) Esterházy de Galántha (28 May 1825 – 24 August 1923) was a Hungarian nobleman and 1848 honvéd captain.

== Life ==
A member of the Esterházy family, he received his exotic given name after his godfather, Don Miguel of Braganza, the later King of Portugal. His brother was the future mayor of Kolozsvár Kálmán Esterházy. He completed his studies in Kolozsvár, then served as a cadet in the Hardegg Cuirassier Regiment, and later as a lieutenant in the Alexander Hussar Regiment.

During the 1848–49 War of Independence, he participated in the campaigns throughout with the army of Artúr Görgei. He was the commander of the rearguard unit that brilliantly covered the retreat of József Nagysándor's corps after the Battle of Debrecen.

Following the defeat of the war of independence, he was sentenced to ten years (sixteen years according to other sources) of fortress imprisonment, which he was ordered to serve in the Arad fortress. He was released by pardon in 1851. He then worked as a lawyer, while also serving in the County Council of the Kolozs County between 1867 and 1890.

He never married and never had children. His grave is located in the Házsongárd cemetery; his tombstone reads: "Captain of the Sándor Hussars, '48 honvéd officer, hero of freedom, prisoner of ARAD".
