= Mihai Iosif =

Romanian footballer and manager

Personal information
- Date of birth: 22 October 1974 (age 52)
- Place of birth: Bucharest, Romania
- Height: 1.75 m (5 ft 9 in)
- Position: Midfielder

Team information
- Current team: ASA Târgu Mureș (head coach)

Youth career
- 1982–1989: Rapid București

Senior career*
Years	Team	Apps	(Gls)
1989–1995	Rapid București		
1995–1996	Dinamo București		
1996	→ Chindia Târgoviște (loan)		
1996–1998	Chindia Târgoviște		
1998–1999	Drobeta-Turnu Severin		

Managerial career
- 2016–2017: AFC Rapid
- 2017–2019: Rapid București U19
- 2019: Rapid București (technical director)
- 2020: Rapid II București (assistant)
- 2020: Rapid II București
- 2020: Rapid București (caretaker)
- 2020–2021: Rapid București (assistant)
- 2021–2022: Rapid București
- 2022–2023: Minaur Baia Mare
- 2024: ACS FC Dinamo
- 2025: Voluntari
- 2026: Dunărea Călărași
- 2026–: ASA Târgu Mureș
- * Club domestic league appearances and goals

Mihai "Miță" Iosif (born 22 October 1974) is a Romanian professional football manager and former player, currently in charge of Liga II club ASA Târgu Mureș.

== Playing career ==
Mihai Iosif started his football career at Rapid București, in 1982, club that in years to come will remain in his soul and where he will return as manager as well. Iosif made his debut in the second tier in 1989, at only 15 years old, in a defeat (0–2) against Tractorul Brașov. In the top-flight (Divizia A), Iosif made his debut for the same club, in 1992, in a match against FC Universitatea Craiova. Between his debut in the second tier and the debut in the top tier (1989–1992), he played mostly for Rapid U19 team and also for Romanian youth national teams.

In 1995, Iosif was sold to Rapid's rival, Dinamo București, but after a short period he and his teammate, Irinel Voicu entered in a transfer between Dinamo and Divizia B side, Chindia Târgoviște. The transfer consisted of an exchange, Iosif and Voicu for Cătălin Hîldan and Cezar Dinu. Iosif remarked years later that both of the players (Hîldan and Dinu) died tragically, when they were still young.

Between 1996 and 1998 he was part of the golden generation of Chindia, team that was nicknamed at the time as "the Little Ajax". Iosif played in the Divizia B and Divizia A for the team situated under Chindia Tower, then moved to FC Drobeta-Turnu Severin.

In 1999, Iosif decided to retire from football after he suffered from almost permanently vertigo, affection that will torment him for no less than two years.

== Manager career ==
Mihai Iosif started his manager career in 2016 at AFC Rapid (a club detached from Rapid București) then in 2017 moved to Rapid București, out of a desire to help his favourite club to return in the top-flight (after a bankruptcy and a relegation in the county leagues). In this years Iosif was the manager, assistant manager, caretaker manager of the first and second teams of Rapid. In 2021, his dream came true, Rapid București promoted back in the Liga I with Iosif as a manager, he began to cry with joy immediately after the promotion match against FC U Craiova. He was sacked on 2 March 2022 following a 3:2 away defeat to U Craiova 1948, which left Rapid sitting 9th with 2 wins in 15 games.

== Doping scandal ==
In 2009, Iosif gave an interview for Gazeta Sporturilor in which he gave his thoughts on his stay at Chindia Târgoviște, a period he claims that ended his career and put his life in danger. Iosif hinted there was a link between doping used during the 1990s and the deaths of the two players, Cătălin Hîldan and Ștefan Vrăbioru. Hîldan also played for Chindia in that period, Iosif and Hîldan were at that time part of a player exchange between Dinamo and the team based in Târgoviște.

"In the training camp before the match, pills. Many, 10-12 at a time, at each meal. Multicolored and anonymous. At Rapid and Dinamo we took all kinds of reinforcements, but I knew what I was putting in my mouth. Not here! Why didn't I ask? Out of stupidity, I was a restless kid. Then, before the games, the tea in which Silaghi passed and put a few drops from a vial: "Aaa, Efe has come!", The oldest members of the team made fun. They knew or suspected that they were being given ephedrine: "I felt more alive, I had false energy. Years later, after I got rid of my health problems, I thought about them. I don't want to offend anyone, to hurt their families, but I was convinced that I had to go through their destiny."

Vasile Silaghi, assistant manager of Chindia in that period denied everything: "Stories, sir! How come nothing came out at 15-20 checks as many as we were given? The pill under the tongue is Placebo, it induces a condition. It was anything, Vitamin C, Scobutil (N-butylscopolammonium bromide), just to make them think that all will be good. My story was that I also had some schooling, I was a smart boy and those who only knew how to play football commented to me."

== Personal life ==
His son, Sabin Iosif (born 26 October 2001), was also a footballer. Sabin also played for Lucchese and ASU Politehnica Timișoara. His uncle, Ion Pop, was also a footballer who played at Rapid București.

== Honours ==
=== Player ===
Rapid București

- Divizia B: 1989–90
- Cupa României runner-up: 1994–95
- Cupa Ligii: 1994

Chindia Târgoviște

- Divizia B: 1995–96

=== Coach ===
Individual

- Gazeta Sporturilor Romania Coach of the Month: August 2021
