= Victor Deleu =

Romanian politician (1876–1939)

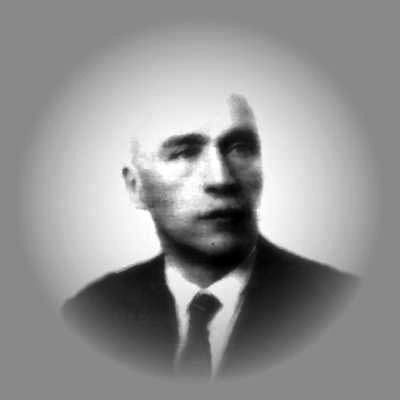

Mayor of Cluj-Napoca
- In office 11 June 1932 – 18 November 1933
- Preceded by: Sebastian Bornemisa
- Succeeded by: Nicolae Drăganu

Personal details
- Born: 25 May 1876 Szilágyperecsen, Austria-Hungary
- Died: 31 December 1939 (aged 63) Cluj, Kingdom of Romania
- Education: University of Budapest; Franz Joseph University
- Profession: Lawyer

Victor Deleu (25 May 1876 – 11 December 1939) was a politician from Romania.

Deleu was born in Szilágyperecsen, Austria-Hungary, now Pericei, Sălaj County, Romania, the son of Daniel Deleu and Iuliana Cosma. His grandfather, Iacob Deleu (1804–1880), fought alongside Avram Iancu in the Revolutions of 1848–1849. His brother, Ioan Deleu (1877–1946), participated as representative of Șimleu Silvaniei at the Great National Assembly in Alba Iulia, where the Union of Transylvania with Romania was proclaimed on 1 December 1918.

Victor Deleu attended elementary school in his native village from 1883 to 1887, and gymnasium at the Șimleu Silvaniei High School from 1887 1891. He continued his high school education in Zalău, Blaj, Brașov, and Beiuș, graduating in 1895. He then enrolled at the Faculty of Law of the University of Budapest, from where he graduated in 1900. He obtained his doctorate in law at Franz Joseph University in Cluj in 1902. After military service in the Austro-Hungarian Army in Vienna, he practiced law in Arad from 1903 to 1905. Admitted to the bar in Oradea in 1905, he moved his practice to Șimleu Silvaniei. In 1911 he married Olivia de Bardosy, a piano teacher from Sibiu.

During World War I, Deleu was a member of the Romanian Volunteer Corps in Russia. He served with Gheorghe Pop de Băsești and Iuliu Maniu in the Governing Council of Transylvania during the region's provisional autonomy, until April 1920. He then served as Mayor of Cluj from 11 June 1932 to 18 November 1933.

He died in Cluj in 1939. Streets in Cluj-Napoca and Zalău are named after him.
