= Kálmán Esterházy =

Count Kálmán Esterházy de Galántha
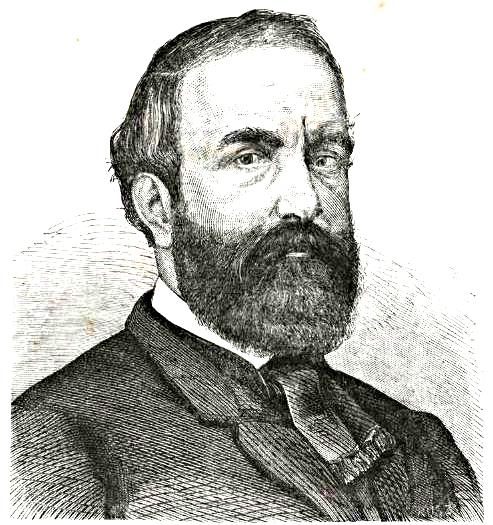

Member of the National Assembly of Hungary
- In office 27 September 1884 – 3 January 1905
- In office 27 May 1867 – 30 September 1867

Mayor of Kolozsvár
- In office 1867–1886

Member of the Diet of Transylvania
- In office 1865–1865

Personal details
- Born: June 7, 1830 Nagyiklód, Grand Principality of Transylvania, Austrian Empire (present-day Iclod, Romania)
- Died: February 9, 1916 (aged 85) Kolozsvár, Kingdom of Hungary, Austria-Hungary (present-day Cluj-Napoca, Romania)
- Citizenship: Hungarian
- Party: Deák Party; Liberal Party
- Parent(s): Count Dénes Esterházy; Countess Cecília Haller
- Relatives: Miguel Esterházy (brother)
- Education: Academy of Kolozsvár
- Occupation: Politician, military officer, landowner, natural scientist

Military service
- Branch/service: Hungarian Revolutionary Army
- Rank: Lieutenant
- Battles/wars: Hungarian Revolution of 1848

Count Kálmán Esterházy de Galántha (7 June 1830 – 9 February 1916) was a Hungarian nobleman, politician, military officer, and natural scientist. A participant in the Hungarian Revolution of 1848, he later served as a long-standing Member of Parliament, Lord Lieutenant (főispán) of Kolozs County and Kolozsvár (an equivalent to the present-day mayor of Cluj), and intendant of the National Theatre of Kolozsvár.

== Early life ==
Count Kálmán Esterházy was born on 7 June 1830 in Nagyiklód, Grand Principality of Transylvania (now Iclod, Romania), into the prominent Hungarian noble House of Esterházy. He was the son of Count Dénes Esterházy and Countess Cecília Haller. His brother, Miguel Esterházy, also participated in the Hungarian Revolution.

He completed his education in Kolozsvár (Cluj-Napoca) between 1839 and 1848. Following his studies, he was sworn in as an apprentice clerk (táblai gyakornok) at the Royal Court of Appeal (Királyi Tábla).

== Military career (1848–1849) ==
With the outbreak of the Hungarian Revolution of 1848, Esterházy interrupted his legal training, returned to Transylvania, and enlisted as a private in the newly formed Hungarian Revolutionary Army.

He rose to the rank of lieutenant in the hussars and distinguished himself for bravery across multiple engagements. During the Battle of Nagyszeben (now Sibiu), his right arm was shattered by a cannonball and had to be amputated. Due to this severe injury, he was incapacitated from further active combat and was awarded the Military Merit Cross.

== Political and public career ==
=== Passive resistance and scientific pursuits ===
Following the defeat of the Hungarian War of Independence in 1849, Esterházy withdrew from active public life to his estates. During the era of Austrian neo-absolutism, he devoted himself to estate management, agriculture, and the natural sciences, particularly geology and mineralogy.

In 1861, amidst the political re-awakening in the Habsburg Empire, Esterházy returned to public affairs. He participated in the Gyulafehérvár (Károlyfehérvár) Conference as a correspondent for Korunk, a newspaper he had initiated, and contributed reports to several newspapers in Pest. Although elected to the provincial diet (Landtag) convened at Nagyszeben, he joined the Hungarian political boycott and declined to take his seat.

=== Parliamentary career and administration ===
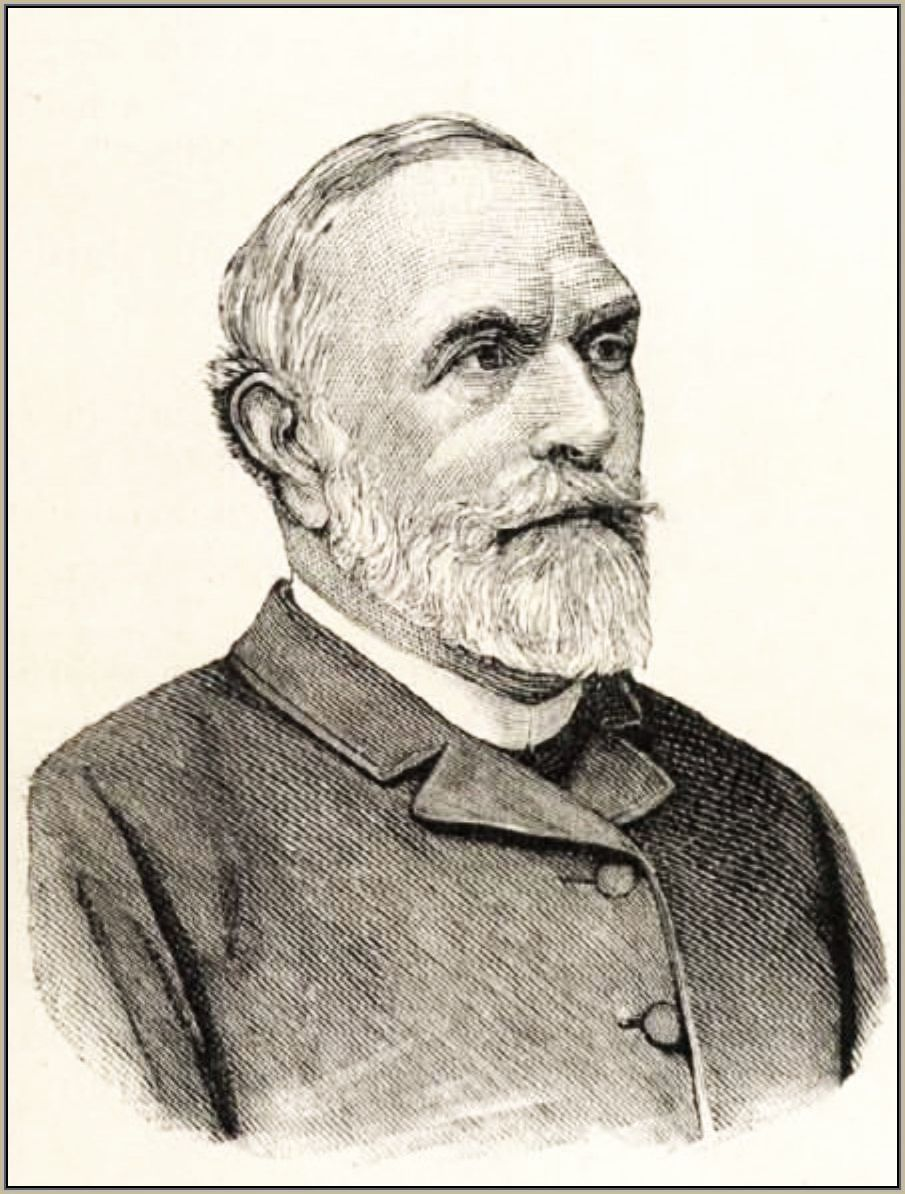
Kálmán Esterházy in 1891

In 1865, Esterházy attended the final Transylvanian Diet in Kolozsvár as a representative for Fogaras.

Following the Austro-Hungarian Compromise of 1867, which restored the Hungarian constitution and reunited Transylvania with the Kingdom of Hungary, he was elected to the Hungarian Diet in Pest representing the constituency of Kolozsvár. In parliament, he aligned with the Deák Party, led by Ferenc Deák.

In 1871, following the resignation of Baron Lajos Jósika, Esterházy was appointed Lord Lieutenant (főispán) of Kolozs County and the city of Kolozsvár. During his tenure, he also served as the intendant (director) of the National Theatre of Kolozsvár.

He was deeply involved in local scientific and cultural institutions, notably serving in leadership roles within the Transylvanian Museum Society (Erdélyi Múzeum-Egylet), where he delivered presidential addresses in 1879 and 1880.

In 1887, Esterházy returned to national politics, winning a parliamentary mandate on the platform of the governing Liberal Party. He retained his seat in the Hungarian Diet without interruption until 1910.

== Death ==
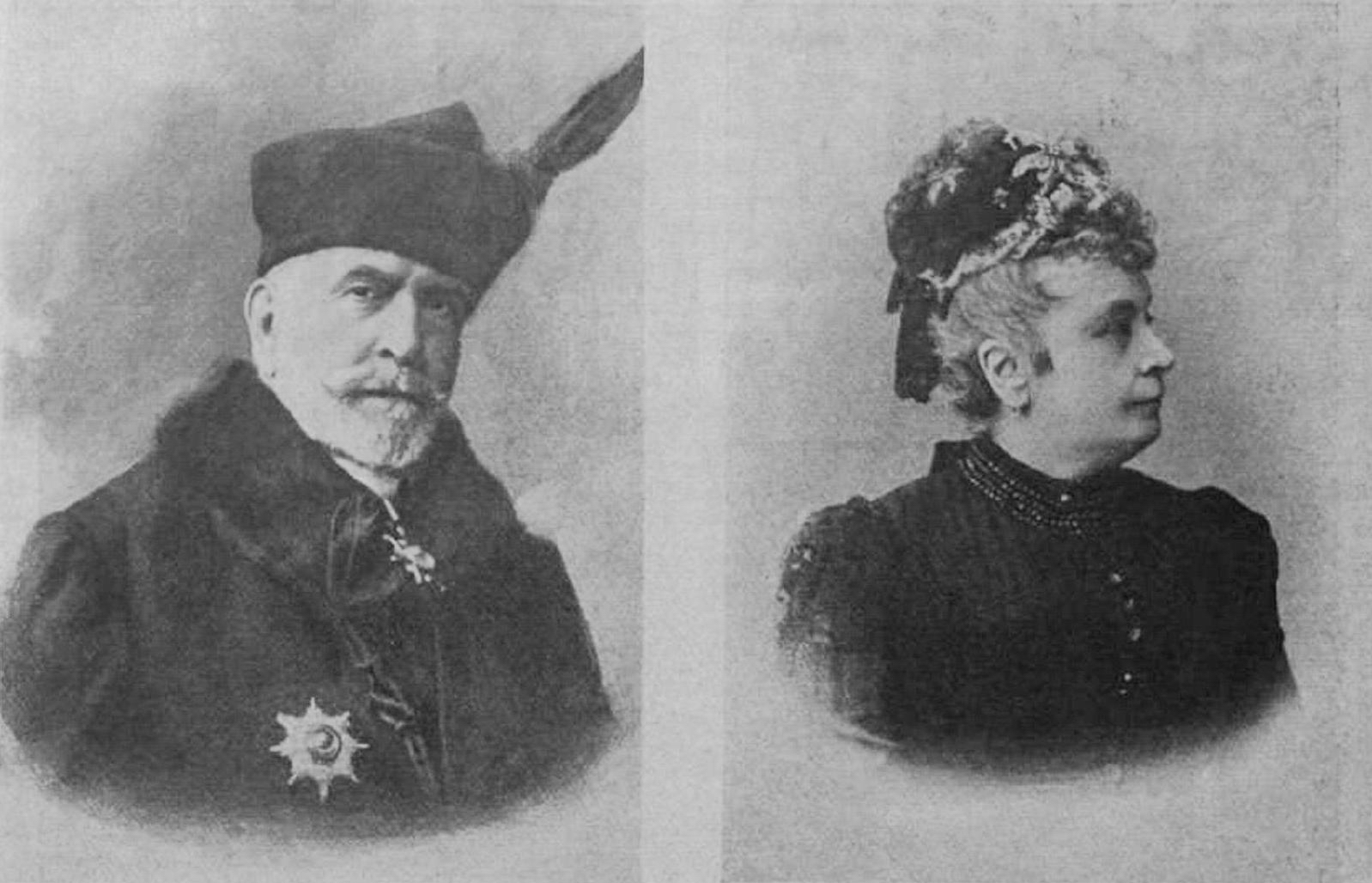
Esterházy and his wife in 1907

Count Kálmán Esterházy died on 9 February 1916 in Kolozsvár, at the age of 85.

== Selected works ==
- "Az aranynak előjövetele a Hideg-Szamos folyó alsó völgyében" [The Occurrence of Gold in the Lower Valley of the Hideg-Szamos River] (Munkálatok, Hungarian Association of Physicians and Naturalists, 1865/1870)
- "A sókról" [On Salts] (Kolozsvári Nagy Naptár, 1866)
- "A sztánai kimosási völgy és a kolozsvári medencze" [The Stâna Erosion Valley and the Kolozsvár Basin] (Munkálatok, Hungarian Association of Physicians and Naturalists, 1870)
- Presidential opening addresses in the publications of the Transylvanian Museum Society (1879–1880)
