= Sălciuța =

- Location within Romania

Location
- Country: Romania
- Counties: Alba County

Physical characteristics
- Mouth: Arieș
  - location: Sălciua de Jos
  - coordinates: 46.3949°N 23.4244°E
- Length: 13 km (8.1 mi)
- Basin size: 20 km^{2} (7.7 sq mi)

Basin features
- Progression: Arieș→ Mureș→ Tisza→ Danube→ Black Sea

The Sălciuța is a left tributary of the river Arieș in Romania. It discharges into the Arieș in Sălciua de Jos. Its length is 13 km (8.1 mi) and its basin size is 20 km^{2} (7.7 sq mi).
