= Sorin Apostu =

Romanian politician

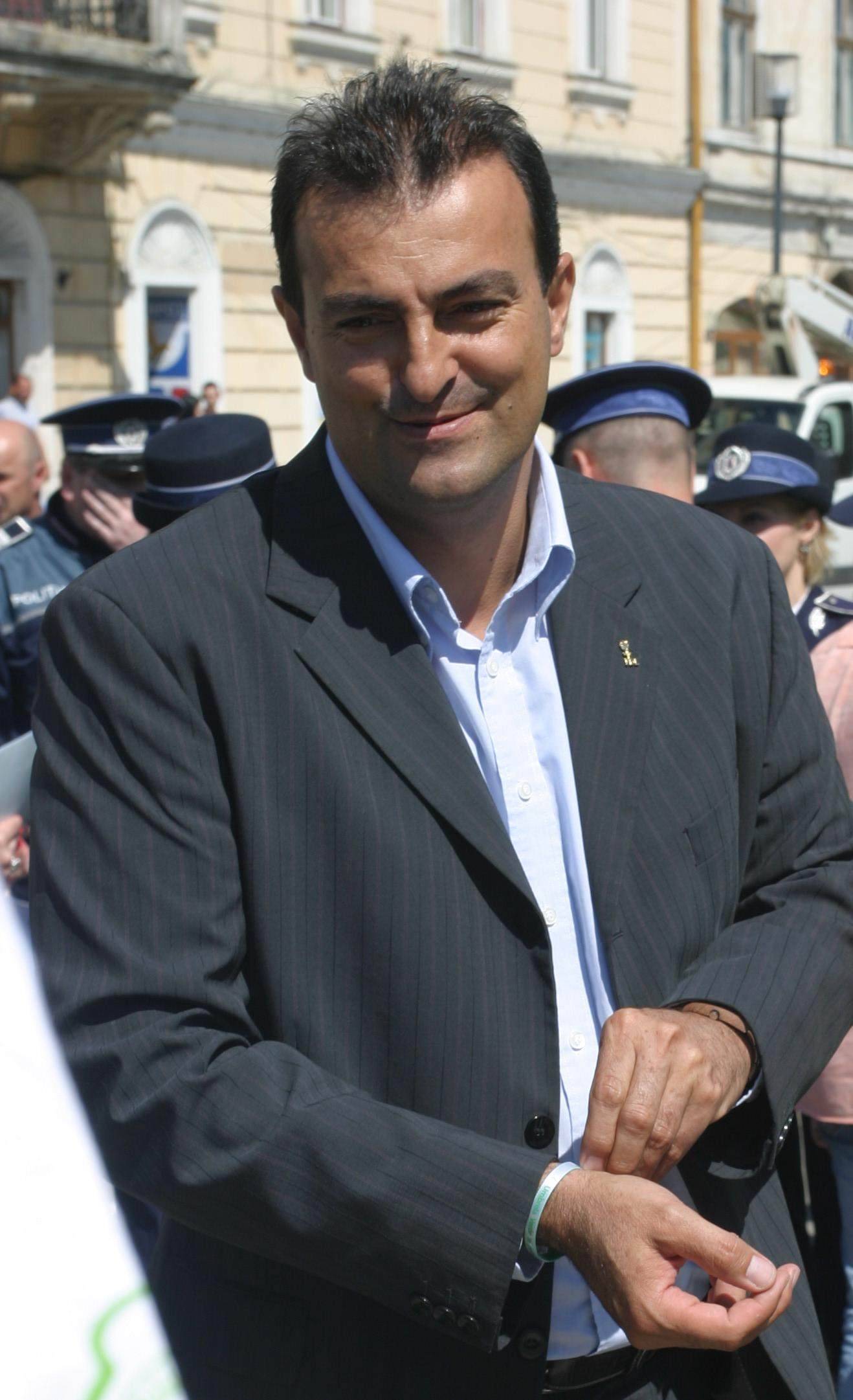

Mayor of Cluj-Napoca
- In office 22 December 2008 – 15 February 2012
- Preceded by: Emil Boc
- Succeeded by: Radu Moisin (interim)

Personal details
- Born: 8 February 1968 (age 58) Focșani, Romania
- Party: Democratic Liberal Party
- Spouse: Monica Apostu
- Children: Tudor and Alexandra
- Education: University of Agronomical Sciences and Veterinary Medicine

Sorin Apostu (born 8 February 1968) is a Romanian politician. A member of the Democratic Liberal Party, he was the mayor of Cluj-Napoca from December 2008 to February 2012, when he resigned while arrested in the midst of a corruption scandal.

== Biography ==
Apostu was born in Focșani and attended the University of Agronomical Sciences and Veterinary Medicine.

On 7 July 2014 he was convicted and sentenced to 4 months for receiving bribes from businessman Călin Stoia, to 3 months and 6 months for complicity in money laundering and 8 months for forgery. His sentences were merged into a 4 years and 6 months sentence.

== Political activity ==
In 2000 he started his political career and became the member of the Democratic Party. Emil Boc discovered him. At the local elections in 2004, he was elected as local counselor of the Cluj Napoca muni following the list of the Democratic Party. He resigned shortly from the position of the local counselor and took over the position of the direction of the Technical Department within the Cluj-Napoca Mayor-Office. In 2008, he again became a candidate for the position of the local counselor this time from the lists of the Democratic and Liberal Party. He was elected the local counselor of the Cluj Napoca muni and then, in June 2008, became the deputy mayor of the town. Then, in January 2009, he was elected as an acting mayor after the resignation of the mayor Emil Boc and on February 15, 2009, the Liberal Democratic Party designated him as a candidate for the position of mayor at the partial local elections. He won the elections in the first round with 60, 48% of votes.

== See also ==
- List of corruption scandals in Romania
- Politics of Cluj-Napoca

Preceded by Emil Boc	Mayor of Cluj-Napoca; 2009-2012	Succeeded by Radu Moisin (interim)
