= Sălciua =

- Commune
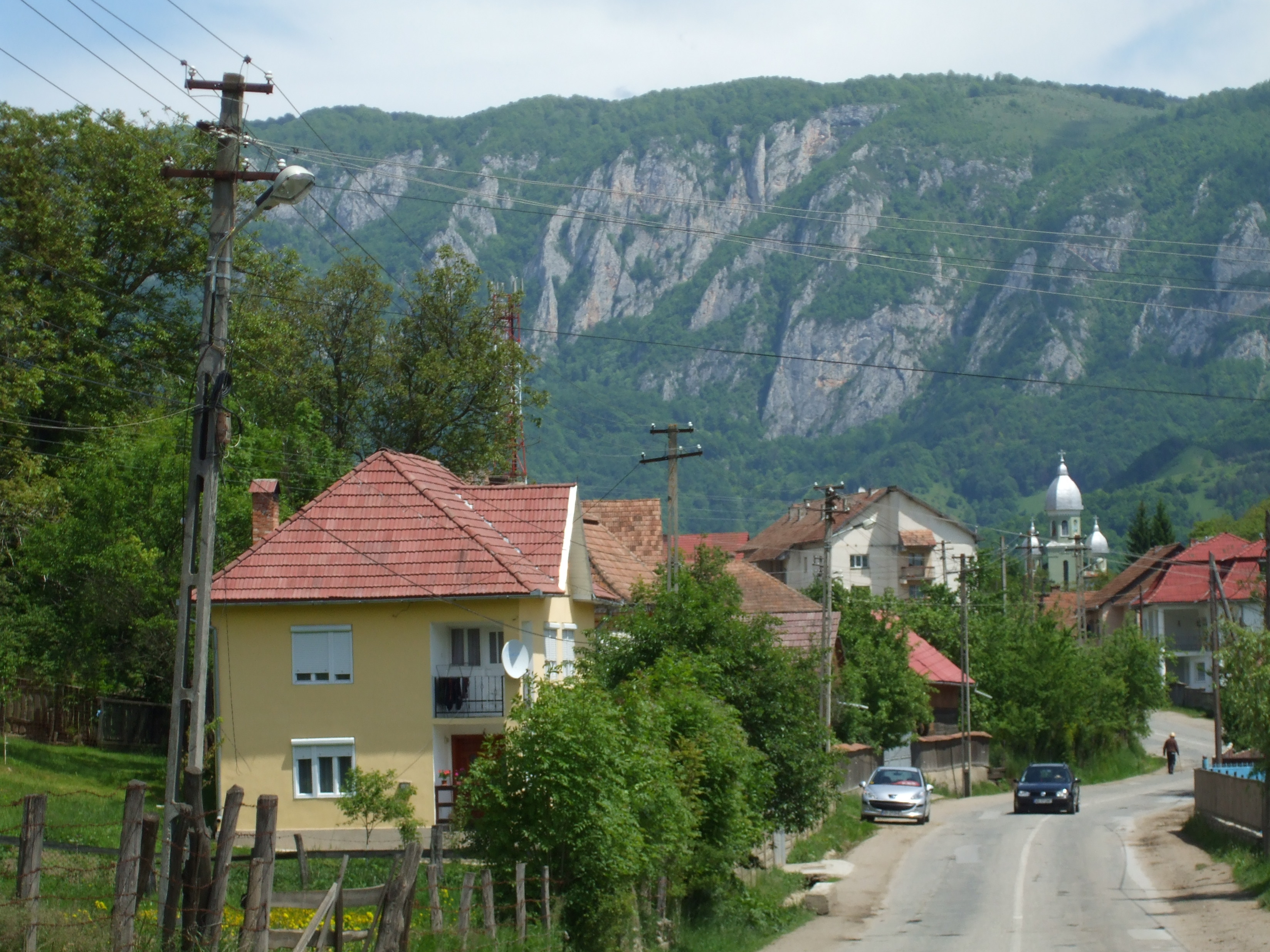
- View of Sălciua

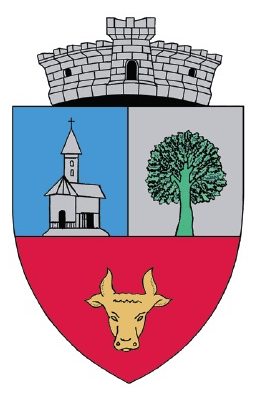
- Coat of arms

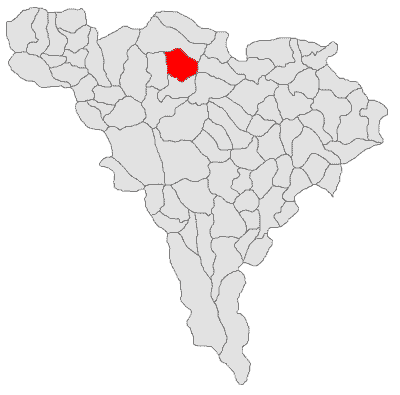
- Location in Alba County

- Location in Romania
- Coordinates: 46°24′N 23°25′E
- Country: Romania
- County: Alba

Government
  - Mayor (2020–2024): Vasile Lombrea (PNL)
- Area: 75.26 km^{2} (29.06 sq mi)
- Elevation: 528 m (1,732 ft)
- Population (2021-12-01): 1,271
  - Density: 16.89/km^{2} (43.74/sq mi)
- Time zone: UTC+02:00 (EET)
  - Summer (DST): UTC+03:00 (EEST)
- Postal code: 517645
- Area code: +40 x58
- Vehicle reg.: AB
- Website: comunasalciua.ro

Sălciua (Hungarian: Szolcsva; German: Sundorf) is a commune located in Alba County, Transylvania, Romania. It is composed of six villages: Dealu Caselor (Hegyik), Dumești, Sălciua de Jos (the commune center; Alsószolcsva), Sălciua de Sus (Felsőszolcsva), Sub Piatră (Búvópatak), and Valea Largă (Malompataka). It has a population of 1,271 as of 2021.

== Geography ==
The commune is located the ethnogeographical region of Țara Moților, in the middle of the Apuseni Mountains. It is situated in the north of Alba County, 100 km (62 mi) from the county seat, Alba Iulia, and 15 km (9.3 mi) from Baia de Arieș, the nearest town, close to the national road DN75 joining Câmpeni to Turda.

Lying on the banks of the Arieș River and its tributary, the Sălciuța, in between the Trascău Mountains and Muntele Mare, Sălciua has a specific mountain landscape developed on limestone and crystalline schists. The altitude of the surrounding mountains varies between 700 and 1,400 m (2,300 and 4,600 ft). The big Arieș meadow offers favorable conditions for agriculture, the large crop fields leading to the area being named the "Bărăgan of the Apuseni Mountains".

The great variety of karst topography, with its spectacular flora and fauna and climatic characteristics make it a big tourist attraction. The village also has historic wooden churches.

== History ==
In 1925, a few Romanian families were relocated in Banat, where they founded Sălciua Nouă village (the New Sălciua), now part of Pișchia commune, in Timiș County.

== Sights ==
- "Sfânta Cuvioasă Parascheva" wooden church (1798), in Sub Piatră village.
- "Sfânta Treime" and "Sfântul Ilie" wooden churches (1782), in Valea Largă village.
- Huda lui Păpară cave.
- Poarta Zmeilor (Gate of Dragons) cave, in Sub Piatră village.
- Vânătările Ponorului natural reservation, in Dumești village.
- Scărița–Șesul Craiului natural reservation.
- Detunatele" (the Roar) geological reservation.

Historical population
Year	Pop.	±%
2002	1,785	—
2011	1,428	−20.0%
2021	1,271	−11.0%
Source: INS, Census data

== Natives ==
- Valer Butura (1910-1979), ethnographer, writer
- Valeriu Tabără (1949–2025), agronomist and politician
