= 2008 Romanian local elections =

Local elections were held in Romania on 1 June 2008, with a runoff for mayors on 15 June 2008.

On 1 June elections were held for:

- all the villages, communes, cities, and municipal councils (Local Councils, Romanian: Consilii Locale), and the Sectors Local Councils of Bucharest (Romanian: Consilii Locale de Sector)
- the 41 County Councils (Romanian: Consilii Județene), and the Bucharest Municipal General Council (Romanian: Consiliul General Al Municipiului București).
- the 41 Presidents of the County Councils (Romanian: Președinții Consiliilor Județene)
- all the mayors (Romanian: Primarii)
  - of the villages, cities, and municipalities
  - of the Sectors of Bucharest (Romanian: Primarii de Sector)
  - The General Mayor of The Municipality of Bucharest (Romanian: Primarul General al Municipiului București)

On 17 April 2008, the Social Democratic Party (PSD) and the Conservative Party (PC) announced they would form a political alliance for these elections, the Alliance PSD+PC. For the first time the presidents of the County Councils were elected directly by the people, and not by later negotiations inside the County Council; other notable characteristics included a substantial number of Roma candidates standing, as well as some representatives of the Romanian Orthodox Church. Turnout was low, with fewer than half of the eligible voters turning out to vote; in most big cities, except for Constanța (incumbent PSD member Radu Mazăre won) and Cluj-Napoca (incumbent Democratic Liberal Party member Emil Boc won), the election was not decided in the first round; in Bucharest, PDL member Vasile Blaga and independent Sorin Oprescu (former member of the PSD) will meet in the run-off.

Overall, PDL got 28.37%, PSD got 28.04%, PNL got 18.66%, and UDMR/RMDSZ got 5.43% of the cast votes.

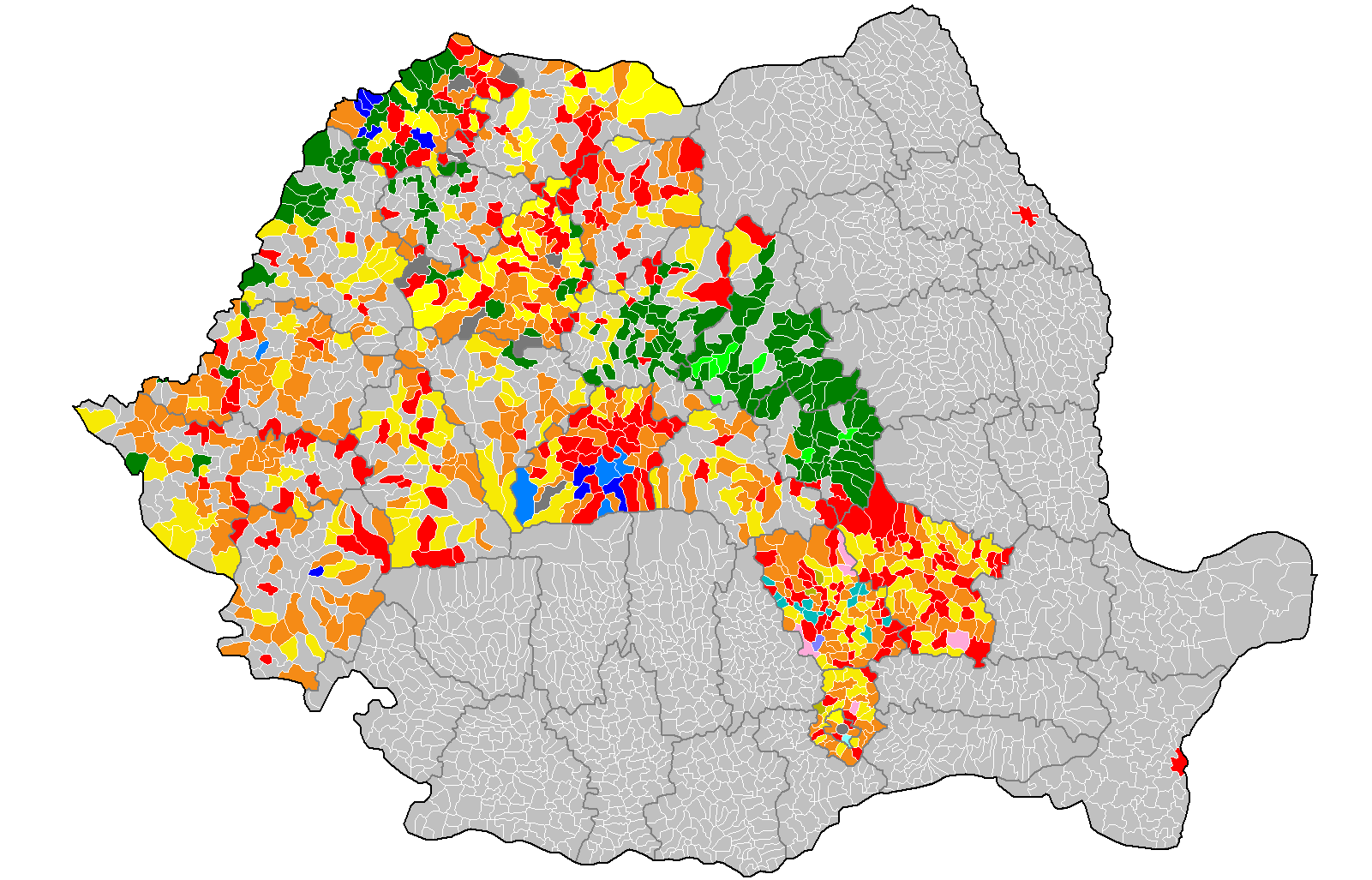
Incomplete map of the results for the Mayors Social Democratic Party (PSD) Democratic Liberal Party (PDL) National Liberal Party (PNL) Democratic Union of Hungarians in Romania (UDMR/RMDSZ) Conservative Party (PC) Greater Romania Party (PRM) Democratic Forum of Germans in Romania (FDGR/DFDR) Independent Drawing not finished

== First round ==
=== Mayors ===
The distribution of the mayor seats after the first round was as follows: Social Democratic Party (PSD) Democratic Liberal Party (PDL) National Liberal Party (PNL) Other political parties To be decided in the runoff

The most notables victories of the election ("Top 10") are listed below:

Name	Political Party	City	Percentage
Klaus Iohannis	FDGR/DFDR	Sibiu	83.2%
Florin Cârciumaru	PSD	Târgu Jiu	82.5%
Darius Vâlcov	PDL	Slatina	81.07%
Gheorghe Ştefan	PDL	Piatra Neamț	79.3%
Liviu Negoiță	PDL	Sector 3 (Bucharest)	79.0%
Constantin Hogea	PDL	Tulcea	73.4%
Tudor Pendiuc	PSD	Piteşti	72.0%
Emil Boc	PDL	Cluj-Napoca	70.2%
George Scripcaru	PDL	Braşov	69.8%
Radu Mazăre	PSD	Constanţa	67.9%
Gheorghe Falcă	PDL	Arad	67.6%

=== Local Councils ===
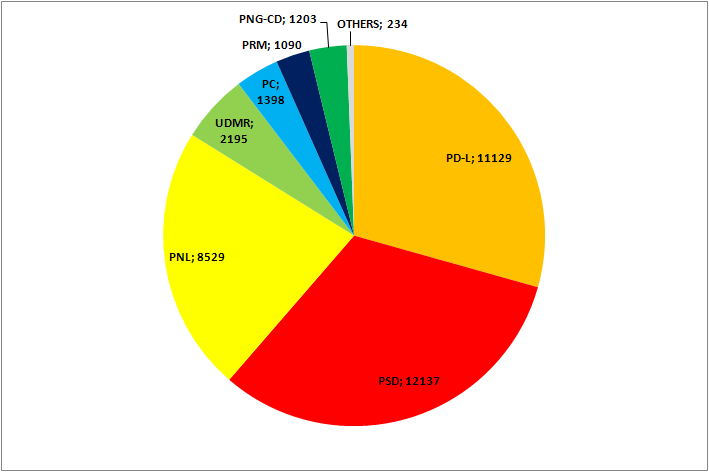
The distribution of the 37,915 Local Council seats Social Democratic Party (PSD) Democratic Liberal Party (PDL) National Liberal Party (PNL) Democratic Union of Hungarians in Romania (UDMR/RMDSZ) Conservative Party (PC) Democratic Forum of Germans in Romania (FDGR/DFDR) Other parties/Independent

=== County Council Presidents ===
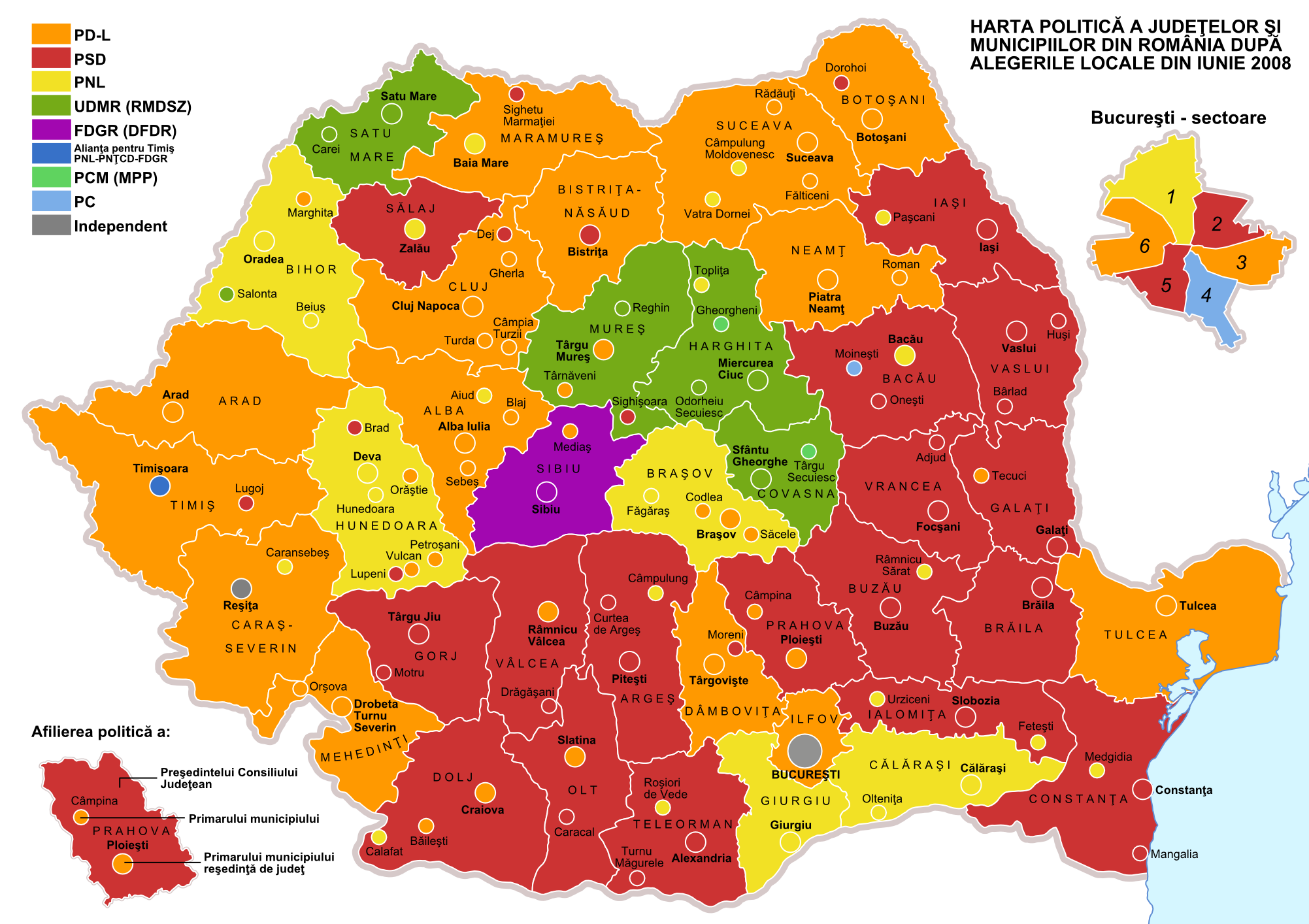
Map of the Romanian counties based on the party of the president of the County Council Social Democratic Party (PSD) Democratic Liberal Party (PDL) National Liberal Party (PNL) Democratic Union of Hungarians in Romania (UDMR/RMDSZ) Democratic Forum of Germans in Romania (FDGR/DFDR)

The distribution of the 41 County Council Presidents Social Democratic Party (PSD) Democratic Liberal Party (PDL) National Liberal Party (PNL) Democratic Union of Hungarians in Romania (UDMR/RMDSZ) Democratic Forum of Germans in Romania (FDGR/DFDR)

=== County Councils ===
Results of the county councilors

The distribution of the votes for the 41 County Councils Social Democratic Party (PSD) Democratic Liberal Party (PDL) National Liberal Party (PNL) Other parties

The distribution of the seats for the 41 County Councils Social Democratic Party (PSD) Democratic Liberal Party (PDL) National Liberal Party (PNL) Greater Romania Party (PRM) Conservative Party (PC) Democratic Forum of Germans in Romania (FDGR/DFDR) Other parties/Independent

== Runoff ==
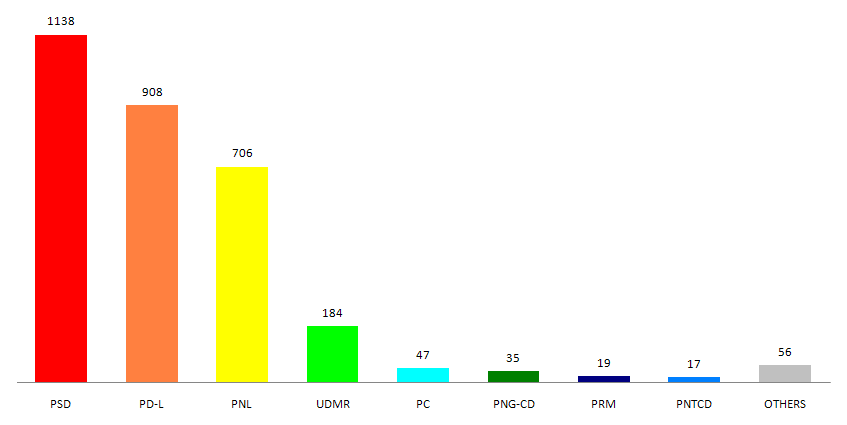
The distribution of the Mayor seats Social Democratic Party (PSD) Democratic Liberal Party (PDL) National Liberal Party (PNL) Democratic Union of Hungarians in Romania (UDMR/RMDSZ) Conservative Party (PC) Democratic Forum of Germans in Romania (FDGR/DFDR) Other parties/Independent candidates

The mayoral runoff was held in 1,441 local constituencies. Also, in the communes of Ştefăneşti and Vidra, in Ilfov County the first tour was repeated, due to the cancellation of the election held on 1 June in the two communes. If a runoff is needed for the mayor's election, it will be held on 24 June. A sentence regarding the cancellation of the electoral process in the commune of Iepurești, Giurgiu is pending from the Central Electoral Bureau.

The independent and former Social Democratic Party (PSD) member Sorin Oprescu won the election for mayor of Bucharest with 54% against Vasile Blaga from the president's Democratic Liberal Party (PDL). Overall, Social Democratic Party (PSD) won about a third of the mayors, while Democratic Liberal Party (PDL) won slightly less.

In Voinești, a tiny town in northeastern Romania, the incumbent Social Democratic Party (PSD) mayor Neculai Ivaşcu, who died on the election day, was nonetheless elected over his rival, Gheorghe Dobreanu of the National Liberal Party (PNL); however, the election commission declared the runner-up elected, but Social Democratic Party (PSD) said they would appeal that decision.

Summary of the 1 June 2008 and 15 June 2008 Romanian local election results
Party	County Councils Presidents			Mayors			Local Councils seats (CL)			County Council seats (CJ)		
Party	Votes	%	Seats	Votes	%	Seats	Votes	%	Seats	Votes	%	Seats
Democratic Liberal Party (Partidul Democrat Liberal)	2,243,144	28.17	14	2,964,948	33.58	908	2,356,584	27.70	11,129	2,416,014	28.92	458
Social Democratic Party (Partidul Social Democrat)	2,234,465	28.06	17	2,717,490	30.77	1,138	2,268,271	26.67	12,137	2,337,102	27.97	452
National Liberal Party (Partidul Naţional Liberal)	1,537,840	18.08	5	1,721,834	19.50	706	1,576,214	19.80	8,529	1,521,191	18.20	297
Democratic Union of Hungarians in Romania (Uniunea Democrată Maghiară din România)	419,028	5.26	4	378,413	4.28	184	404,657	4.75	2,195	429,329	5.13	89
Conservative Party (Partidul Conservator)	263,200	3.30	–	224,182	2.53	47	315,825	3.71	1,398	277,492	3.32	16
New Generation Party (Partidul Noua Generaţie - Creştin Democrat)	227,744	2.86	–	159,739	1.80	35	300,661	3.53	1,203	248,757	2.97	9
Greater Romania Party (Partidul România Mare)	252,956	3.17	–	124,492	1.41	19	314,731	3.70	1,090	313,666	3.75	15
Christian Democratic National Peasants' Party (Partidul Naţional Ţărănesc Creştin Democrat)	78,752	0.98	–	53,908	0.61	11	102,137	1.20	326	88,066	1.05	2
Other political parties	703,437	10.12	1	502,202	5.52	131	865,707	8.94	2,260	722,134	8,69	55
Total: 18,313,440 expected voters (turnout 49,38%)	7,960,566	100	41	8,829,208	100	3,179	8,504,787	100	40,297	8,353,751	100	1,393
Source: Central Electoral Bureau Archived 2016-03-03 at the Wayback Machine

== Notable partial election ==
The legislature of the local authorities is of four years, for all the local authorities. Local elected officials who cannot serve the full term (due to death, incompatibility or resignation) are replaced. The members of the Local Councils and County Councils are replaced by the next person on the list elected. For the Mayors and Presidents of the County Councils, elected on a two-round system, and first past the post respectively, no later than 90 days from the vacancy of the post the Government must announce the day the early election is called. The election is not called if the vacancy occurs in the last six months of the term. The newly elected Mayors and Presidents of the County Councils serve the rest of the term. The ad interim Mayors and Presidents of the County Councils are one of the Deputy-Mayors (elected by the Local Council, if the settlement has more than one Deputy-Mayor), and one of the Vice President of the County Council, elected by the County Council.

=== Cluj-Napoca ===
On 22 December 2008, Emil Boc was sworn in as Prime Minister of Romania. He resigned from the office of Mayor of Cluj-Napoca on 4 January 2009. The Government called for partial election in Cluj-Napoca on 15 February 2009. The three main competitors were the ad interim Mayor of Cluj-Napoca, Sorin Apostu (PDL), former Cluj County Council President and current Senator Marius Nicoară (PNL), and former Cluj-Napoca Police commander, Teodor Pop-Pușcaș (PSD).
