= Valeriu Tabără =

Romanian agronomist and politician (1949–2025)

Personal details
- Born: 1 July 1949 Sălciua, Romania
- Died: 29 April 2025 (aged 75) Timișoara, Romania
- Party: PDL (2007–2014); PD-FSN (2001–2007); PUNR (1991–2001)

Valeriu Tabără (Note: Romanian pronunciation: [vaˈlerju ˈtabərə]) (1 July 1949 – 29 April 2025) was a Romanian agronomist and politician. A member of the Romanian National Unity Party (PUNR) and later the Democratic Liberal Party (PD-L), he was a member of the Romanian Chamber of Deputies for Timiș County from 1992 to 2000, representing the same county from 2004 to 2012. In the Nicolae Văcăroiu cabinet, he was Minister of Agriculture from 1994 to 1996, and he held the same position in the Emil Boc cabinet from 2010 to 2012.

== Life and career ==
Tabără was born in Sălciua, Alba County, and in 1967 completed secondary studies at the high school in Baia de Arieș. From then until the following year, Tabără attended the Technical Financial School, and from 1968 to 1973, studied at the Timișoara Agronomy Institute, becoming an agronomic engineer upon graduation and earning a doctorate in Agronomy in 1984. From 1973 to 1977, he worked as a researcher at a limited joint stock company in Lovrin. Beginning his teaching career in 1977 at the Banat University of Agricultural Sciences and Veterinary Medicine, from that year until 1986, he was assistant lecturer. He advanced to senior lecturer, holding that position until 1991, and was then lecturer from 1991 to 1996. From that year, he was a university professor. Also, since 2001, he is again a researcher at the Lovrin firm where he worked previously. He authored and coordinated over 220 published scientific works, is the sole author of three books and co-author of five others, and led the thesis committee at his university beginning in 2004.

From 1972 to 1989, Tabără belonged to the ruling Romanian Communist Party. Following the fall of the Communist regime, in 1991 he joined the PUNR, serving as its vice president from 1992 to 1997, a period that included his first stint as Agriculture Minister from August 1994 to September 1996, during the time of the Red Quadrilateral. In 1997, he became PUNR president, with the moderate nationalist Tabără taking control of the party from the more vocal Gheorghe Funar, prompting a massive split, with the latter taking his wing of the party into Corneliu Vadim Tudor's Greater Romania Party. As leader, he focused on concrete issues ranging from education to self-government of minorities, contrasting with his predecessor's vocal identity politics and in the process abandoning a means of competition with the Social Democrats, long installed as a moderate nationalist party. He ceased being leader in 2001, when he left the party. In 2002 he entered the PD (which evolved into the PD-L in 2008), serving on its permanent national bureau until 2004, and as vice president of its Timiș County chapter since then. His first public office was on the prefectural administrative council of Timiș County (1991–1992), and he served on the Timiș County Council from 2004. In the Chamber, he served on the committees on agriculture, forestry, food industry and specific services (1992–1993, 1995–, including as president since 2008) and foreign policy (1993–1995). From 1993 to 1994 and 1996 to 2000, he led the PUNR group in the Chamber, and was deputy leader of the PD-L group there from 2005 to 2008. In September 2010, Tabără was again named to the Agriculture Ministry by Boc, following a cabinet reshuffle. In February 2012, he resigned along with the rest of the cabinet amid anti-government protests.

Tabără and his wife, Silvia, had a daughter and a son. He died from a cardiac arrest in Timișoara, on 29 April 2025, at the age of 75.
