= Marius Nicoară =

Romanian politician (born 1958)

Marius-Petre Nicoară

President of the Cluj County Council
- In office May 2004 – 18 June 2008
- Deputy: Sándor Kerekes; Mózes Zoltán Pálfi
- Preceded by: Şerban Graţian
- Succeeded by: Alin Tişe
- Constituency: Cluj

Senator
- Incumbent
- Assumed office December 2008 Serving with Three others
- President: Traian Băsescu
- Prime Minister: Emil Boc
- Constituency: No. 13 Cluj

Personal details
- Born: 19 November 1958 (age 67) Cluj, Cluj County, Romania
- Party: National Liberal Party
- Children: Petra Nicoară
- Education: Technical University of Cluj-Napoca
- Occupation: Politician
- Profession: Mechanical engineering
- Website: http://www.mariusnicoara.ro/

Marius Nicoară is a former president of the Cluj County Council, and president of the Cluj National Liberal Party (PNL). As President of the County Council, he was both the head of the local Legislature (the County Council) and the local Executive (as the administrative law gives executive powers to the presidents of the counties' legislatures).

On 10 May 2010, he was filmed while watching an erotic film on his laptop during a session in Parliament. He commented: "This was not an adult movie, it was simply an email I received from a colleague [...]. That had nothing to do with adult movies. [...] It's just a movie about Thai vs American massage".
