= Octavian Utalea =

Prefect of Romania (1868–1932)

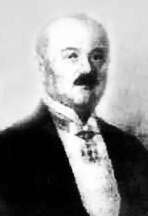
Octavian Utalea

Octavian Utalea (11 February 1868 – 9 May 1932) became mayor of the municipality of Cluj, Romania on 1 May 1923. He served as mayor until 14 March 1926. Among the accomplishments of his term in office were the opening of an Army Club (Cerc Militar) in the Reduta Palace and the founding of a School of Fine Arts (today's School of Plastic Arts) in the Central Park.

He was born in Maieru, at the time in Beszterce-Naszód County, Kingdom of Hungary, now in Bistrița-Năsăud County, Romania. He attended primary school in Sângeorz-Băi and secondary school at the Romanian Higher Secondary School in Năsăud, and from 1889 to 1893 he took classes at the Faculty of Law of Cluj's Franz Joseph University. He obtained his Juris Doctor degree in Cluj in 1905, then the certificate of free practice of law in Târgu Mureș in 1906, after which he settled in Rodna. At the start of World War I, he was mobilized into the Austro-Hungarian Army and sent to the front with the rank of officer. In the fall of 1918, he was a military engineering captain in the Cluj garrison. He then became very active in the national liberation movement of Transylvania's Romanians, being present at the Great National Assembly of 1 December 1918. Aside from being mayor of Cluj, he held other administrative functions, for instance being prefect of Cluj County for a short time.

Utalea was awarded the Order of the Crown of Romania in the rank of Officer in 1922, and in the rank of Commander in 1925. In 1929, he was elected to the permanent delegation of the Cluj County organization of the National Liberal Party. He was a member of ASTRA in Sibiu and of the Virtus Romana Rediviva lecture society in Năsăud. He died in 1932 in Cochiș, Cluj County, and was reinterred in 1938 in the church cemetery at Sângeorz-Băi.

== See also ==
- List of mayors of Cluj-Napoca
