= Iulian Pop =

Austro-Hungarian politician

Mayor of Cluj-Napoca
- In office 19 January 1919 – 13 April 1923
- Preceded by: Position Created
- Succeeded by: Aurel Moga (interim)

Personal details
- Born: 12 March 1880 Buduș, Beszterce-Naszód County, Austria-Hungary
- Died: 22 November 1923 (aged 43) Cluj, Kingdom of Romania
- Education: Franz Joseph University
- Profession: Lawyer
- Awards: Order of the Star of Romania, Officer rank

Memorial plaque on Unirii Square, Cluj-Napoca

Iulian Pop (12 March 1880 – 22 November 1923) was an Austro-Hungarian and Romanian lawyer and politician, who became the first Romanian mayor of Cluj on 19 January 1919, a month after Transylvania became part of the Romanian state. He remained mayor until 13 April 1923, when he resigned for health reasons and was succeeded on an interim basis by Aurel Moga.

During his term in office, the Romanian University in Cluj, Upper Dacia was opened on 2 March 1920. Moreover, methane gas began to be introduced to the city, the Capitoline Wolf Statue was unveiled, the bridge over the Someșul Mic River in Michael the Brave Square was built, and massive projects for rebuilding streets and schools were undertaken. On 28 September 1921, Pop unveiled the Capitoline Wolf Statue in the city center, in the presence of over 25,000 residents. In recognition of his achievements as mayor, in 1922 King Ferdinand I awarded Pop the Order of the Star of Romania, Officer rank.

In his honor, in 2001 a high school in Cluj-Napoca was named the "Iulian Pop Economic College".

== Biography ==
He was born in Buduș, present-day Bistrița-Năsăud County. After attending the Gymnasium in Gherla, Pop pursued his studies at Franz Joseph University in Kolozsvár (now Cluj-Napoca), graduating in 1902 with a PhD in Law, and then became a practicing attorney.

He had two brothers, both named Valeriu. The former died at age 12; the latter was a lawyer and politician, 1892–1958. Iulian Pop was married to Veturia Petran and had two sons, Iulian and Mircea. In turn, Iulian had a son, Radu, and a daughter, Anca. Radu had a son, Bogdan Pop; Anca (married Racovitza) had a daughter, Ioana.

== See also ==
- List of mayors of Cluj-Napoca
