= Emil Boc =

Romanian politician

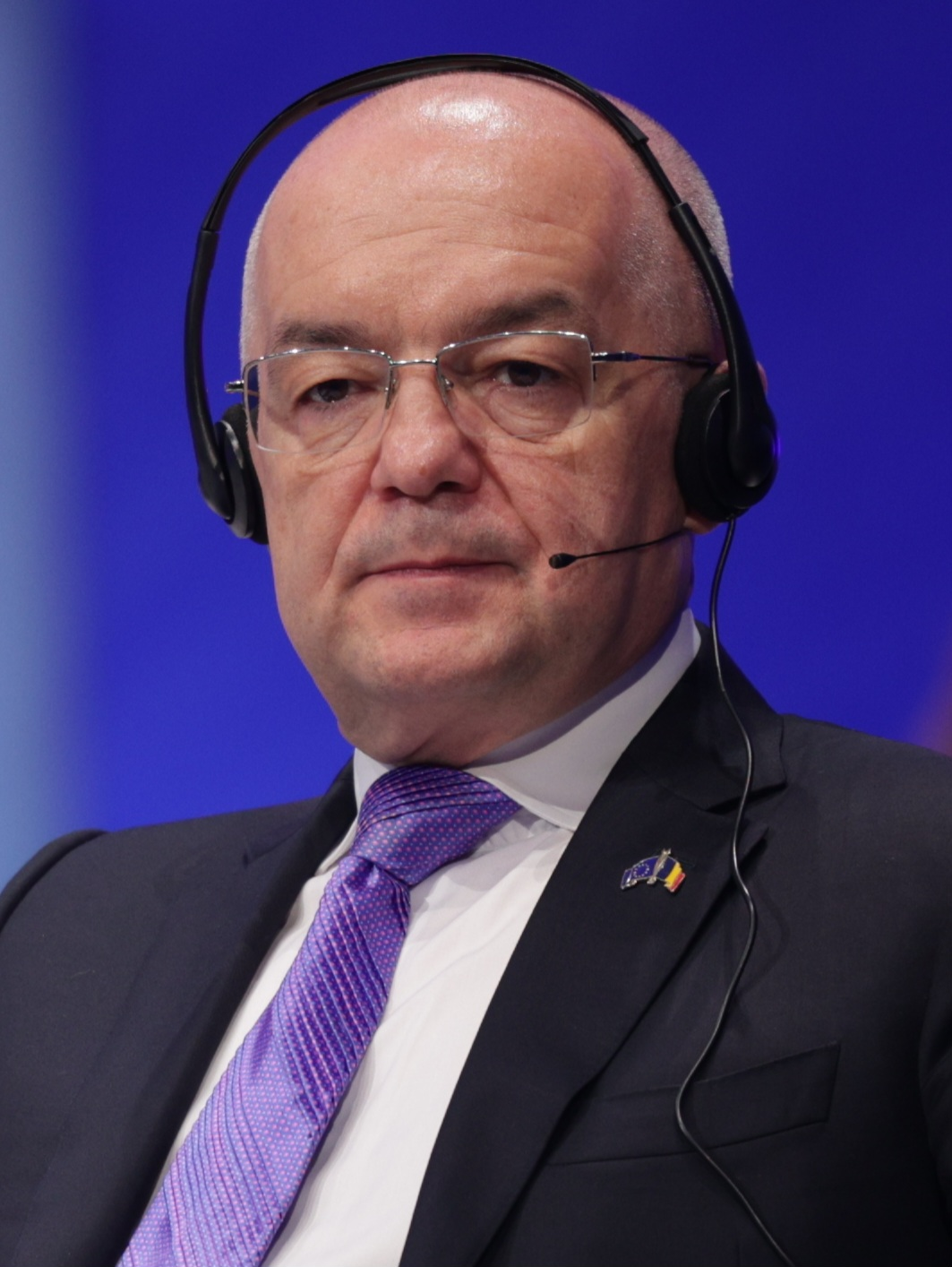
- Boc in 2024

Prime Minister of Romania
- In office 22 December 2008 – 6 February 2012
- President: Traian Băsescu
- Deputy: Dan Nica (2008–2009); Béla Markó (2009–2012)
- Preceded by: Călin Popescu-Tăriceanu
- Succeeded by: Cătălin Predoiu (Acting); Mihai Răzvan Ungureanu

Mayor of Cluj-Napoca
- Incumbent
- Assumed office 12 July 2012
- Preceded by: Radu Moisin (interim)
- In office July 2004 – 22 December 2008
- Preceded by: Gheorghe Funar
- Succeeded by: Sorin Apostu

Member of the Chamber of Deputies
- In office December 2000 – 1 July 2004
- Constituency: Cluj County

Minister of Education, Research and Innovation
- Acting; 2 October 2009 – 23 December 2009
- Prime Minister: Himself
- Preceded by: Ecaterina Andronescu
- Succeeded by: Daniel Funeriu

Leader of the Democratic Liberal Party
- In office 15 December 2007 – 30 June 2012
- Preceded by: Himself (as leader of the Democratic Party); Theodor Stolojan (as leader of the Liberal Democratic Party)
- Succeeded by: Vasile Blaga

Leader of the Democratic Party
- In office 20 December 2004 – 15 December 2007
- Preceded by: Traian Băsescu
- Succeeded by: Himself (party merged with the Liberal Democratic Party into the Democratic Liberal Party)

Personal details
- Born: 6 September 1966 (age 59) Răchițele, Cluj County, Romania (now Mărgău)
- Party: National Liberal Party (2014–present)
- Other party: Democratic Party (2000–2007); Democratic Liberal Party (2007–2014)
- Spouse: Oana Boc (m. 1994)
- Children: 2
- Website: primariaclujnapoca.ro/primarie/primar/

Emil Boc (Note: Romanian pronunciation: [eˈmil ˈbok]) (born 6 September 1966) is a Romanian politician who was Prime Minister of Romania from 22 December 2008 until 6 February 2012 and is the current mayor of Cluj-Napoca, the largest city of Transylvania, where he was first elected in July 2004. Boc was also the president of the Democratic Liberal Party (PDL), which proposed and supported him as Prime Minister in late 2008, from December 2004 until July 2012.

On 13 October 2009, his cabinet fell after losing a motion of no confidence in Parliament. He was acting as the head of acting cabinet until a new prime minister and cabinet were confirmed by Parliament. On 17 December 2009, President Traian Băsescu designated him again to form a new government, receiving afterwards the vote of confidence from the Parliament.

== Personal life ==
Emil Boc was born to Ioan and Ana Boc in the village of Răchițele, commune Mărgău, Cluj County; he has three older brothers (Ioan, Gheorghe, and Traian) and one sister (Dorina). Boc and his wife Oana, a university lecturer whom he married in July 1994, have two daughters, Cezara and Patricia.

== Political career ==
Before the Romanian Revolution of 1989, Boc was, together with future PSD leader Ioan Rus, president of the Association of Communist Students of Cluj County. Boc's entrance into mainstream Romanian politics was in 2003, when he was elected executive president of the Democratic Party (PD); he had been proposed by Traian Băsescu. His original job was to clearly define the Democratic Party's identity so that it would not be confused with the National Liberal Party (PNL).

=== First Cluj-Napoca mayorship (2004–2008) ===
He assumed the position of mayor after the 2004 election victory against the far right nationalist Gheorghe Funar of Romanian National Unity Party (PUNR), who had previously been mayor of Cluj-Napoca for twelve years. In that election, Funar lost out in the first round to both Boc and the Social Democratic Party (PSD) candidate Ioan Rus. Boc went on to defeat Rus in a run-off election. In the 2008 election, Boc received 76.2% of the vote, avoiding a second round. In May 2012 Boc announced to run again for mayor of Cluj-Napoca in the June 2012 local elections which he won.

=== Prime Minister of Romania ===
Following the 2008 legislative elections, the Democratic Liberal Party (PDL) and the Social Democratic Party (PSD) joined forces to form a government. President Traian Băsescu initially nominated Theodor Stolojan as prime minister, but, following Stolojan's withdrawal, on 15 December Boc was nominated as head of government and was confirmed by Parliament on 22 December 2008.

Boc's government fell after a vote of no confidence in the Parliament on 13 October 2009. The vote followed the collapse of his ruling coalition, which was caused by his ousting of Dan Nica, the interior minister. Boc acted as interim prime minister until a new government was to take charge. The opposition parliamentary groups proposed Klaus Iohannis as a candidate, but President Traian Băsescu nominated Lucian Croitoru, and after his failing to obtain the Parliament confirmation for his government, he nominated Liviu Negoiță. Eventually, Boc was reinstated as prime minister after the presidential elections ended with the victory of incumbent president Traian Băsescu who supported him.

On 6 February 2012, Boc resigned from office amid ongoing protests.

=== Second Cluj-Napoca mayorship (2012–present) ===
In 2012, Boc was reelected mayor of Cluj-Napoca once again.

== Electoral history ==
=== Mayor of Cluj-Napoca ===
Election	Affiliation	First round			Second round		
Election	Affiliation	Votes	Percentage	Position	Votes	Percentage	Position
2004	DA	49,631	33.12%	1st	79,207	56.26%	1st
2008	PDL	86,657	76.21%	1st	–		
2012	PDL	53,674	49.04%	1st			
2016	PNL	64,311	64.76%	1st			
2020	PNL	73.182	74.72%	1st			
2024	PNL	53.481	42.50%	1st			

== See also ==
- First Boc Cabinet
- Second Boc Cabinet

Political offices
Preceded by Gheorghe Funar	Mayor of Cluj-Napoca; 2004–2008	Succeeded by Sorin Apostu
Preceded by Călin Popescu-Tăriceanu	Prime Minister of Romania; 2008–2012	Succeeded by Cătălin Predoiu; Acting
Preceded by Radu Moisin; Acting	Mayor of Cluj-Napoca; 2012–present	Incumbent
Party political offices
New political party	President of the Democratic Liberal Party; 2008–2012	Succeeded by Vasile Blaga
Preceded by Traian Băsescu	President of the Democratic Party; 2005–2008	Party dissolved
