= Nicolae Drăganu =

Austro-Hungarian-born Romanian linguist, philologist and literary historian

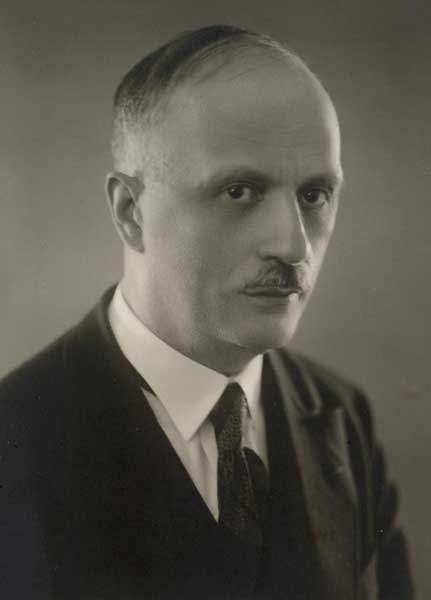
Nicolae Drăganu

Nicolae Drăganu (18 February 1884 – 18 December 1939) was an Austro-Hungarian-born Romanian linguist, philologist, and literary historian.

== Biography ==
Born in Zagra, Bistrița-Năsăud County, into a Greek-Catholic family, he attended primary school in his native village, followed by the Gymnasium in nearby Năsăud. Early on, he developed a reverence for local native George Coșbuc, on whose literary beginnings he later shed light. In 1902, he entered the literature faculty of Budapest University. There, he studied classical languages and Romanian language and literature. He soon earned a doctorate, in 1906, on the composition of Romanian words. He taught at his former high school starting in the 1906–1907 academic year. While at Năsăud, he wrote a number of linguistic and philological studies, and co-authored a history of the town's schools in 1913. In 1917, he was named assistant professor in the Romanian language and literature department of Franz Joseph University in Cluj (Kolozsvár).

Following the union of Transylvania with Romania, this institution was transformed into Cluj University, a process to which he contributed as a member of the organizing committee. He remained on the faculty as professor of Romanian language and early literature. He was assistant rector in 1919–1920, dean of the literature and philosophy faculty in 1923–1924 and 1932–1934 and university rector in 1931–1932. He was an active participant within Sextil Pușcariu's Museum of the Romanian Language, where his research interests included early texts, toponymy and anthroponymy, lexicology and syntax. To each of these he devoted serious research and brought new advancements. Within ASTRA, he was president of the literary section and a member of the central committee. He was elected a corresponding member of the Romanian Academy in June 1923, and advanced to titular member in May 1939. He served as mayor of Cluj from 1933 to 1938. He died suddenly, following a brief illness.

His most important works are the 1933 Românii în veacurile IX-XIV pe baza toponimiei și onomastic ("The Romanians during the 9th to 14th Centuries on the Basis of Toponymy and Onomastics") and two posthumous 1945 volumes, Elemente de sintaxă a limbii române ("Elements of Syntax in the Romanian Language") and Istoria sintaxei ("The History of Syntax"). In Toponimie și istorie ("Toponymy and History") he sought to determine the linguistic origins of the toponyms in the Someș River valley. He contributed to numerous magazines, including Transilvania, Luceafărul, Pagini literare, Orientul român, Solia satelor, Revista Bistriței, Dacoromania, Anuarul Institutului de Istorie Națională, Revista filologică, Buletinul Societății numismatice and Arhiva Someșană.

He was made a commander of the Order of the Crown in 1920. A commemorative plaque was unveiled in Zagra in 1994, and a bust in 2005. He married Olimpia Moisil at age 24; their son was the constitutional law expert Tudor Drăganu.

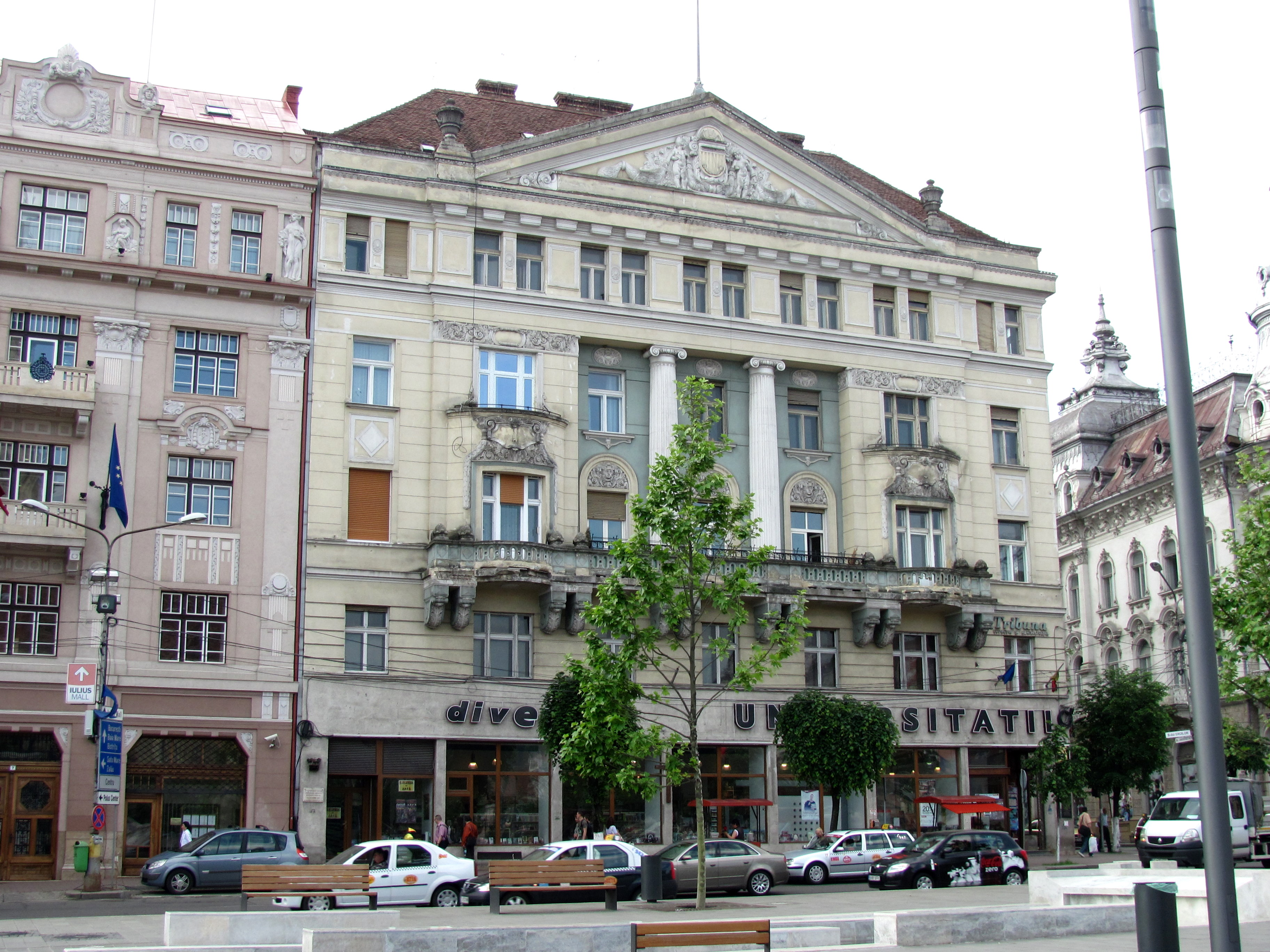
Building in Cluj where Drăganu lived

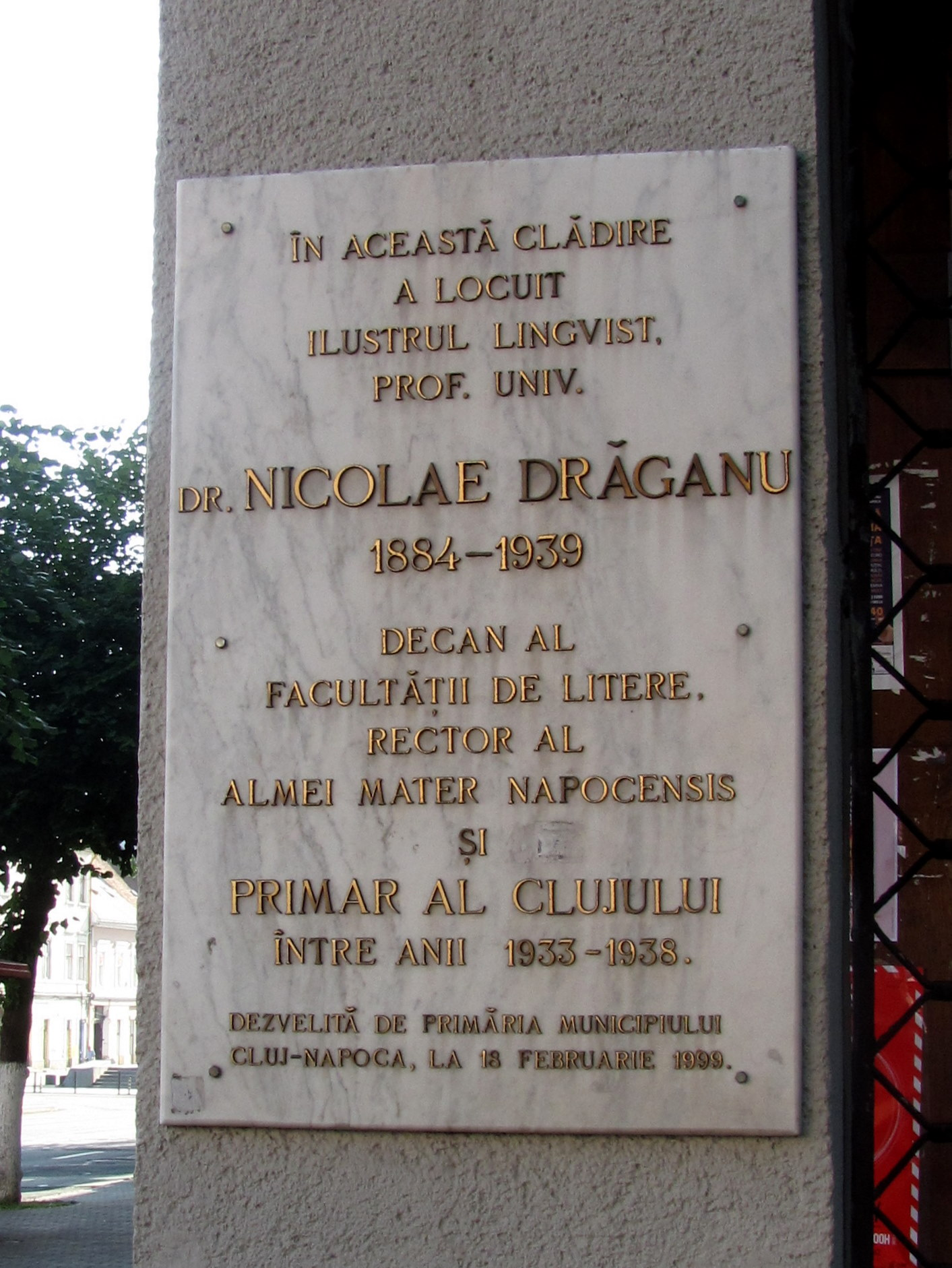
Commemorative plaque on the building (1999)
