= Ion Pop =

Romanian footballer

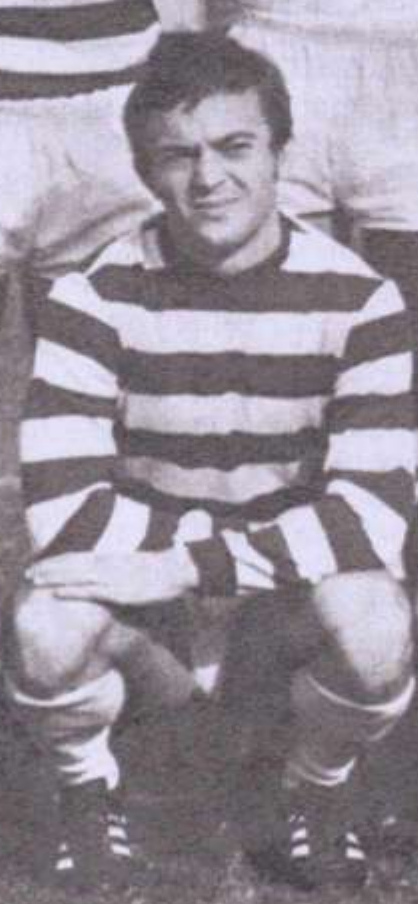
- Pop with Rapid in 1970

Personal information
- Date of birth: 8 May 1947
- Place of birth: Bucharest, Romania
- Date of death: 8 December 2015 (aged 68)
- Place of death: Bucharest, Romania
- Height: 1.71 m (5 ft 7 in)
- Position: Right back

Youth career
- 1960–1961: Victoria București
- 1961–1964: Flacăra Roșie București

Senior career*
Years	Team	Apps	(Gls)
1964–1965	Petrolul Ploiești	1	(0)
1965–1967	Dinamo Pitești	34	(0)
1967–1978	Rapid București (Note: The statistics for the 1977–78 Divizia B season are unavailable.)	276	(5)
Total		311	(5)

International career
1968–1969	Romania U23	2	(0)
1972	Romania Olympic	1	(0)
1972	Romania	2	(0)

Managerial career
- 1989–1990: Rapid București
- * Club domestic league appearances and goals

Ion "Popică" Pop (8 May 1947 – 8 December 2015) was a Romanian footballer who played as a right defender. After he retired from playing football he worked for almost 30 years at Rapid București, mainly at the club's youth center where he taught and formed generations of players, which include Nicolae Stanciu and Nicolae Grigore. His nephew, Mihai Iosif was also a footballer who played at Rapid București.

== International career ==
Pop played two friendly games for Romania, making his debut under coach Gheorghe Ola in a 4–2 away victory against Morocco. His second game for the national team was a 2–2 against Peru and he also appeared once for Romania's Olympic team in a 3–2 loss against Denmark at the 1972 Summer Olympics qualifiers.

== Honours ==
=== Player ===
Rapid Bucureşti

- Divizia B: 1974–75
- Cupa României: 1971–72, 1974–75, runner-up 1967–68

=== Manager ===
Rapid Bucureşti

- Divizia B: 1989–90
