= 2004 Romanian local elections =

Local elections were held in Romania in late May 2004 and a runoff for mayors in early June 2004.

In late May elections were held for:

- all the villages, communes, cities, and municipal councils (Local Councils, Romanian: Consilii Locale), and the Sectors Local Councils of Bucharest (Romanian: Consilii Locale de Sector);
- the 41 County Councils (Romanian: Consilii Județene), and the Bucharest Municipal General Council (Romanian: Consiliul General Al Municipiului București);
- all the mayors (Romanian: Primarii);
  - of the villages, cities, and municipalities;
  - of the Sectors of Bucharest (Romanian: Primării de Sector);
  - The General Mayor of The Municipality of Bucharest (Romanian: Primarul General al Municipiului București).

In early June elections were held, on a runoff system, for all the mayor positions in which nobody received at least 50% of the votes in late May. Incumbent mayor Traian Băsescu won a second term as Mayor of Bucharest but relatively soon became President of Romania after he won the presidential election which was held later during the same year.

== Electoral maps ==
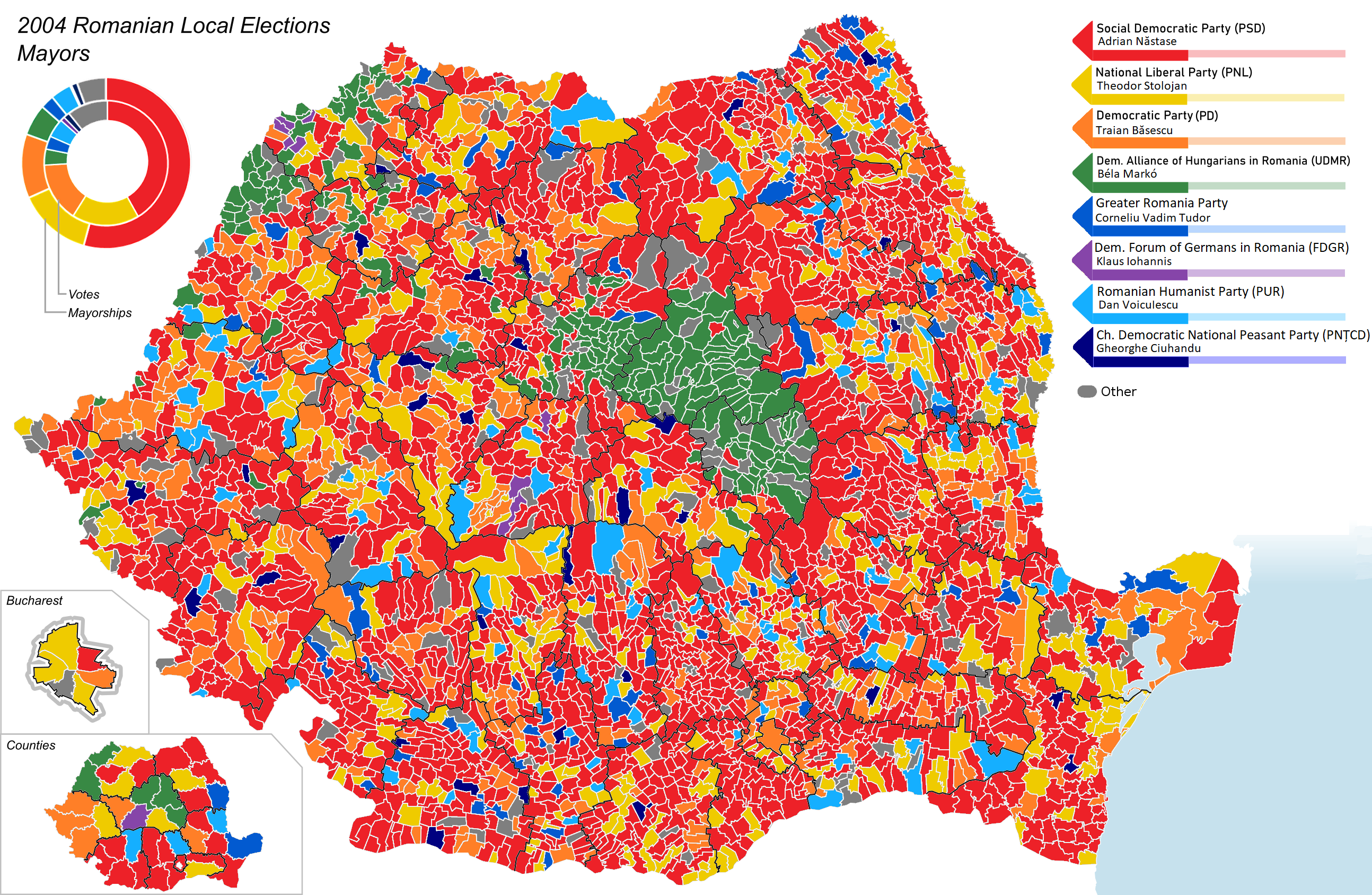
Map depicting the localities according to the colour of the elected mayor

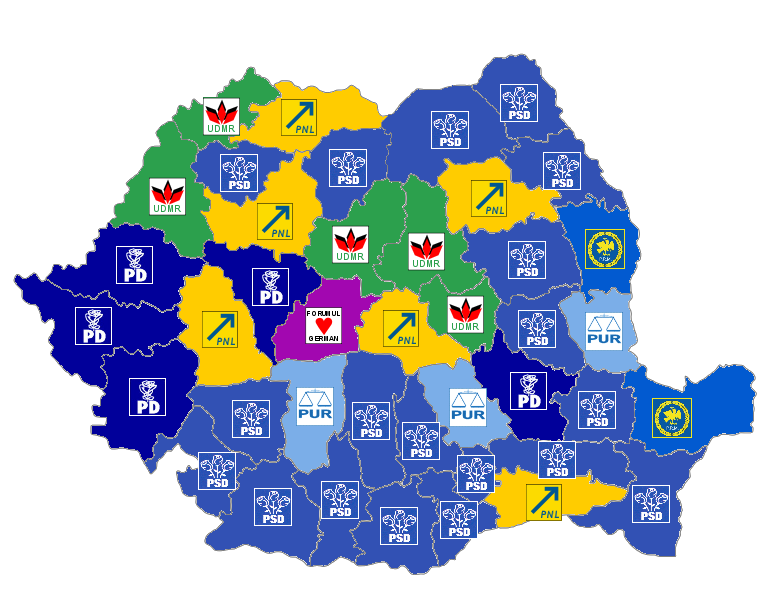
Alternative map for the Romanian counties based on the party of the president of the County Council

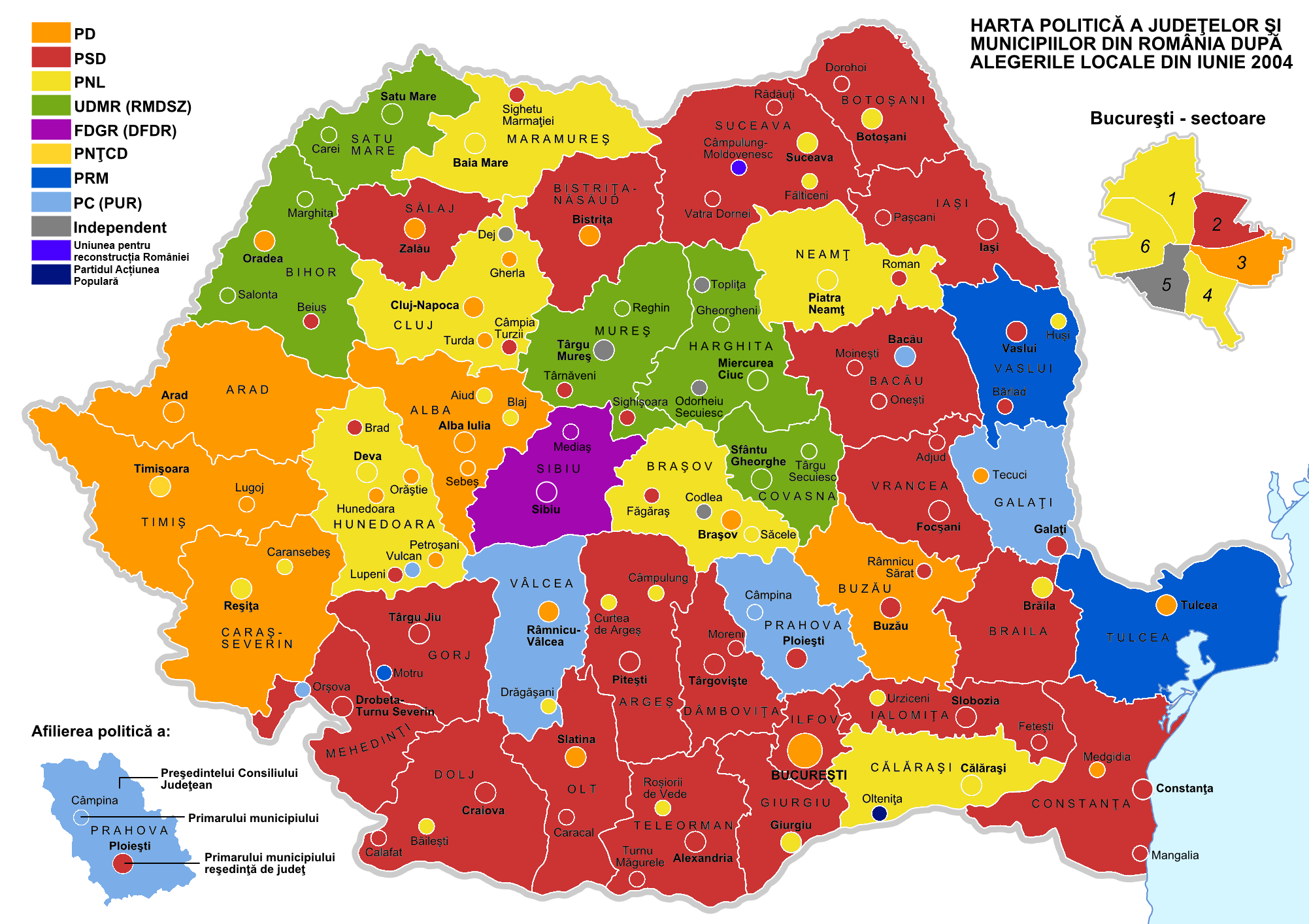
Map of the Romanian counties based on the party of the president of the County Council

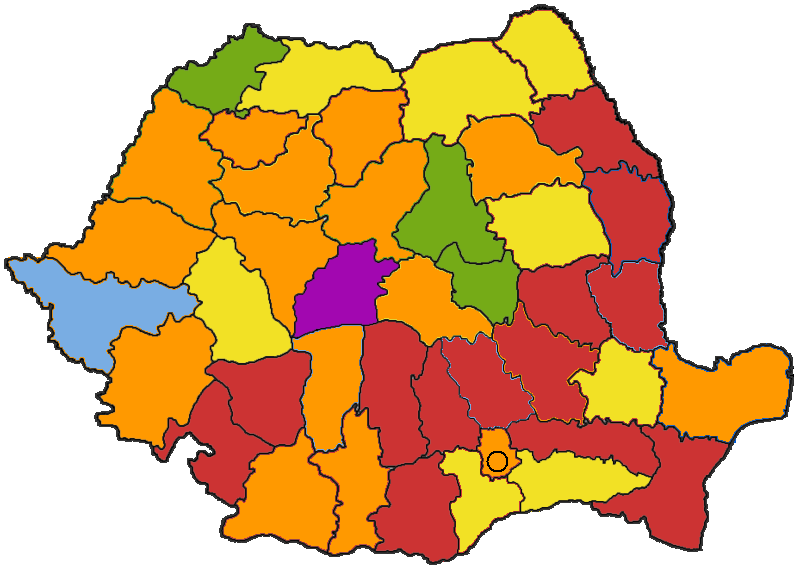
Map of the Romanian counties based on the party of the mayor of the county capital

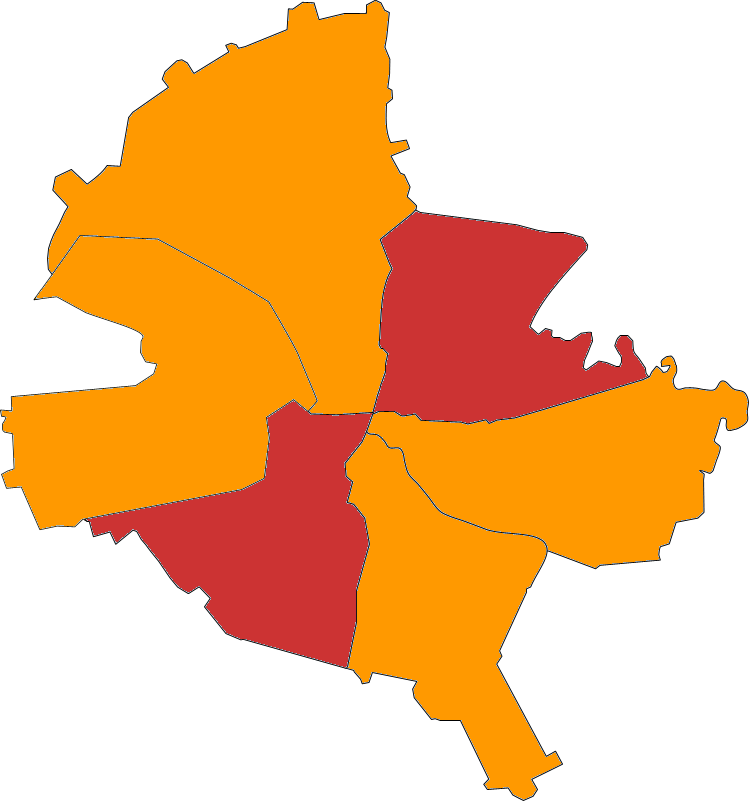
Map of the sectors based on the party of the mayor after the 2004 local elections

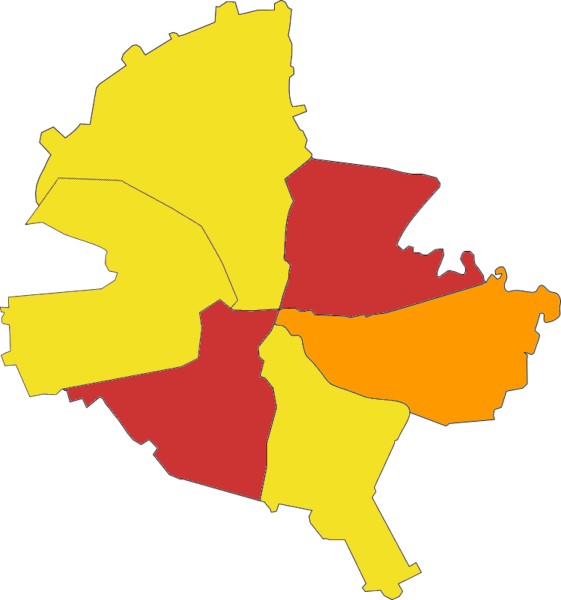
Map of the sectors based on the party mayor as of 2007
