= 2017–2019 Romanian protests =

Protests against political corruption

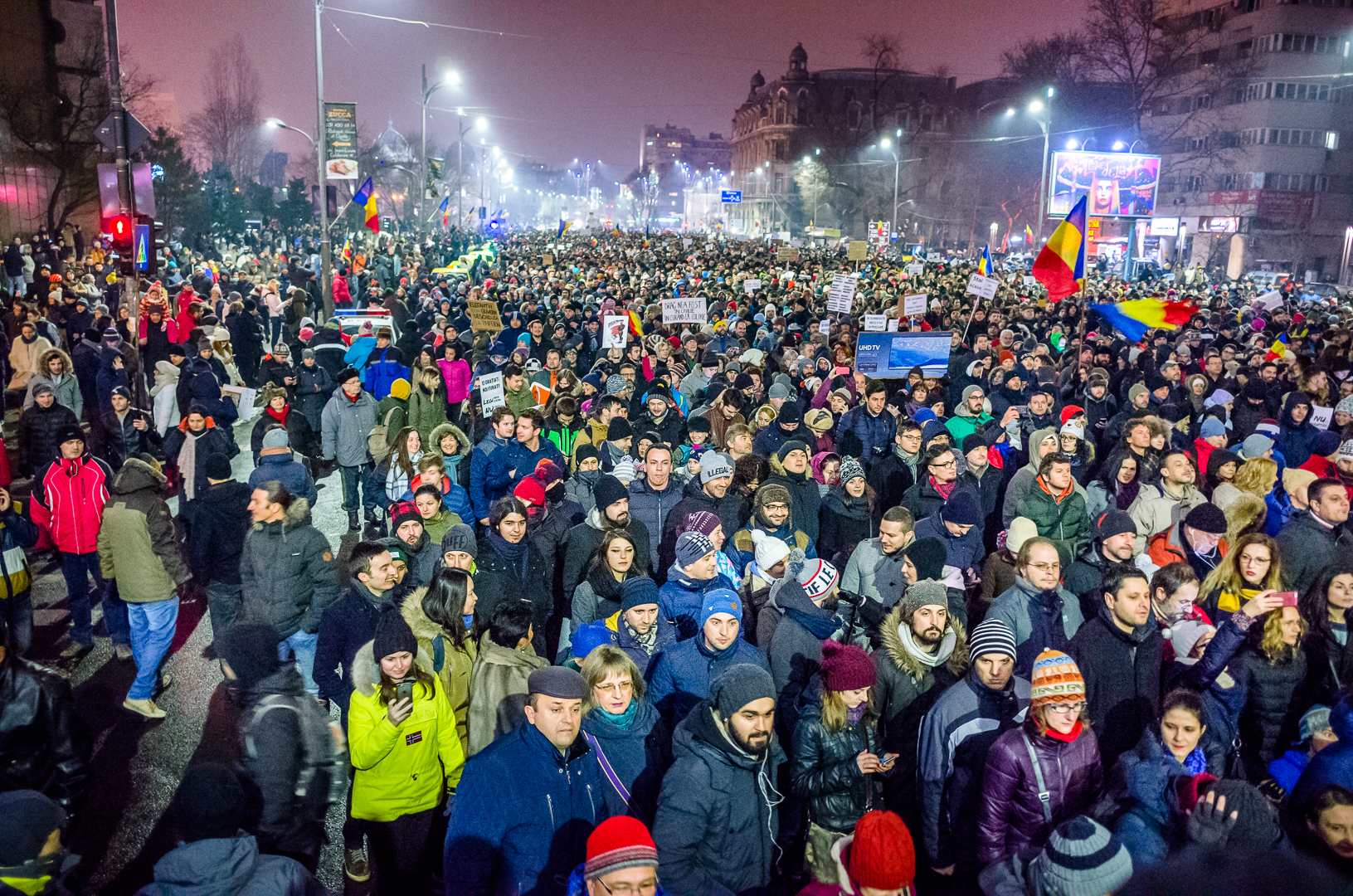
- Protesters in Bucharest, on 22 January 2017
- Date: 18 January – 5 March 2017 (first phase); 23 August 2017 – 10 August 2019 (second phase)
- Location: Romania: including Bucharest, Constanța, Ploieşti, Drobeta-Turnu Severin, Timișoara, Craiova, Iași, Cluj-Napoca, Satu Mare, Baia Mare, Bistrița, Galați, Suceava, Alba Iulia, Sibiu, Brașov, Oradea, Brăila, Târgu Mureș, Bacău, Arad, Târgoviște, Reşiţa, Zalău, Râmnicu Vâlcea, Piatra Neamț, Deva, Drăgăşani, Blaj, Slatina, Piteşti, Caracal, Tulcea, Sighetu Marmației, Focşani, Mediaş, Alexandria, Slobozia, Urziceni, Odobeşti, etc.; Abroad: including: (Moldova) Chișinău (Australia) Melbourne, Perth, Sydney (Austria) Vienna, Linz, Salzburg (Belgium) Brussels (Canada) Toronto, Montreal, Quebec City (Czech Republic) Prague, Brno (Denmark) Copenhagen, Aarhus, Aalborg (Finland) Helsinki (France) Paris, Marseille, Bordeaux, Lyon, Montpellier, Grenoble, Toulouse (Germany) Berlin, Hamburg, Frankfurt, Stuttgart, Bonn, Munich, Heidelberg, Cologne, Freiburg, Nuremberg (Georgia (country)) Tbilisi (Greece) Athens, Thessaloniki (Hungary) Budapest (Republic of Ireland) Dublin (Israel) Tel Aviv (Italy) Rome, Milan, Turin, Verona, Bologna Luxembourg City (Malta) Valletta (Netherlands) Amsterdam (Norway) Haugesund, Ålesund (Poland) Kraków (Spain) Madrid, Barcelona, Valencia, Zaragoza, Bilbao, Ibiza, Palma de Mallorca (Sweden) Stockholm, Gothenburg (Switzerland) Zürich (United Kingdom) London, Birmingham, Leicester, Glasgow, Manchester, Edinburgh, Leeds, Cambridge, Oxford, Bristol, Cardiff, Newcastle (United States) Washington D.C., New York City, Chicago, Los Angeles, Seattle, San Francisco, San Diego, Dallas, Boston Antarctica
- Goals: Withdrawal of the government decrees that pardon some crimes and modify criminal code provisions regarding abuse of power (first phase); Stopping the government's and parliament's measures that weaken the fight against corruption (second phase); Resignation of the government; Early elections
- Methods: Demonstrations; Protest marches; Sit-ins; Occupations; Picketings; Online activism
- Concessions: Withdrawal of the decrees that started the protests (5 February 2017); Resignation of the Minister of Justice Florin Iordache (9 February 2017); Sentencing of Liviu Dragnea, the leader of the governing party PSD, to 3 and a half years of imprisonment for corruption (27 May 2019); Dismissal of the Dăncilă Cabinet in early October. The PNL forms, shortly afterwards, a minority government with the supply and confidence of USR, PMP, ALDE, UDMR, and the parties of ethnic minorities. PSD remains in opposition until 2021.; Resignation of Viorica Dăncilă as PSD party president (subsequently replaced by Marcel Ciolacu).

Parties
(Romania) Anti-government protesters (no centralised leadership): #REZIST movement; Corruption Kills Group Magistrates Opposition parties: National Liberal Party; Save Romania Union; Together Romania Movement; People's Movement Party; Democratic Alliance of Hungarians in Romania Supported by: President of Romania; Romanian Intelligence Service (alleged); Soros Foundation (alleged)	Government of Romania: PSD-ALDE Alliance; Social Democratic Party; Alliance of Liberals and Democrats

Lead figures
Political leaders: Klaus Iohannis; Ludovic Orban; Nicușor Dan; Dan Barna; Dacian Cioloș; Traian Băsescu; Eugen Tomac; Hunor Kelemen	Liviu Dragnea; Călin Popescu-Tăriceanu; Sorin Grindeanu; Mihai Tudose; Viorica Dăncilă

Number
18 Jan 2017: 5,000; 22 Jan 2017: 30,000; 29 Jan 2017: 90,000; 31 Jan 2017: 37,000; 1 Feb 2017: 100,000; 2 Feb 2017: 222,000; 3 Feb 2017: 325,000; 4 Feb 2017: 366,000; 5 Feb 2017: 500,000 to 600,000; 6 Feb 2017: 53,000; 7 Feb 2017: 15,600; 8 Feb 2017: 17,000; 9 Feb 2017: 11,000; 10 Feb 2017: 14,500; 11 Feb 2017: 11,500; 12 Feb 2017: 80,000 to 102,000; 19 Feb 2017: 6,700; 26 Feb 2017: 5,000; 5 Nov 2017: 35,000; 23 Nov 2017: 5,000; 26 Nov 2017: 45,000; 10 Dec 2017: 16,000 20 Jan 2018: 100,000; 12 May 2018: 20,000; 30 May 2018: 4,000; 10 Jun 2018: 1,000; 19 Jun 2018: 10,000; 20 Jun 2018: 18,000; 21 Jun 2018: 15,000; 23 Jun 2018: 2,500; 24 Jun 2018: 30,000; 27 Jun 2018: 5,000; 10 Aug 2018: 80,000 – 140,000; 11 Aug 2018: 45,000 – 85,000; 12 Aug 2018: 16,000 – 19,000; 1 Dec 2018: 2,000 24 Feb 2019: 25,000; 27 Jul 2019: 2,000 – 5,000 10 Aug 2019: 20,000 – 24,000	Counter-protests supporting the government: 5 Feb: up to 2,500; 6 Feb: 14,000; 7 Feb: 1,000; 8 Feb 2017: 400; 9 Feb 2017: 500; 10 Feb 2017: 500; 11 Feb 2017: 500; 12 Feb 2017: 6,000 9 Jun 2018: 100,000+

Casualties
- Injuries: 452 – 455 (10 August 2018); 12 (11 August 2018)

There were numerous protests against the Romanian Government between 2017 and 2019. In January 2017, days after the government of the Grindeanu Cabinet was sworn into office in Romania, protests took place throughout the country against ordinance bills that were proposed by the Romanian Ministry of Justice regarding the pardoning of certain committed crimes, and the amendment of the Penal Code of Romania (especially regarding the abuse of power). At the heart of these protests is the community Corruption Kills, founded by Florin Bădiță, who alongside other civic groups organized what proved to be the largest protests since 1989, thus realizing the "Revolution of our generation".

Despite the negative reactions from both the judicial institutions and the public, the newly sworn-in government secretly approved an ordinance modifying the Penal Code and Penal Procedure Code during the night of 31 January. Opponents raised accusations that the ordinance was intended for decriminalisation of government corruption, and to help hundreds of current and former politicians to escape ongoing criminal investigations or prison sentences.

Immediately after it was announced that the ordinance was passed, more than 37,000 people protested that night. The next day, on 1 February, the protests swelled to over 300,000 people throughout the country, continuing then daily and peaking on 5 February, when over 500,000 Romanians protested throughout the country, making the protests the largest since the Romanian Revolution of December 1989 and the overthrowing of Nicolae Ceaușescu. Since the main grievance of the protesters (the government interfering with the fight against corruption) was not addressed, but rather gradually joined by the attempts of the parliament to relax the anti-corruption laws, the protests continued on an almost daily basis throughout the country, with more and more protesters demanding early elections in addition to the resignation of the government. After the winter of 2017, the next mass protest was on 20 January 2018, when 50,000 – 100,000 Romanians went to the streets to protest against proposed changes to the penal code and to the justice system laws. While protests on a smaller scale continued to happen almost daily, mass protests then erupted again on 10 August 2018, when an anti-government protest with the "Diaspora at Home" motto was held in Bucharest. The 10 August 2018 protest was marked by unprecedented levels of violence in comparison to the other 2017–2018 protests, and lead to an ongoing resurgence of mass protests in Romania.

By February 2017, protesters had succeeded in compelling the government in 2017 to withdraw the contested ordinance and Florin Iordache, who as justice minister was formally responsible for putting forward the ordinance, resigned shortly thereafter over the scandal that ensued.

== Background ==
Although the government of Prime Minister Sorin Grindeanu repeatedly denied that there were government ordinance bills regarding the pardoning and amnesty of committed crimes, there were strong rumours in the media that the government intended to pass such bills on 18 January 2017, mere days after the government was sworn in. Since the government did not publish the government meeting's agenda for that day, the President of Romania, Klaus Iohannis, took it upon himself to attend and preside over the meeting, as envisioned by Article 87 of the Constitution of Romania. After a private meeting between the president, the prime minister and the justice minister, the government meeting was convened and presided over by the president together with the prime minister. Despite the prime minister's initial attempt to block the press' attendance and subsequent avoidance of the subject, the president announced to the media that there were two bills regarding the pardoning of crimes and the amendment of the Penal Code of Romania. He further announced that the prime minister assured him that these ordinances would not be passed without a transparent process, which included consulting with the relevant judicial institutions, as well as the public.

Soon after the government meeting, the Ministry of Justice published the bills on its website and sent them to the relevant judicial institutions for consultations. The government's main stated reason for these bills was that prisons were overcrowded and in order to avoid paying a fine to the European Court of Human Rights, such measures were needed to improve the conditions in prisons.

After analysing the provisions in the bills, the judicial institutions (including the High Court of Cassation and Justice, the Public Prosecutor's Office, the Superior Council of the Magistracy and the National Anticorruption Directorate) issued negative opinions on the proposed bills, generally stating that the laws would not achieve their stated goals and would rather undermine both the criminal justice system and the fight against corruption.

Civil society and certain media outlets also took a similar stance against the bills, and claimed that the government's reasoning for these bills conceals an intent to pardon convicted politicians and cease ongoing cases against accused politicians.

== Protests ==
=== January 2017 ===
Several thousand Romanians began protests against the reported plans to grant prison pardons and decriminalise certain offences. On 18 January, protests in a few cities were organised on social media against the proposed bills. Around 5,000 people protested throughout Romania, with nearly 4,000 protesters in Bucharest marching from University Square to the government's seat in Victory Square. Smaller protests were held in the cities of Cluj, Sibiu, Iași and Craiova.

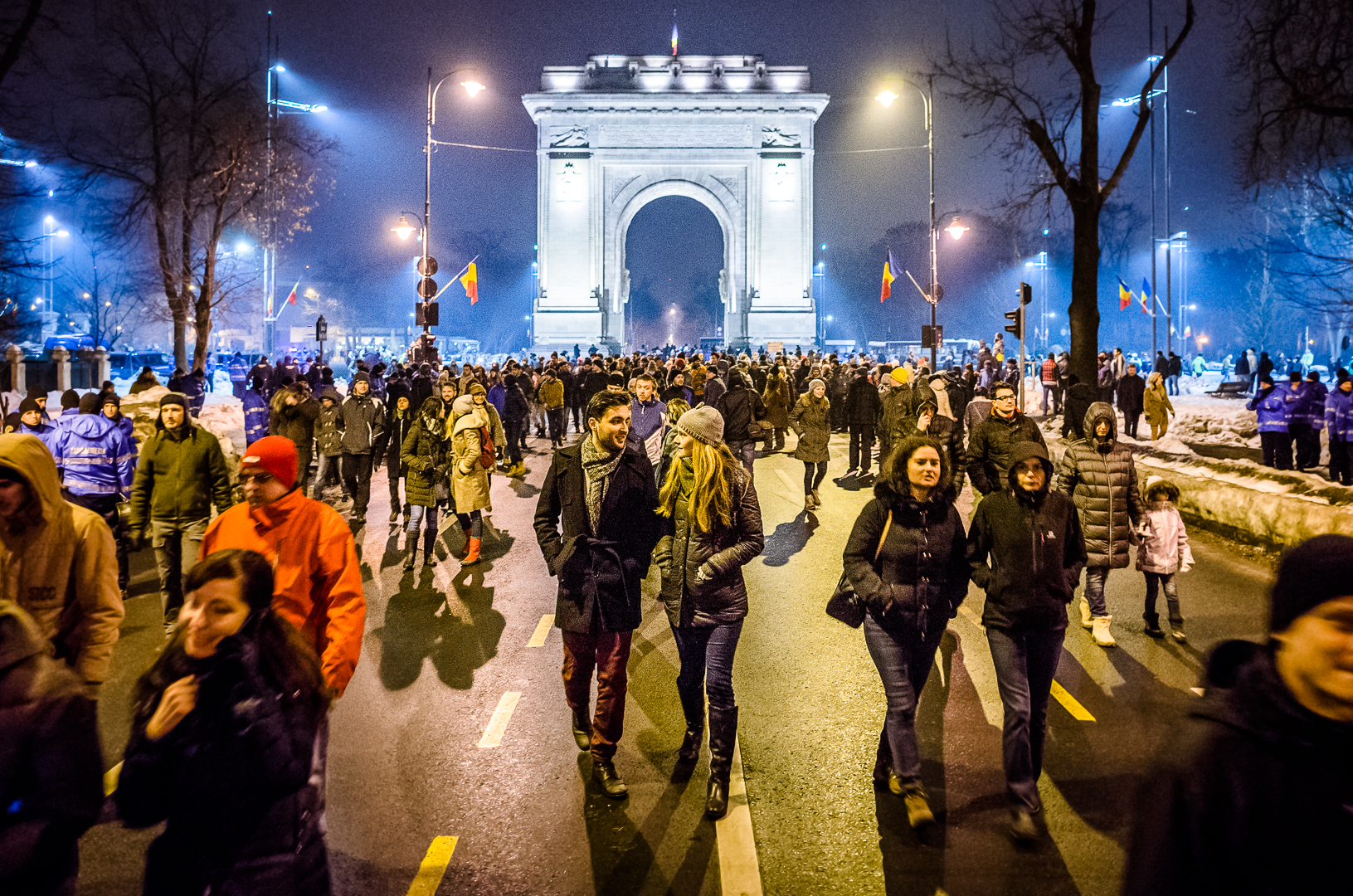
Protesters in front of the Triumphal Arch, Kiseleff Road, Bucharest, on 22 January 2017

Following a mobilisation on social media after the initial protest, over 30,000 people protested on 22 January in Bucharest. President Klaus Iohannis participated in the event in order to show his solidarity with the protesters and announced to reporters that "a gang of politicians who have problems with the law want to change the legislation and weaken the state of law, and this is inadmissible ... Romanians are rightly indignant." Liviu Dragnea, the leader of Romania's Social Democratic Party (PSD), reacted by accusing Iohannis of leading a Mineriad and labelling the protests as the beginning of a coup. The leader of the party Save Romania Union (USR), Nicușor Dan, and interim leader of the National Liberal Party (PNL), Raluca Turcan, were also present at the protest in support of the protesters. Over 5,000 people also participated at the protests in Cluj-Napoca, and another 4,000 protesters in Timișoara (together with the city's mayor). There were also notable protests in Sibiu, Iasi, Brasov, Bacau and Constanta, as well as solidarity meeting in Copenhagen, Paris, London and Haugesund.

In what was described as "the largest protest after the Revolution", tens of thousands of people again took to the streets in Romania's main cities on 29 January. Over 50,000 people were attending the protest in Bucharest, while several tens of thousands of protesters were registered across the rest of the country. For instance, some 10,000 people took to the streets in Cluj-Napoca. In total, over 90,000 people attended the protests, according to an estimate by Digi24 TV station. In Bucharest, the crowd of protesters gathered in the centre of the city, at University Square, and went on a peaceful march that included planned stops at the media watchdog CNA, the Ministry of Justice, the HQ of the Ombudsman and the government. Solidarity marches took place in several countries abroad, with the largest reported in Brussels, Paris, London, Rome and Copenhagen.

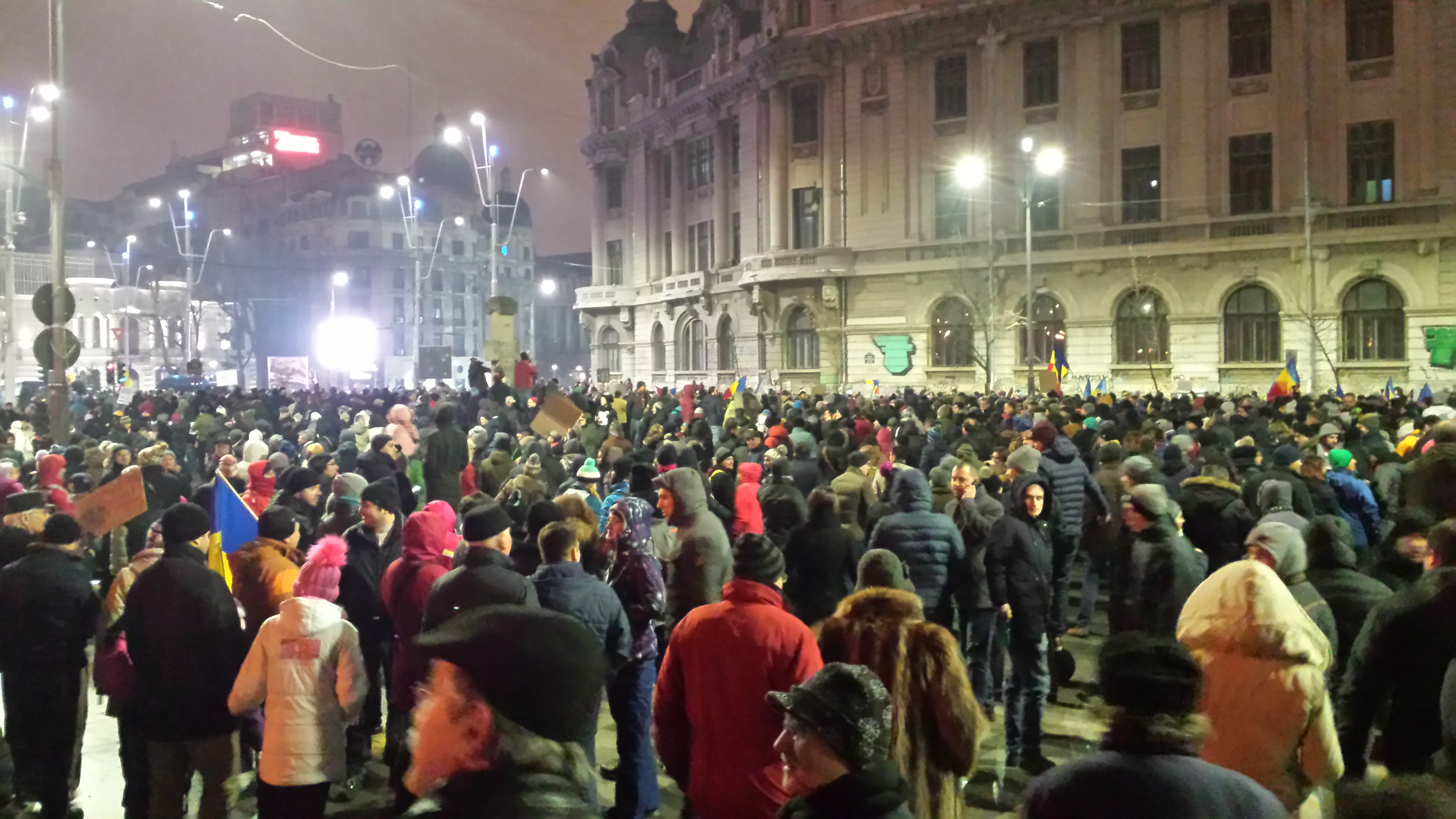
Protesters in University Square, Bucharest, 29 January 2017

After the Grindeanu Cabinet approved the aforementioned emergency ordinances on Tuesday evening, 31 January, thus turning them into laws, an impromptu protest took place at Piața Victoriei in front of Victoria Palace, the government seat. Although the government meeting's agenda only included the approval of the proposed 2017 budget, the cabinet secretly introduced and approved the ordinance bills during the meeting that evening. Once the Justice Minister of Romania, Florin Iordache, announced to the press that evening that the bills had been approved, a protest started taking place 30 minutes afterwards. Within two hours, the protest swelled to 15,000 people despite the late hours and cold weather. Due to the small initial presence of the gendarmes, the Victoria Palace was surrounded by the protesters and the main entrances blocked (although the people inside managed to leave through other entrances). The protest only subsided by 2 am. Unlike the previous protests, the people participating were visibly more riled up considering the lack of transparency and the lack of consideration of the Romanian society's reactions by the government and PSD. As a result, the protesters were calling for the government's resignation.

Thousands of people also came out to protest in other cities throughout Romania against the ordinances adopted by the government: Cluj-Napoca (5,000), Timișoara (1,500), Sibiu (2,000), Brașov (1,500), Iași (500), Ploiești (100) and Constanța (100).

=== February 2017 ===
As a result of the government refusing to repeal the ordinances, the protests continued on 1 February with 230,000 to 300,000 people participating throughout the country. So far, these were the largest protests in Romania since the fall of the communist regime. The calls for the repeal of the ordinances, as well as for the resignation of the government, continued. Around 150,000 people peacefully protested in Bucharest.

The rest of the protests throughout the country were started and ended peacefully, with the participation being as follows: Cluj-Napoca: 35,000, Timișoara: 20,000, Sibiu: 20,000, Iași: 10,000, Brașov: 8,000, Târgu-Mureș: 6,000, Constanța: 5,000, Bacău: 6,000, Alba Iulia: 5,000, Craiova: 4,000, Galați: 3,500, Arad: 2,500, Mediaș: 2,000, and Brăila: 1,000. There were also protests in cities throughout Europe with large Romanian immigrant communities, mostly in London, Paris, Munich, Brussels, Dublin, Turin, Copenhagen and Stockholm.

On 2 February, over 200,000 people protested, with 80,000 in Bucharest. On each of the next two days, more than 300,000 people participated in protests with more than 150,000 in Bucharest alone.

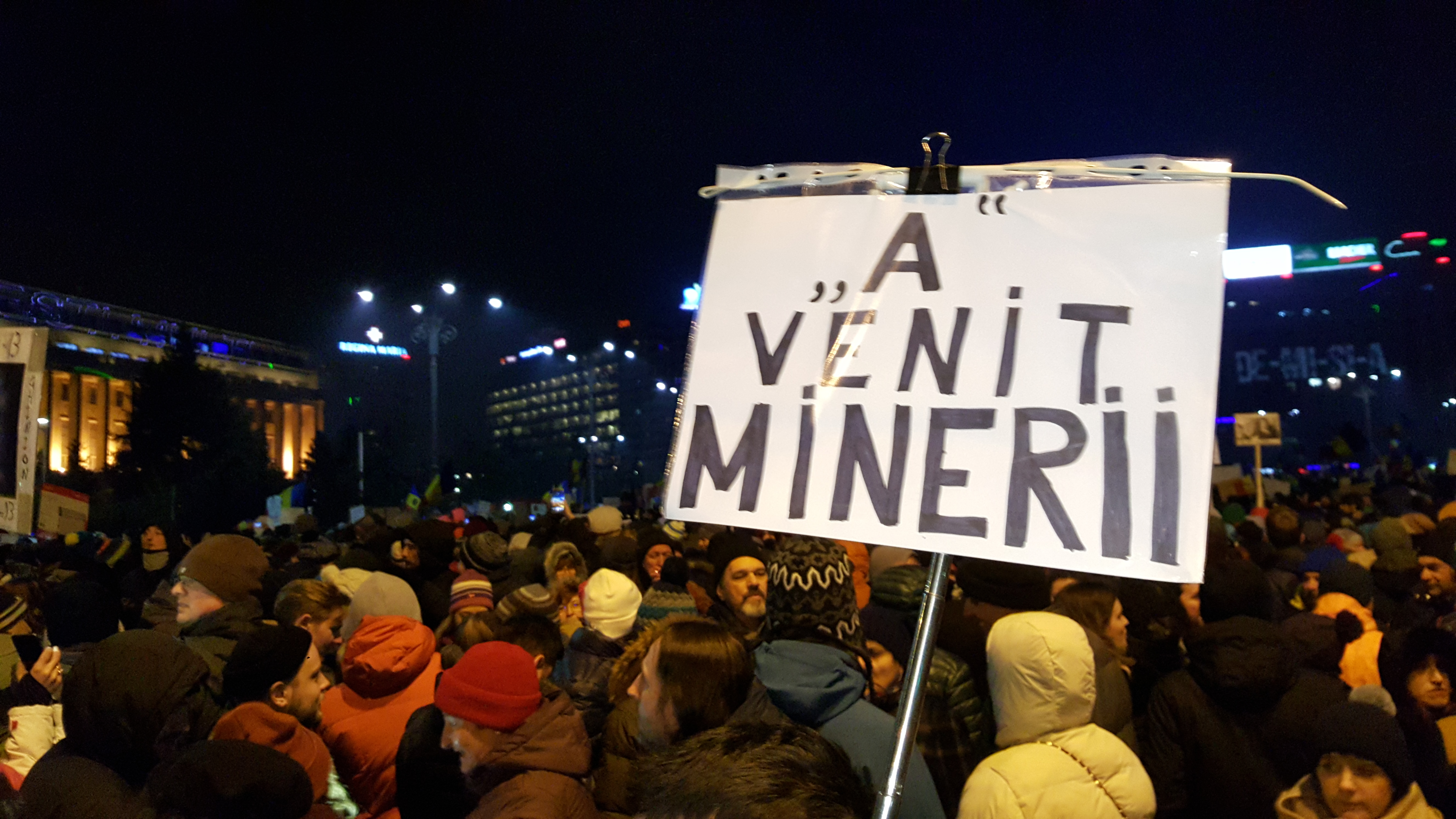
Protesters on Victory Square, Bucharest, 5 February. The text is a reference to the Romanian Mineriad and roughly translates to "The miners 'has' arrived".

Although the Grindeanu Cabinet adopted a new ordinance bill repealing the original bill, on 5 February, between 500,000 and 600,000 people participated in the largest protests in Romania's history. The uncertain constitutionality of the new ordinance as well as the refusal of the government to meet any other demands, including the resignation of the entire cabinet, especially the justice minister, and new elections, led the protesters to question the government's determination and the finality of the matter. Furthermore, Prime Minister Grindeanu stated that the government would try instead to pass the majority of the content from the original ordinance in a new bill through Parliament (where PSD and ALDE have a comfortable majority), angering protesters further. According to estimates by Digi24, 300,000 people were present at the protest in Bucharest, followed by Cluj-Napoca (50,000), Sibiu (45,000), Timișoara (40,000), Iași (30,000), Ploiești (15,000), Brașov (10,000), Craiova (10,000), Baia Mare (8,000), Constanța (7,000), Oradea (5,000) and Bacău (5,000). Hotnews.ro provided a lower estimate for Bucharest, of 250,000.

An estimated 50,000 people continued to protest on 6 February demanding the resignation of Grindeanu Cabinet, with between 20,000 and 25,000 protesting in front of the Government's building in Bucharest, and some other 25,000 protesters around the country. As many as 15,000 people protested throughout the country with 8,000 in Bucharest on 7 February, and on 8 February, over 9,000 protesters in Bucharest and 8,000 in the rest of the country.

For the 13th consecutive day of protests on 12 February, 50,000 to 70,000 people participated in protests in front of the Victoria Palace, and 30,000 to 33,000 were elsewhere throughout the country, of which 10,000 to 14,000 protested in Cluj-Napoca, 7,000 to 10,000 in Sibiu, 3,000 to 5,000 in Timișoara, 3,000 in Iași, 1,500 in Brașov, 500 in Constanța, 400 in Craiova, 300 in Galați, and 300 in Oradea.

=== The protest continues ===
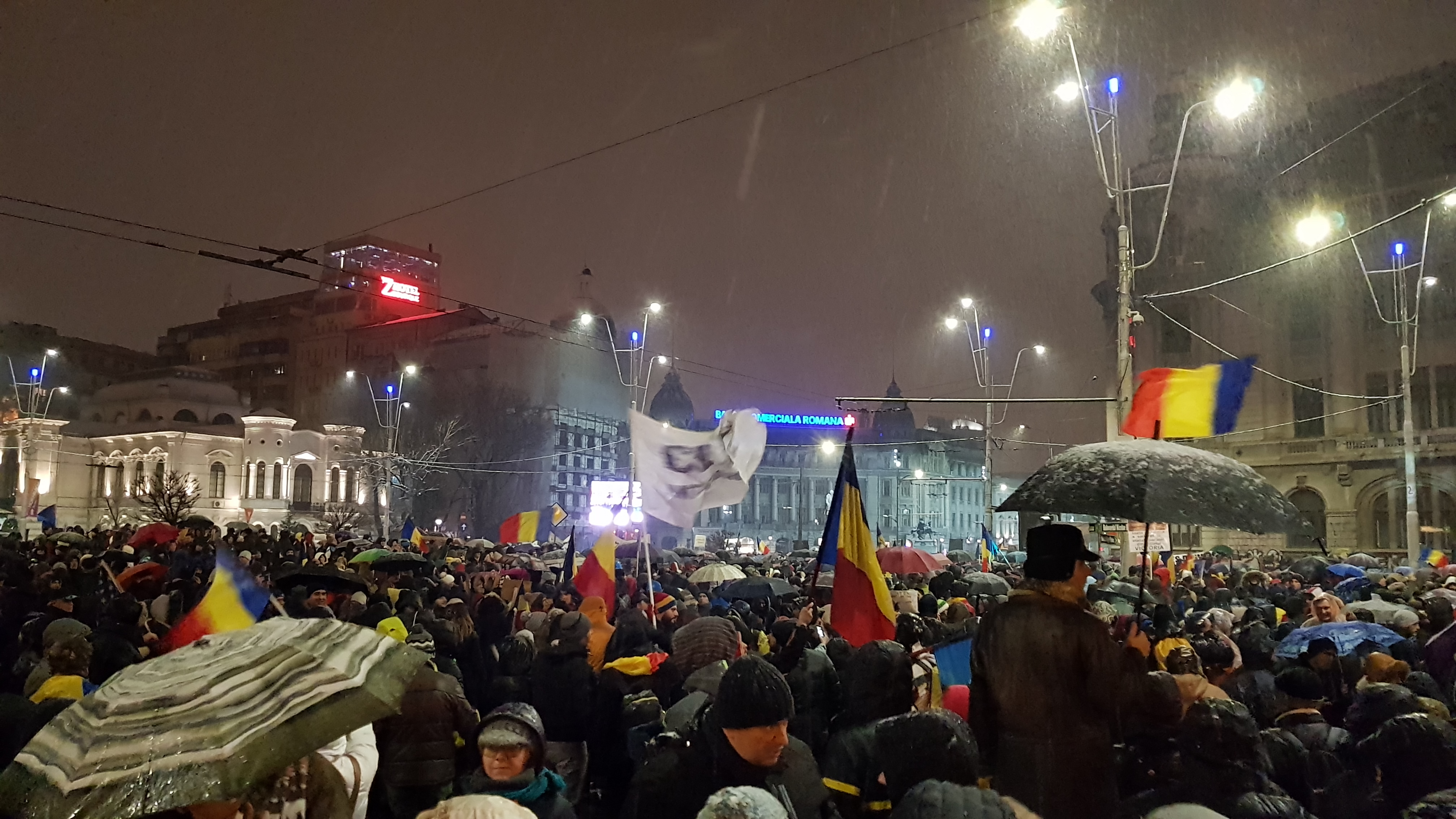
Protest against corruption in Bucharest, on 20 January 2018

A few protesters have been present in Victory Square, Bucharest almost every day since February 2017. After only six months in power, Sorin Grindeanu was removed from the office of Prime Minister by his own party (PSD), after an internal power struggle. Afterwards, Mihai Tudose, a vice-president of PSD, became on 26 June 2017 the new Prime Minister of Romania. Protests continued in Bucharest during the Tudose Cabinet, which continued to try to implement in various ways many of the controversial measures that started the protests in January 2017. Mihai Tudose later, after an internal power struggle, resigned on 15 January 2018 from his office. On 20 January 2018, somewhere between 50,000 and 100,000 people joined an anti-corruption march in Bucharest. After Tudose, Viorica Dăncilă, a PSD member of the European Parliament, was nominated to be the new prime minister of Romania. Viorica Dăncilă took office on 29 January 2018. During her time as prime minister, the protests against the government and parliament have continued, and since February 2018 have gradually grown in size and intensity.

=== August 2018 ===
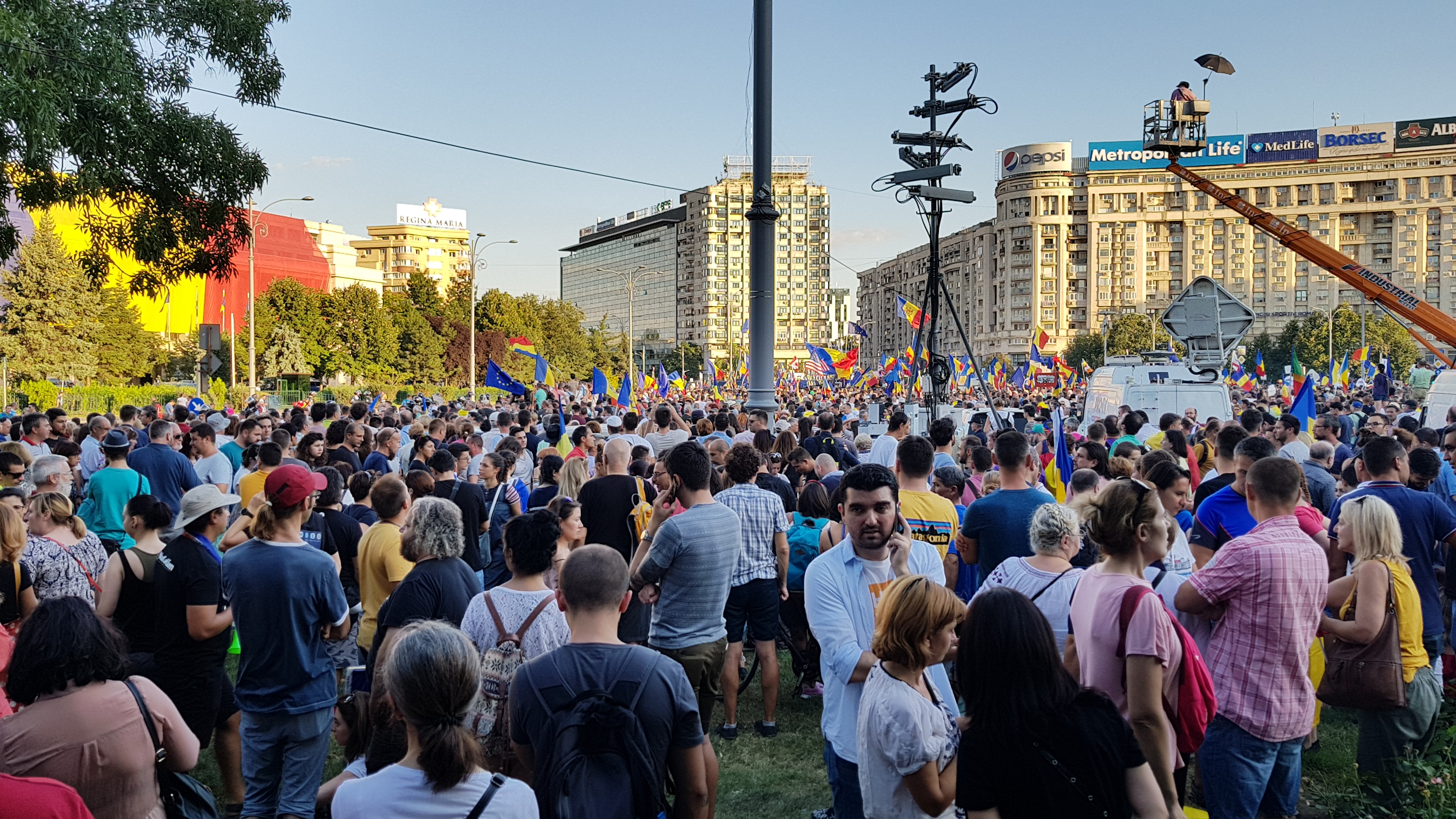
Protests on 10 August at Victoria Square

Fresh anti-government protests took place on August 10, 2018. The event, entitled "Diaspora at Home", was organized and promoted by Romanians living abroad (the Romanian diaspora), who returned home in large numbers for the protest. Up to 100,000 protesters gathered in front of the Victoria Palace, the government headquarters located in the centre of Bucharest. Over 40,000 people protested in other major cities across the country, including 15,000 in Cluj-Napoca, 10,000 in Iași, 10,000 in Sibiu, 6,000 in Timișoara, 5,000 in Brașov, 3,500 in Baia Mare, 1,500 in Constanța, 1,500 in Galați, 1,000 in Bistrița, 1,000 in Craiova and others. Protesters asked for the resignation of the Dăncilă Cabinet (the 129th Romanian government, led by prime-minister Viorica Dăncilă), unhappy with the governing of the ruling Social Democratic Party (PSD). This included the governmental decision-making on judicial legislation and the attempted modification of the criminal (or penal) code, the dismissal of the Prosecutor General of the National Anticorruption Directorate, Laura Codruța Kövesi, the gaffes of the prime minister and the fact that the leader of the Social Democratic Party, Liviu Dragnea, is head of the Chamber of Deputies despite having been sentenced to prison.

The protest in Bucharest started out peacefully, but was marked by the violent attack of the police force in response to some of the protesters who attempted to force their way into a government building (the gendarmes). The gendarmes use tear-gas, pepper spray, a water cannon and gas grenades, at the orders of the prefect of Bucharest, Speranța Cliseru, on the civilian population, indiscriminately. Reportedly, some of the attendees, presumably protesters, were violent themselves, but the majority of the people gathered in Victoria Square were peaceful protesters. Many people were badly beaten by the police (men or women), some were hit until they fainted. At least one person underwent surgery for the removal of explosives used by the police on the civilians. Images posted on social media showed unarmed protesters being beaten by the gendarmes. The Austrian national public broadcaster ORF reported that one of their cameramen covering the protest in Bucharest was beaten up by gendarmes. The Romanian news website Hotnews.ro reported as well that one of their journalists was beaten by riot police while "live broadcasting on Facebook an intervention of the riot police on Victoriei Avenue, close to Victoriei Square where most of the protest took place". The Israeli embassy released a statement that according to the evidence they had at the time (13 August), it seemed that four Israeli tourists who were in the area of the protests were dragged out of their taxi and beaten up by the law enforcement forces. In total during the protests on 10 August and in the clashes the followed that night, 452 people were injured and 70 were hospitalized, including 3 gendarmes.

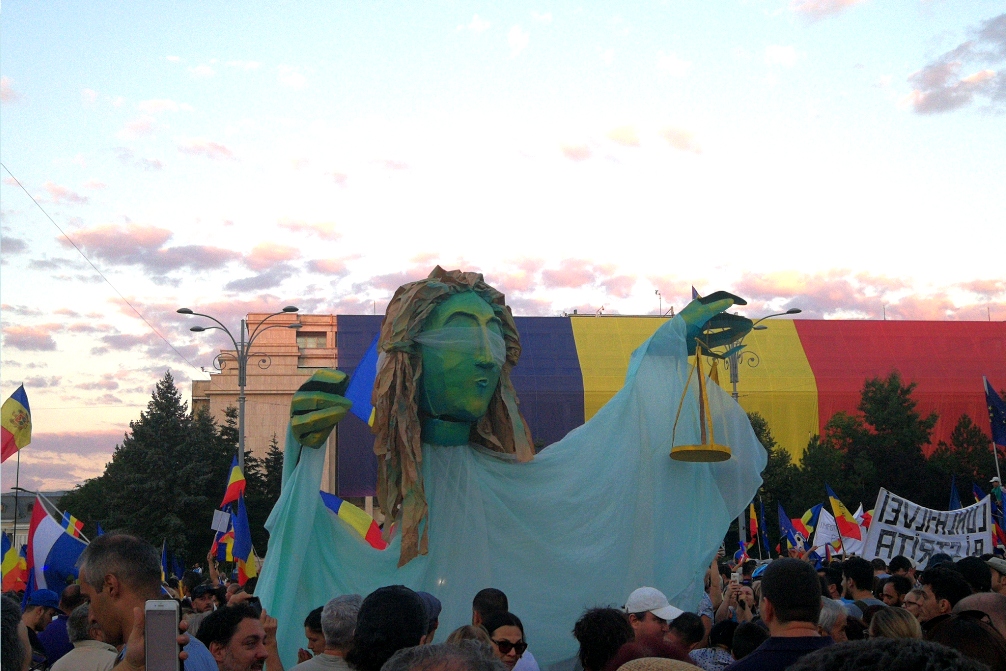
Protests on 10 August at Victoria Square

In the aftermath of the violence, the Save Romania Union, one of the opposition parties, requested the resignation of the Minister of Internal Affairs, Carmen Dan, and the head of the Romanian Gendarmerie, Sebastian Cucoș. The Romanian president, Klaus Iohannis, also condemned the "brutal intervention of the gendarmerie, vastly disproportionate relative to the actions of the majority of those in Victoria Square". In response, Liviu Dragnea, the leader of the Social Democratic Party, said that "the declaration of president Iohannis is practically an act of subversion of the authority of the state" and that "through this attitude, president Iohannis proves once again that he is the political sponsor of violence and extremist activities".

The events on 10 August also lead to international reactions. Austrian chancellor Sebastian Kurz strongly condemned the "violent confrontations in Bucharest, at which numerous protesters and journalists were injured" and wished a "speedy recovery to the injured ORF cameraman". Amnesty International called for "prompt, thorough, independent and impartial investigations by civilian authorities into the allegations of unnecessary and excessive use of force by the gendarmerie against participants of a protest in Bucharest on 10 August". The European Commission stated through its spokesperson that it is "closely following the events in Romania" and that "The protesters critiqued the decline of the progress in the domains of judicial reforms and in the fight against corruption. In the context of the Mechanism for Cooperation and Verification, the European Commission follows the events with worry and gives an increased importance to the independence of the judiciary system and of the fight against corruption. Peaceful protests ended in violence. Violence can never be a solution in politics".

On 11 August, around 30,000 to 65,000 people continued to protest in front of the Victoria Palace in Bucharest, with an extra 15,000 to 20,000 protesting in other major cities across the country. The protest, titled "We won't leave until you leave" (with reference to the Dăncilă Cabinet) had no violent incidents, although 12 people were treated for panic attacks, hypertension and fainting.

== Counterprotests ==
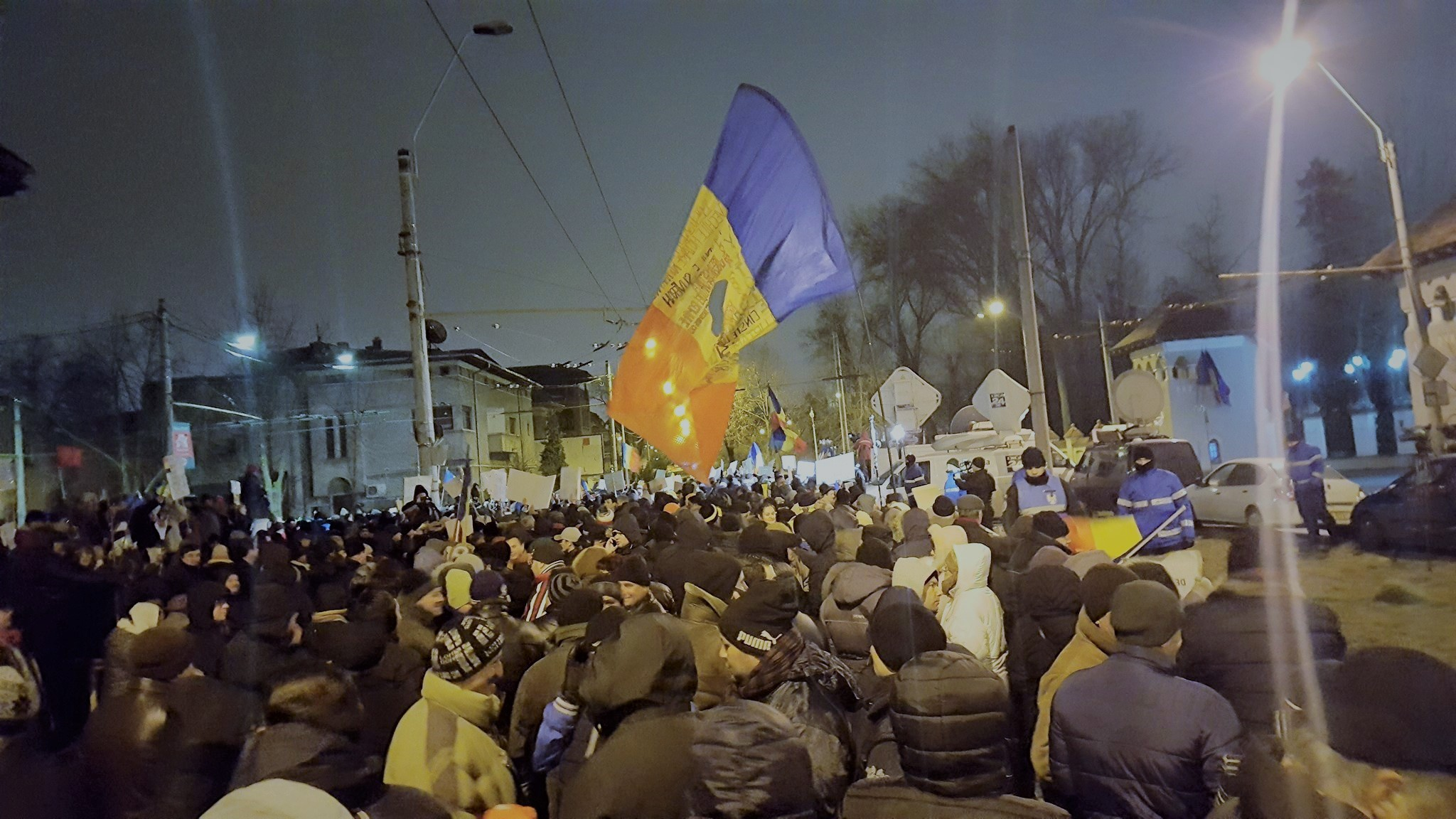
Protest in front of Cotroceni Palace on 7 February

Starting with the afternoon of 5 February 2017, a much smaller crowd of people rallied in support of the Grindeanu government at Cotroceni Palace. Between 1,500 and 2,500 people rallied, demanded the resignation of President Klaus Iohannis. The following day, around 4,000 counter-protesters also met in front of Cotroceni Palace, and afterwards approximately 2,000 people on 7 February 2017.

As snowy weather swept Bucharest of 8 February 2017, President Iohannis went out to meet the 100 people protesting in front of the Cotroceni Palace against his presidency, in order to speak with them and give them tea. He told the protesters that "we are all Romanians", as a response to many protesters claiming he is against the Romanian population due to his German ethnicity. The dialogue quickly broke down as protesters were shouting against him, uninterested in establishing a discussion, and he left soon after. The anti-Iohannis protest attracted 400 people that day.

On 12 February 2017, the pro-government/anti-Iohannis protest continued for its 9th day with 400 protesters.

On 9 June 2018, the ruling Social Democratic Party (PSD) organised a pro-government rally in Bucharest, which had over 100,000 attendants.

== Reactions ==
=== Klaus Iohannis ===
After receiving negative opinions from the judicial institutions regarding the government ordinance bills, President of Romania Klaus Iohannis stated on 20 January 2017 that the presidency requested the government to withdraw the government proposals.

Following the protests on 22 January 2017, Klaus Iohannis announced that he would call for a referendum in order for the public opinion to have a say on these controversial issues. He rebutted Dragnea's claims of a coup by declaring that PSD was attempting a coup d'état against the rule of law in the country, and that Romanians had the right to vote on these issues, especially since they were not part of PSD's electoral programme upon which they won the 2016 parliamentary elections.

=== Liviu Dragnea ===
Liviu Dragnea stated on 23 January 2017 that the president's attendance at the government meeting on 18 January 2017 was unconstitutional, and that he was attempting a coup against a democratically elected government by participating (and "leading") the protest on 22 January 2017. Furthermore, he stated that the president has been insistent in blocking the implementation of PSD's electoral programme, and that the president's actions risked the possibility of his suspension by the Parliament.

=== Romanian government ===
Despite the negative reactions from the relevant judicial institutions, as well as the massive protests that took place throughout the country, the Grindeanu Cabinet, especially Florin Iordache (Justice Minister), repeatedly restated their position in favour of the bills. However, before 1 February 2017, Florin Iordache was seemingly backing down by leaning towards the option of the laws not being passed as Emergency Government Ordinances, but rather being sent to Parliament after the public consultations and modifications have been made.

On 31 January 2017, the Grindeanu Cabinet had a meeting during the evening and the published agenda announced that the 2017 Budget will be discussed and passed. However, the emergency ordinance bill regarding the modification of the Penal Code and Penal Procedure Code was introduced during the meeting, even though it was not listed in the agenda, nor the supplementary agenda list. During the meeting, the emergency government ordinance was passed by the government. A mere five hours after its approval, the ordinance was published in the Monitorul Oficial (the government gazette), thus turning the bill into law. The law were barely modified since the initial draft, and in fact certain aspects of crimes were decriminalised, such as limiting the crime of "favouring the offender", which were not included the initial draft during public consultations. The lack of transparency in passing the bill, as well as the final form of the law, has been interpreted as a lack of consideration of the reactions received by the government and PSD from various parts of Romanian society.

On 5 February 2017, due to the pressure of the ongoing protests, the Grindeanu Cabinet adopted a new ordinance (OUG 14/2017) repealing the original bill (OUG 13/2017) that modified the Penal Code and Penal Procedure Code. However, questions surrounding the new ordinance's constitutionality arose, which were affirmed by Justice Minister Iordache the following day when he stated that the intent was to bring the two Codes back to their prior form (including the resulting unconstitutionality). Furthermore, Prime Minister Grindeanu stated that the government will instead try to pass the content from the original ordinance in a new bill through Parliament (where PSD and ALDE have a comfortable majority). Other than that, the government refused to meet any other demands that day, such as the resignation of the cabinet.

On 6 February 2017, the Ministry of Justice announced that the intended bill for modifying the two Codes would not be drafted and sent to Parliament for the time being.

On 8 February 2017, the Minister of Justice, Florian Iordache, announced his resignation with immediate effect due to the scandal that ensued from the controversial ordinance that modified the two penal codes.

=== Constitutional Court ===
The Superior Council of Magistracy (CSM), as well as the presidency, notified the Constitutional Court on 1 and 2 February 2017 respectively that there was a constitutional conflict between the relevant institutions (government, parliament and CSM) with regards to the procedure chosen by the government to pass the controversial ordinance.

On 8 February 2017, the Constitutional Court ruled the following: "A constitutional conflict did not exist between the Executive Power (Government) and the Legislative (Parliament), because the Government decision to adopt the Government ordinance bills regarding the modification of the Penal Code and the Penal Procedural Code cannot be qualified as an act of arrogation of legislative powers that otherwise belongs to the Parliament. By adopting the Government ordinance bills, the Government acted in accordance with its own competences, as expressly provided in Art. 117 of the Constitution. ... A constitutional conflict did not exist between the Executive Power and the Supreme Council of the Magistracy (CSM), because the Government does not have legal obligation to request approval from the CSM for such ordinances."

=== Embassies ===
The embassies of Belgium, Canada, France, Germany, Netherlands and the United States released a strong-worded statement against the passing of the ordinances, both in terms of how it was passed, as well as their content. The statement explained that these actions have undermined the rule of law and stifled the fight against corruption. They further explained that the government's actions risk damaging Romania's partnership with the European Union and NATO.

=== American Chamber of Commerce ===
The American Chamber of Commerce in Romania (AmCham) issued a statement which said that "[i]t is extremely worrying for the business community and society as a whole, that legislative pieces with such moral, societal and economic implications with immediate and long term effects are adopted by the government without observing the minimum requirements of transparency in decision-making".

=== United States Department of State ===
On 27 November 2017 the United States Department of State issued a statement noting concern that the Parliament of Romania is considering legislation that could undermine the fight against corruption and weaken judicial independence in Romania. They consider the legislation which was originally proposed by the Ministry of Justice to threaten the progress Romania has made in recent years to build strong judicial institutions shielded from political interference. The United States Department of State has urged the Parliament of Romania to reject proposals that weaken the rule of law and endanger the fight against corruption.

== See also ==
- 2012–2015 unrest in Romania
- Colectiv nightclub fire
- 2017 Albanian opposition protest
- 2017 Belarusian protests
- 2017 Russian protests
- Romanian Revolution
