= Ilan Laufer =

Romanian politician (born 1983)

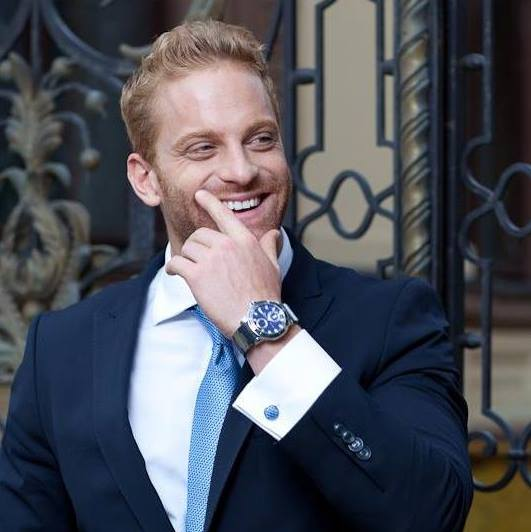
- Incumbent
- Assumed office 13 March 2024

Minister for Business, Trade and Entrepreneurship
- In office 29 June 2017 – 29 January 2018
- Prime Minister: Mihai Tudose

Personal details
- Born: 16 August 1983 (age 43) Bucharest, Socialist Republic of Romania
- Party: Social Democratic Party (until 2019); National Identity Force Party (since 2019)
- Other political affiliations: Alliance for the Union of Romanians (2023–2024)
- Education: National University of Physical Education and Sport

Harry Ilan Laufer (born 16 August 1983) is a Romanian politician who served as Minister for business, trade and entrepreneurship between 29 June 2017 and 29 January 2018 in the Tudose Cabinet.

== Early life ==
Laufer was born on August 16, 1983, in Rishon LeZion, Israel, to Jewish Romanian parents. He graduated from the National University of Physical Education and Sport.

== Political career ==
A member of the Social Democratic Party, Laufer worked for the Romanian Government as an advisor to the Department for Small and Medium Enterprises, Business Environment and Tourism in 2013–2014, including in the mandate of minister delegate in the Victor Ponta Cabinet of his former boss, Florin Jianu, who resigned from the Grindeanu Cabinet in the context of the political scandal regarding the amendment of the Criminal Code.

In 2019, Laufer left the Social Democrats and founded his own Social Liberal Platform, which he later renamed to the National Identity Force Party. The party claims to be centrist and social liberal.

On November 14, 2023, Laufer announced that his party was joining the AUR-led alliance to contest in the 2024 elections. However, in March 2024, Laufer left the AUR alliance and joined the Romanian Sovereigntist Bloc, becoming its president.
