= Tudose cabinet =

Tudose Cabinet
- 127th Cabinet of Romania

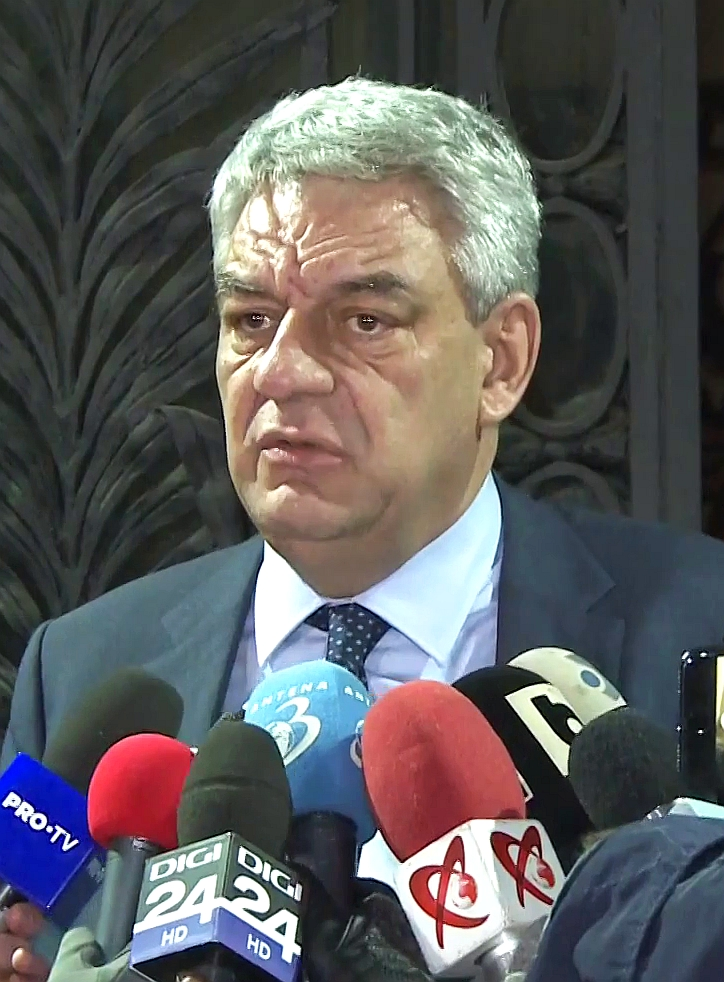
- Date formed: 29 June 2017
- Date dissolved: 29 January 2018

People and organisations
- Head of state: Klaus Iohannis
- Head of government: Mihai Tudose
- Deputy head of government: Sevil Shhaideh (until 17 October 2017); Paul Stănescu; Grațiela Gavrilescu; Marcel Ciolacu
- No. of ministers: 27
- Member parties: PSD; ALDE
- Status in legislature: Coalition (Majority)
- Opposition parties: PNL; USR; PMP
- Opposition leaders: Ludovic Orban; Dan Barna; Traian Băsescu

History
- Outgoing election: 2016
- Legislature term: 2016–2020
- Predecessor: Grindeanu
- Successor: Dăncilă

The Tudose Cabinet was the 127th government of Romania. It was led by Mihai Tudose, who assumed office as Prime Minister of Romania on 29 June 2017. The cabinet had 27 mandates, and 16 of the officeholders were also part of the Grindeanu Cabinet, which was previously dismissed by the Parliament a week earlier for inefficiency.

The Tudose cabinet took office on 29 June.

Position	Minister	Party	Date sworn in	Left office
Prime Minister	Mihai Tudose	PSD	29 June 2017	16 January 2018
Acting Prime Minister	Mihai Fifor	PSD	16 January 2018	29 January 2018
Deputy Prime Minister, Minister of Regional Development	Sevil Shhaideh	PSD	29 June 2017	17 October 2017
Deputy Prime Minister, Minister of Regional Development	Paul Stănescu	PSD	17 October 2017	29 January 2018
Deputy Prime Minister, Minister of Environment	Grațiela Gavrilescu	ALDE	29 June 2017	29 January 2018
Deputy Prime Minister without portfolio	Marcel Ciolacu	PSD	29 June 2017	29 January 2018
Minister of Public Finance	Ionuț Mișa	PSD	29 June 2017	29 January 2018
Minister of Economy	Mihai Fifor	PSD	29 June 2017	12 September 2017
Minister of Economy	Gheorghe Șimon	PSD	12 September 2017	29 January 2018
Minister of National Education	Liviu Pop	PSD	29 June 2017	29 January 2018
Minister of Communications and Information	Lucian Șova	PSD	29 June 2017	29 January 2018
Minister of National Defense	Adrian Țuțuianu	PSD	29 June 2017	5 September 2017
Minister of National Defense	Marcel Ciolacu (acting)	PSD	5 September 2017	12 September 2017
Minister of National Defense	Mihai Fifor	PSD	12 September 2017	29 January 2018
Minister of Health	Florian Bodog	PSD	29 June 2017	29 January 2018
Minister of Justice	Tudorel Toader	Ind.	29 June 2017	29 January 2018
Minister of Foreign Affairs	Teodor Meleșcanu	ALDE	29 June 2017	29 January 2018
Minister of Internal Affairs	Carmen Dan	PSD	29 June 2017	29 January 2018
Minister of Agriculture and Rural Development	Petre Daea	PSD	29 June 2017	29 January 2018
Minister of Culture and National Identity	Lucian Romașcanu	PSD	29 June 2017	29 January 2018
Minister of Research and Innovation	Lucian Georgescu	PSD	29 June 2017	29 January 2018
Minister of Energy	Toma Petcu	ALDE	29 June 2017	29 January 2018
Minister of Waters and Forests	Doina Pană	PSD	29 June 2017	1 January 2018
Minister of Labor and Social Justice	Lia Olguța Vasilescu	PSD	29 June 2017	29 January 2018
Minister of Transport	Răzvan Cuc	PSD	29 June 2017	17 October 2017
Minister of Transport	Felix Stroe	PSD	17 October 2017	29 January 2018
Minister of Youth and Sports	Marius Dunca	PSD	29 June 2017	29 January 2018
Minister of Tourism	Mircea-Titus Dobre	PSD	29 June 2017	29 January 2018
Minister of European Affairs	Victor Negrescu	PSD	29 June 2017	29 January 2018
Minister-Delegate for European Funds	Rovana Plumb	PSD	29 June 2017	17 October 2017
Minister-Delegate for European Funds	Marius Nica	PSD	17 October 2017	29 January 2018
Minister-Delegate for Social Dialogue	Gabriel Petrea	PSD	29 June 2017	29 January 2018
Minister-Delegate for Relations with Parliament	Viorel Ilie	ALDE	29 June 2017	29 January 2018
Minister-Delegate for Business Environment	Ilan Laufer	PSD	29 June 2017	29 January 2018
Minister-Delegate for Romanians Abroad	Andreea Păstârnac	PSD	29 June 2017	29 January 2018
