= Marcel Ciolacu =

Prime Minister of Romania from 2023 to 2025

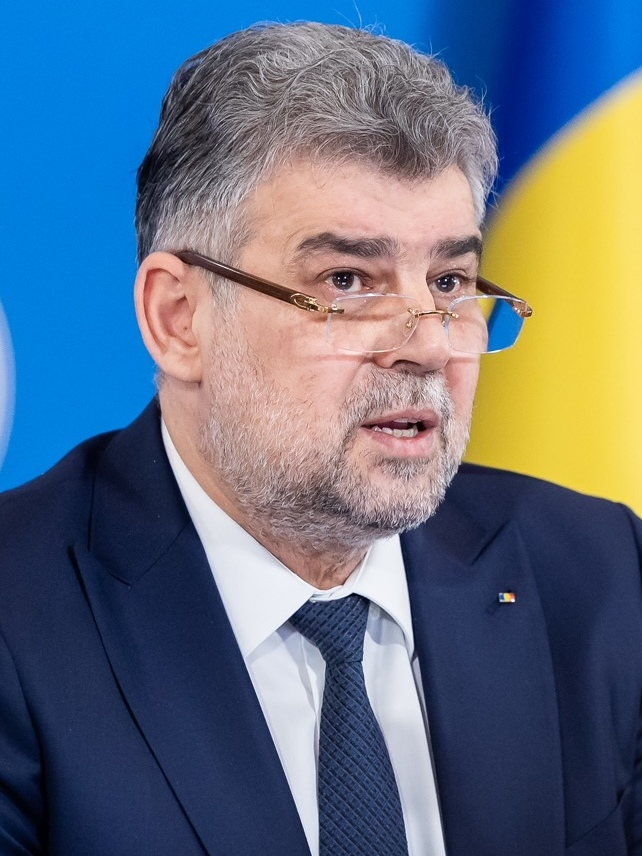
- Ciolacu in 2024

Prime Minister of Romania
- In office 15 June 2023 – 6 May 2025
- President: Klaus Iohannis; Ilie Bolojan (acting)
- Deputy: Marian Neacșu; Cătălin Predoiu; Barna Tánczos
- Preceded by: Nicolae Ciucă
- Succeeded by: Cătălin Predoiu (acting) Ilie Bolojan

President of the Chamber of Deputies
- In office 23 November 2021 – 15 June 2023
- Preceded by: Sorin Grindeanu (acting)
- Succeeded by: Alfred Simonis (acting)
- In office 27 May 2019 – 19 December 2020
- Preceded by: Liviu Dragnea
- Succeeded by: Ludovic Orban

Leader of the Social Democratic Party
- In office 3 December 2024 – 20 May 2025
- Preceded by: Victor Negrescu (acting)
- Succeeded by: Sorin Grindeanu (acting)
- In office 26 November 2019 – 25 November 2024^{[a]}
- Preceded by: Viorica Dăncilă
- Succeeded by: Victor Negrescu (acting)

Deputy Prime Minister of Romania
- In office 29 June 2017 – 29 January 2018
- President: Klaus Iohannis
- Prime Minister: Mihai Tudose; Mihai Fifor (acting)
- Preceded by: Augustin Jianu
- Succeeded by: Viorel Ștefan

Member of the Chamber of Deputies
- In office 19 December 2012 – 18 December 2025
- Constituency: Buzău County

Vice-president of the Socialist International for Central and Eastern Europe
- Incumbent
- Assumed office 16 November 2022

Personal details
- Born: Ion Marcel Ciolacu; 28 November 1967 (age 58) Buzău, Buzău County, Socialist Republic of Romania
- Party: Social Democratic Party
- Spouse: Roxana Ciolacu
- Children: 1
- Education: Ecological University of Bucharest
- a. Acting until 22 August 2020.

Ion Marcel Ciolacu (Note: Romanian pronunciation: [iˈon marˈt͡ʃel t͡ʃjoˈlaku]) (born 28 November 1967) is a Romanian politician who served as the prime minister of Romania from 2023 to 2025. Ciolacu entered national politics in 2012, when he was first elected for a deputy seat in the Parliament of Romania. In 2015, he was elected Social Democratic Party president for Buzău County. Ciolacu came into national prominence in 2018, when he became the Deputy Prime Minister in the cabinet of Prime Minister Mihai Tudose.

Following the overwhelming defeat of new PSD leader Viorica Dăncilă in the 2019 Romanian presidential election, on 26 November 2019, Ciolacu was named leader of the party, firstly ad-interim, until he was confirmed to hold the position by the party congress the next year on 22 August 2020 with an overwhelming 1310–91 margin against his opponent. Ciolacu led the party to victory in the 2020 Romanian legislative election but was not able to form a majority coalition in the new legislative. Other parties opposed to the PSD formed a new coalition on 23 December with the new government, thus pushing Ciolacu's PSD into opposition. However, in 2021, following the political crisis that led to the collapse of the Cîțu Cabinet, he managed to bring the PSD back to the government, forming a cabinet with its former rival, the National Liberal Party, thus forming the National Coalition for Romania.

His premiership was described by opposition figures as illiberal, or authoritarian, being accused of limiting press freedom. He was also accused of economic mismanagement; under Ciolacu, Romania reached the highest external debt, while inflation reached 7.3%, the highest in the European Union (where the average was 3.1%), and the second-highest in all of Europe, only behind Turkey (as of February 2024). In the 2024 The Economist Democracy Index, Romania was downgraded from flawed democracy to a hybrid regime, becoming the only EU country to be classified as such.

On 25 November 2024, following his defeat in the first round of that year's presidential election, Ciolacu announced his resignation as leader of the Social Democratic Party but he ultimately did not resign as he was given a vote of confidence to maintain party leadership. Following the 2024 Romanian parliamentary election on 1 December, he was nominated to form the new government and remain in office as Prime Minister that had lasted for almost half a year more.

== Early life and education ==
Marcel Ciolacu was born in the city of Buzău, Romania as the son of Ion Ciolacu, a career military pilot in the Romanian Air Force, native to Oltenia, southern Romania. His mother's family is native to Tecuci, Western Moldavia, north-eastern Romania.

In 1995 he obtained a law degree from the Ecological University of Bucharest, which was authorised in May 1995. In 2008 he attended a program in Security and National Defence at the National College of Defence in Bucharest, a controversial university, regarded by some Romanian publications as a diploma mill.

In 2012 he completed a master's programme in the Management of the Public Sector at the National University of Political Studies and Public Administration.

== Political career ==
=== Early political activity ===
Marcel Ciolacu participated in the 1989 Romanian Revolution in Buzău, but a recent investigation by independent news organisation Recorder has put these claims under scrutiny, having revealed a series of inconsistencies in his account and the lack of supporting evidence for his participation in the 1989 Romanian Revolution. He became a member of the National Salvation Front in 1990. During the early nineties, Ciolacu climbed the steps in local politics, and by 1996, had become the second-in-command of the Youth Organisation of the party. Senator Ion Vasile became the godfather of his child. He remained little known, however, until the mid-2000s. In 2005, he was for several months the interim prefect of Buzau, after which he became, in turn, director of Urbis Serv and deputy mayor of Buzau (2008–2012), while Constantin Boșcodeală was mayor of Buzau (1996–2016). Boșcodeală was later convicted in 2015 for abuse of office during the period 2002–2008, by diverting public funds to a football team and other private companies of which he was a shareholder.

Ciolacu entered national politics in 2012, when he was first elected for a deputy seat in Parliament. In 2015, he was elected PSD president for Buzău County, replacing Boșcodeală who stepped down while being investigated. Ciolacu's election was controversial. He ran against Senator Vasile Ion, who eventually withdrew from the race, accusing Ciolacu of rigging the internal elections. Ciolacu was re-elected to Parliament in 2016.

=== Deputy Prime Minister ===
In 2017, Ciolacu was named deputy prime minister in the cabinet led by Mihai Tudose. Tudose's predecessor, Sorin Grindeanu was ousted from his position by a vote of no-confidence initiated by PSD itself, then under the leadership of Liviu Dragnea. Grindeanu's departure did not leave Dragnea's power unquestioned. Previously, the government had held a 295 majority, now it was reduced to a mere 241. For the first time, Dragnea was facing strong dissent in the party at the prospect that President Klaus Iohannis would not name another PSD member to become prime minister, electing instead to force early elections. Since the procedure of calling early elections laid down in the Constitution of Romania is complicated and difficult to trigger, and seeing PSD still had the necessary majority to form another government, the president decided to name Mihai Tudose, Dragnea's newest proposal, as prime minister. Tudose was not, however, Dragnea's first choice and, the PSD leader needed to find ways to control him better than Grindeanu, who had shown him that the office of prime minister was strong enough to allow its holder to wrestle his power in the party away from him. For this reason, Ciolacu was named deputy prime minister in the Tudose Cabinet, in order to become Dragnea's ears in the government.

Like Tudose himself and Grindeanu before him, however, Ciolacu did not stay loyal to Dragnea for long. By the autumn of 2017, Ciolacu had entered Tudose's grasp and was now fully loyal to the prime minister. The relationship between Tudose and Dragnea started deteriorating rapidly, as had been the case with Grindeanu, but the two maintained publicly that there was no strain between them. By then, Ciolacu was firmly in the Tudose camp.

Tudose soon declared publicly that there was only one person whom he would not tolerate being removed from his cabinet: Ciolacu. In January 2018, Tudose attempted to take full control of his government by asking the resignation of his Interior Minister, Carmen Dan, a Dragnea mouthpiece and loyal lieutenant. As it became quite apparent that this was another power struggle between the prime minister and the leader of the PSD, Ciolacu publicly positioned himself in the Tudose camp. Dragnea once again convened a special party meeting in order to force Tudose's resignation. Seeing that a majority of the party remained loyal to Dragnea, Tudose decided to resign to evade a motion of no confidence like his predecessor. Ciolacu handed in his own resignation from the government shortly thereafter.

=== President of the Chamber of Deputies ===
After leaving the Executive, Ciolacu returned to his deputy seat in Parliament. Throughout 2018 and the first half of 2019, he stayed out of the spotlight while persisting in the opposition against Dragnea's leadership. In October 2018, the press reported an alleged physical altercation in Parliament between Ciolacu and Dragnea, but both denied the claim.

On 27 May 2019, Liviu Dragnea was convicted of abuse of power and sentenced to three years and six months in prison. This vacated his position as President of the Chamber of Deputies and his leadership position in the party. Ciolacu emerged once more in the public eye, seeking a path to top party leadership. The party's new leader, Viorica Dăncilă, the third prime minister named by Dragnea, was now looking for ways to cement her leadership of the party. For this, she sought the support of Ciolacu and other former opponents of Dragnea. Ciolacu accepted her offer to sponsor him as president of the Chamber of Deputies, succeeding Dragnea himself. On 29 May 2019, Ciolacu was voted the new head of the Chamber. However, his election was won only narrowly and with the support of the PSD-breakaway party, PRO Romania, and its member, former Prime Minister Mihai Tudose.

On 13th November 2021, Ciolacu was elected as speaker for the second and held the position for one and a half year when he became the Prime Minister of Romania.

=== Leader of the Social Democratic Party ===
As leader of the Lower Chamber, Ciolacu kept a reserved and non-vocal stance. In October 2019, a motion of no confidence was initiated by the PNL-led opposition that successfully removed Dăncilă from power, even though Ciolacu maintained that the Dăncilă Cabinet would not fall. He supported Viorica Dăncilă's bid to the presidency of Romania but after her defeat and her historically weak result, Ciolacu went on to take control of the party.

On 25 November 2019, one day after the presidential election, Marcel Ciolacu personally visited Dăncilă at her home, event at which has been speculated in the Press Marcel Ciolacu asked her to resign from the party's leadership, offering her an MP seat in the next legislative election but which has been denied by Ciolacu, Paul Stănescu and Dăncilă herself. On 26 November, after a six hour long meeting of the Executive Committee of PSD, Viorica Dăncilă resigns as Party Leader, with Marcel Ciolacu acting as Leader and Paul Stănescu as General Secretary following this.

Ciolacu was expected to run for a full term as leader of PSD at its Congress on 29 February 2020, but the Congress was postponed to 21 March due to the emergence of COVID-19 pandemic in Romania. In early March, they announced plans to move the Congress online in light of the epidemic-related ban of gatherings of more than 1000 people. Ultimately, the Congress took place on 22 August 2020 and resulted in Ciolacu's election as leader of PSD, defeating Eugen Teodorovici on an overwhelming 1310–91 margin.

=== Prime Minister of Romania ===
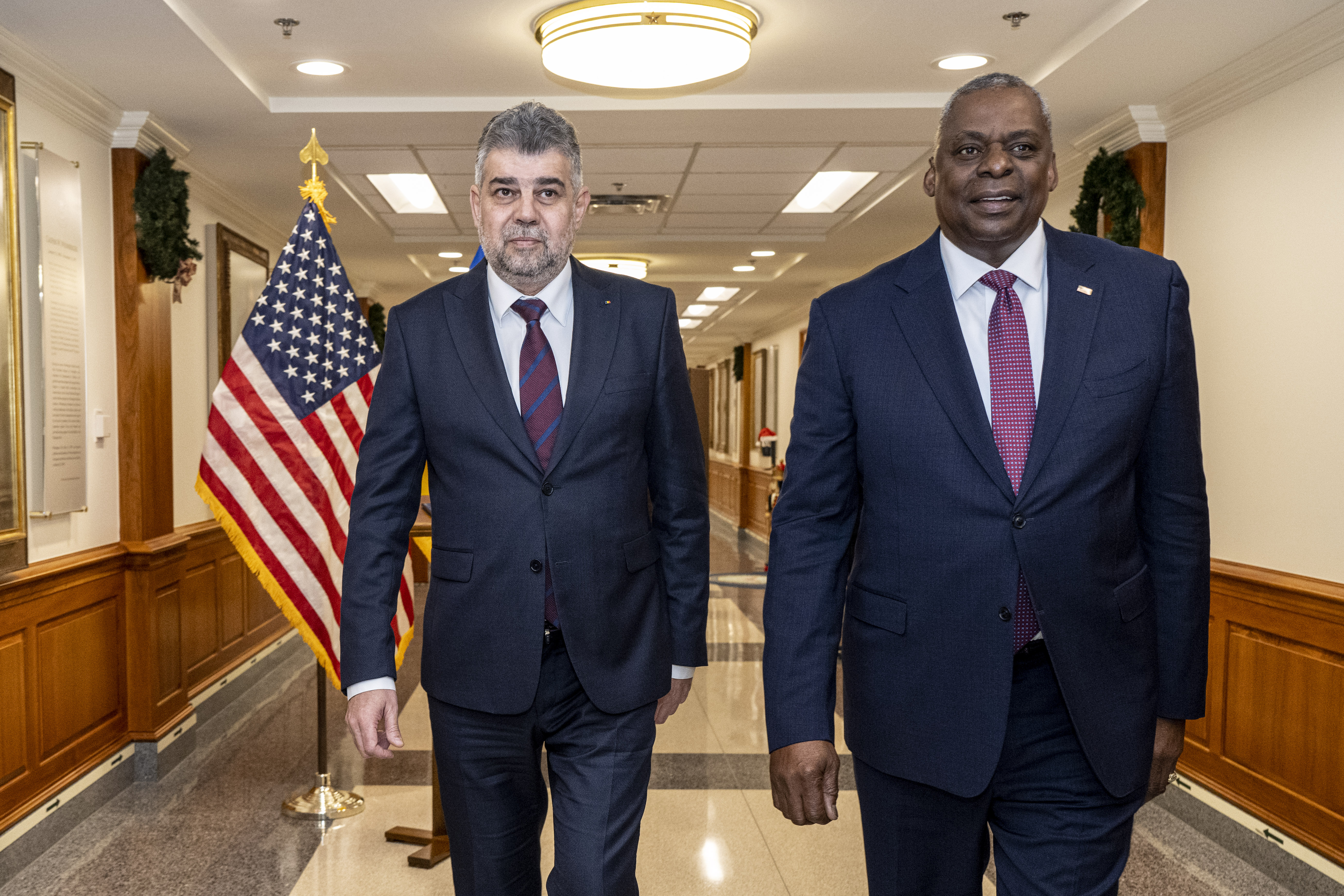
Ciolacu at the Pentagon with US Defence Secretary Lloyd Austin, 4 December 2023

Marcel Ciolacu assumed the office of Prime Minister of Romania on 15 June, in accordance with an informal rotational government agreement with the National Liberal Party in 2023.

On 2 September 2024 the Ciolacu cabinet approved a legislative proposal to transfer one of Romania’s air defence systems to Ukraine following a series of aerial attacks by Russian forces.

Following the results of the 2025 Romanian presidential election, Ciolacu announced that the PSD would leave A.Ro, and resigned from the position of Prime Minister, which resulted in the collapse of the coalition. He also stood down as leader of the PSD.

=== 2024 presidential campaign ===
Ciolacu ran for president of Romania in the 2024 Romanian presidential election but narrowly failed to advance to the runoff by 2,740 votes after placing third in the first round of voting on 24 November with 19.15% of the vote. He was criticised for his usage of private jets during his campaign. After failing to advance to the runoff, he announced his resignation as leader of the Social Democratic Party. However, he will remain the Prime Minister until a new majority government is formed. Ciolacu subsequently endorsed Elena Lasconi in the runoff.

Following the results of the 2024 Romanian parliamentary election on 1 December and the annulment of the presidential election on 6 December, Ciolacu was asked by President Klaus Iohannis to remain as prime minister and lead the new government.

=== Post-premiership ===
On 7 December 2025, Ciolacu was elected as President of the County Board of Buzău.

== Controversies ==
=== Mecan Construct investigation ===
In 2009, the Court of Accounts Buzau found that a construction company in the municipality of Buzau, Urbis Serv, headed by Marcel Ciolacu between 2007 and 2008, caused an approximately €1.3 million overcharge for street and sidewalk construction projects through an illegal contract with a company owned by a party colleague. The company, Mecan Construct, was owned by former PSD County Councilor Dumitru Dobrică.

Ciolacu was accused of conflict of interest causing damages to the municipality by inflating the Mecan contract by approximately 1.3 million euros.

Marcel Ciolacu stated that the ruling of the Buzău Court of Accounts was challenged in court. He stated that a criminal investigation file at the National Anticorruption Directorate Ploiești, in which the allegations regarding the contract with Mecan Construct were investigated, concluded without starting criminal proceedings against him.

=== Relationship with Omar Hayssam ===
Marcel Ciolacu was involved in a media scandal in May 2015 after a 10+ years old photograph of him with Omar Hayssam appeared in the press. In the early 2000's, Ciolacu and Hayssam had been attending a hunting party organised by the Buzău Forestry Directorate. In 2006, Omar Hayssam masterminded the kidnapping and holding for ransom of three Romanian journalists in Iraq, for which Hayssam was convicted in 2007 by the Bucharest Court of Appeal to 24 years, four months imprisonment. In addition, there was evidence that Ciolacu appeared on a list of Hayssam's debtors: In the early 2000s, Hayssam appears to have loaned Ciolacu 200 million old lei (20,000 RON). As a result of the scandal, Prime Minister at that time Victor Ponta removed Ciolacu from the position of honorary adviser to the prime minister.

== Political positions ==
A self-proclaimed supporter of economic patriotism, Ciolacu has been described as adhering to the ideology of nationalism and social conservatism. He opposes same-sex marriage, civil partnerships and social progressivism. He supports left-wing economic policies and right-wing social policies.

== Personal life ==
Marcel Ciolacu owns a pastry shop and a consulting firm. He married his wife, Roxana, a chemical engineer, in the 1990s, they have one son, Filip. His partner since then has been Sorina Docuz, with whom he is rumoured to have a relationship since 2021, former Miss Buzău and former wife of politician Robert Negoiță. Since the beginning of the relationship between Ciolacu and Docuz, the latter's sister, Elena Arghir, became a member of the Council of Administration of the Romanian Lottery, at the request of the PSD. Former PSD Finance Minister Eugen Teodorovici declared for the Romanian press in February 2024 that Docuz and Ciolacu have a child. The PSD denied this.

Political offices
| Preceded by Liviu Dragnea | President of the Chamber of Deputies; 2019–2020 | Succeeded by Ludovic Orban |
| Preceded by Sorin Grindeanu; Acting | President of the Chamber of Deputies; 2021–2023 | Succeeded by Alfred-Robert Simonis; Acting |
| Preceded by Cătălin Predoiu; Acting | Prime Minister of Romania; 2023–2025 | Succeeded by Cătălin Predoiu; Acting |
Party political offices
| Preceded by Viorica Dăncilă | President of the Social Democratic Party; 2019–2025 | Succeeded by Sorin Grindeanu; Acting |
