= Viorica Dăncilă =

Romanian politician

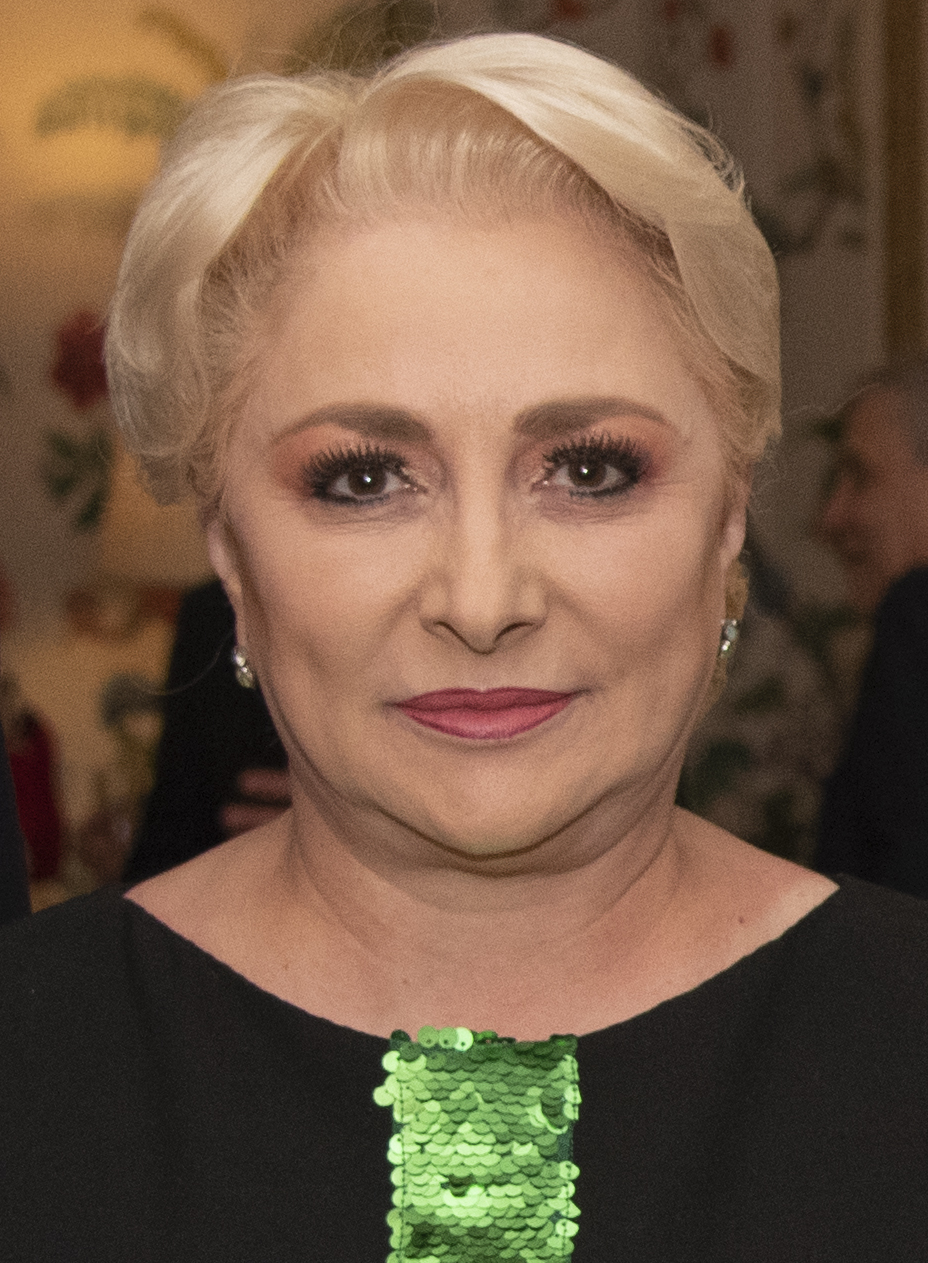
- Dăncilă in 2019

Prime Minister of Romania
- In office 29 January 2018 – 4 November 2019
- President: Klaus Iohannis
- Preceded by: Mihai Tudose
- Succeeded by: Ludovic Orban

President of the Social Democratic Party
- In office 27 May 2019 – 26 November 2019
- Preceded by: Liviu Dragnea
- Succeeded by: Marcel Ciolacu

President of Nation People Together
- In office 12 April 2022 – 11 September 2024
- Preceded by: Party established
- Succeeded by: Francesco-Ionel Şerban

Member of the European Parliament for Romania
- In office 21 January 2009 – 28 January 2018
- Succeeded by: Gabriela Zoană

Personal details
- Born: Vasilica Viorica Nica; 16 December 1963 (age 62) Roșiorii de Vede, Romania
- Other political affiliations: PNCR (2024); PSD (1996–2022); NOI (2022–2024)
- Spouse: Cristinel Dăncilă
- Children: 1
- Education: Petroleum-Gas University; National University of Political Studies and Public Administration

Vasilica Viorica Dăncilă (Note: Romanian pronunciation: [vasiˈlika vi.oˈrika dənˈt͡ʃilə]) (born 16 December 1963) is a Romanian politician, former leader of the Social Democratic Party (PSD), and was Prime Minister of Romania from 29 January 2018 to 4 November 2019. She is the first and only woman in Romanian history to hold both the office of Prime Minister and that of president of PSD. In 2014, she was elected to a second term as a Member of the European Parliament (MEP), representing the PSD. She was also president of the Social Democratic Women's Organization (OFSD) between 2015 and 2018.

Dăncilă became a member of the Social Democratic Party (PSD) in 1996, as part of the party's organization in Teleorman County. Over the years she has held several positions in both PSD and the local administration. She was a local council and a county councilor until 2009, when she was elected to her first term as an MEP. Also she occupied several leadership positions in the party, as president of the local organization, vice president of PSD Teleorman and president of OFSD Teleorman. In 2022, she resigned from the PSD to join the then-newly founded party Nation People Together, of which she became president. She joined the Romanian National Conservative Party in September 2024.

Before entering politics Dăncilă was an engineer with Petrom SA, and prior to that a teacher at Videle Industrial High School.

== Biography ==
Vasilica Viorica Dăncilă (née Nica) was born on 16 December 1963 in Roșiorii de Vede, Teleorman County. In 1988, she graduated from the Faculty of Drilling of Wells and Exploitation of Hydrocarbon Deposits of the Institute of Petroleum and Gas in Ploiești. In 2006 Dăncilă obtained the master in European Public Space at the National School of Political and Administrative Studies in Bucharest.

== Political career ==
=== In the European Parliament ===
In 2009, Viorica Dăncilă was elected on the lists of the Social Democratic Party (PSD) for her first term as a member of the European Parliament and then sat as a member of the Progressive Alliance of Socialists and Democrats group. During the 5-year term, she did not draft any report as a rapporteur (primary legislator).

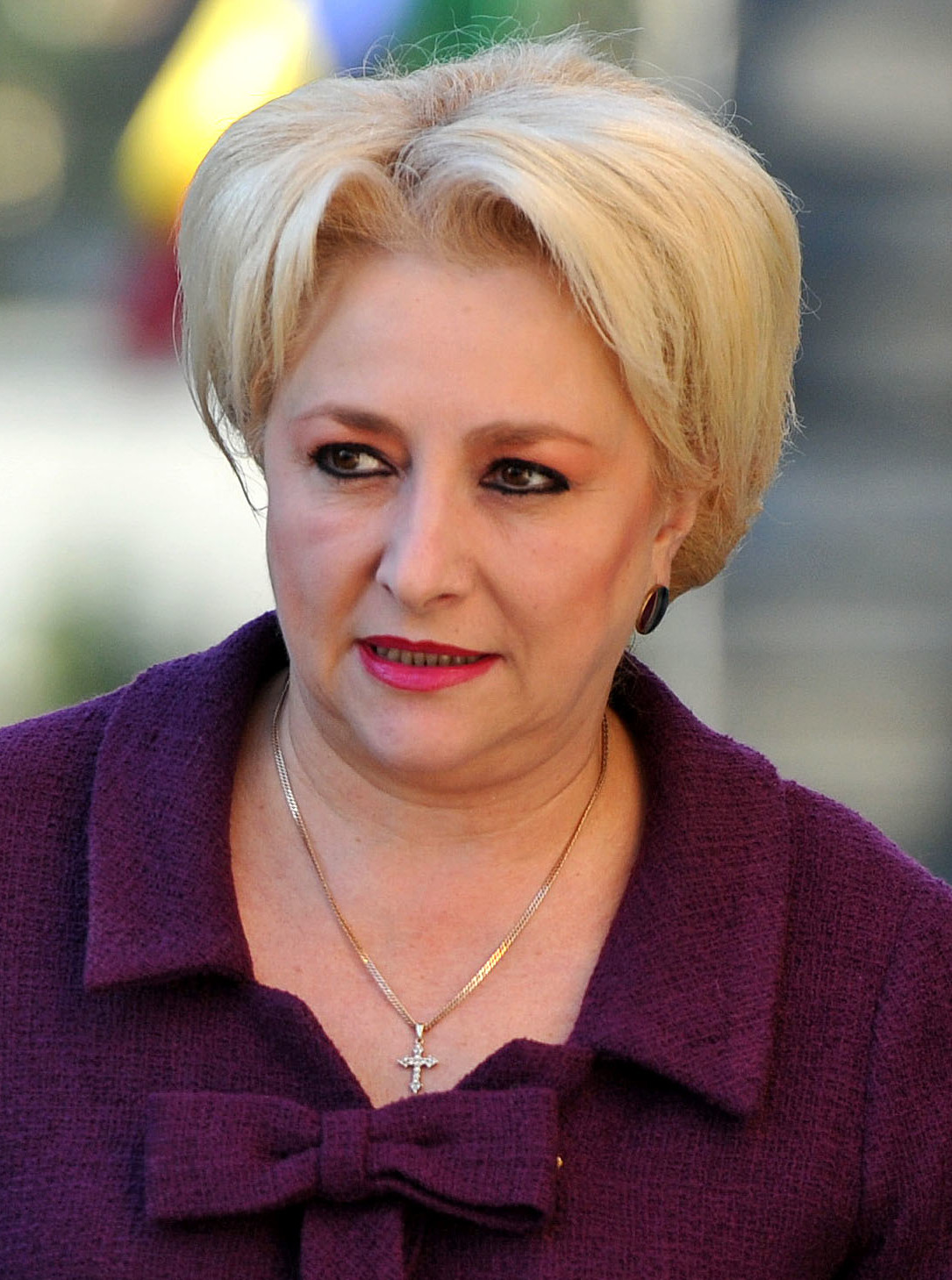
Viorica Dăncilă at the National Council of the Social Democratic Pensioners' Organization (December 2014)

In 2014, Viorica Dăncilă was elected for another term as MEP on the Social Democratic Party's list. She was also the leader of the Romanian Social Democrat delegation in the EP and a vice chair of the European Parliament's Committee on Agriculture and Rural Development. She was also a full member of the Committee on Women's Rights and Gender Equality and a substitute member of the Committee on Regional Development.

In 2015, she was shortlisted for the MEP Awards, in the Agriculture category. Two years later, in 2017, she was again nominated, in two separate categories: Women's Rights & Gender Equality and Research & Innovation.

She officially left the European Parliament on 28 January 2018 to take up the position of prime minister in Romania.

=== In the Social Democratic Women's Organization ===
In 2015, social democratic women proposed a Pact to the national political forces which aimed to protect women from domestic violence. This was an initiative of Viorica Dăncilă, then the acting chairwoman of the organization, brought up at the OFSD Summer School in Mamaia, on 28–30 August.

In October 2015, she was elected President of the Social Democratic Women's Organization. As President of OFSD, Viorica Dăncilă asked PSD leaders to ensure a quota of at least 30% female candidates on the lists of the Social Democratic Party during elections. The proposal was approved by the PSD leadership.

=== Prime Minister and aftermath ===
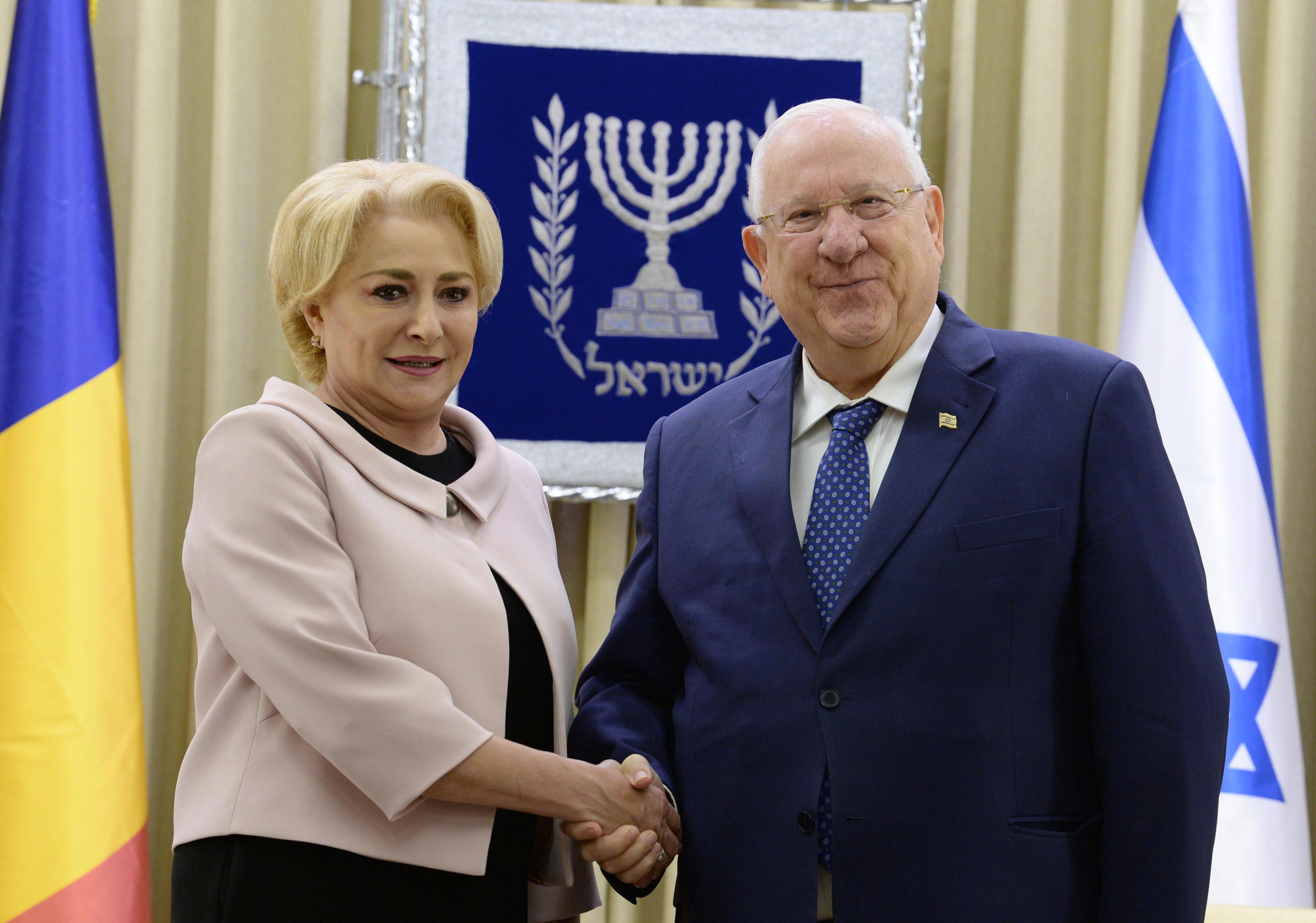
Viorica Dăncilă meeting Israeli President Reuven Rivlin in April 2018

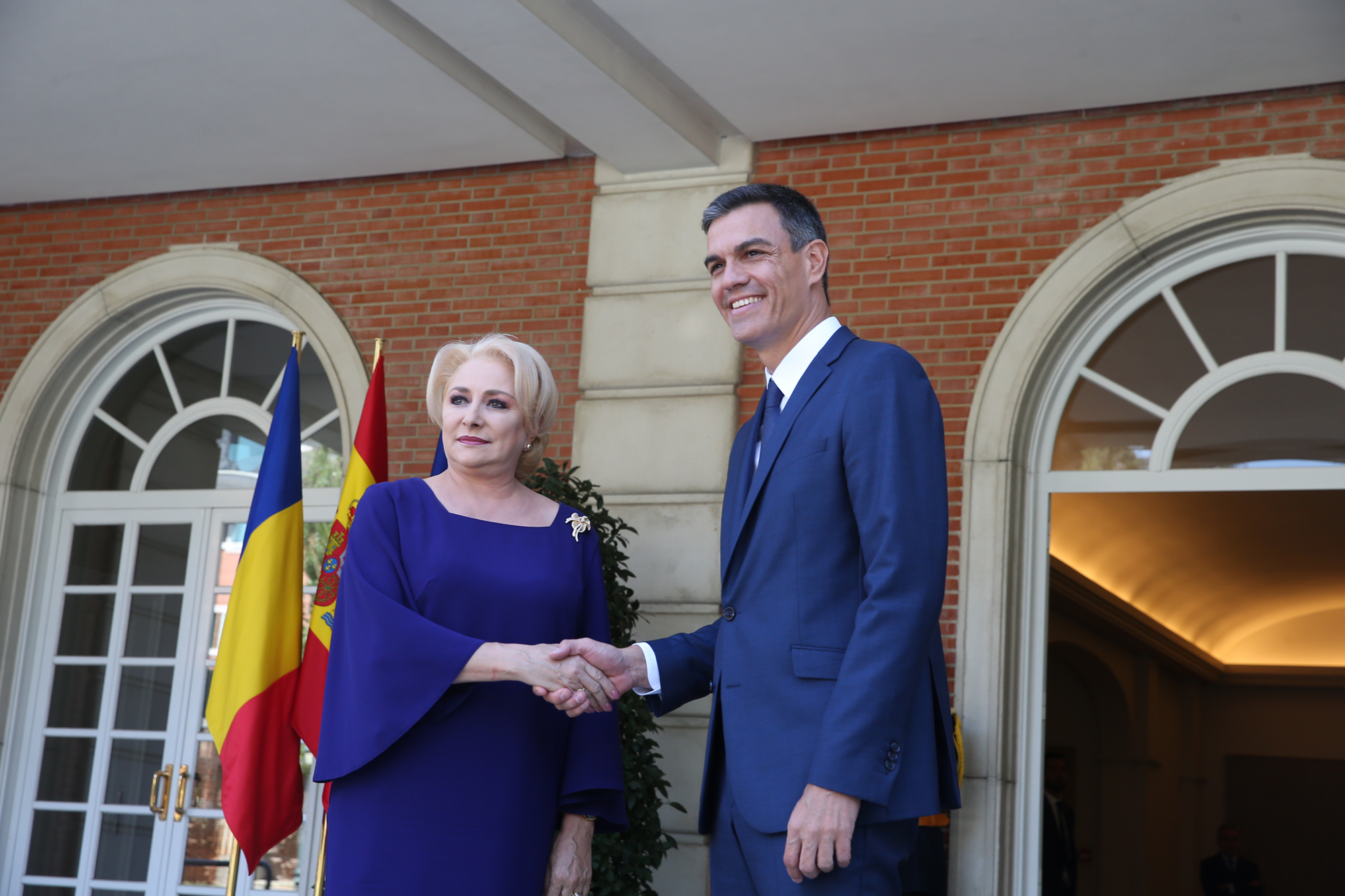
Viorica Dăncilă meeting Spanish Prime Minister Pedro Sánchez in September 2018

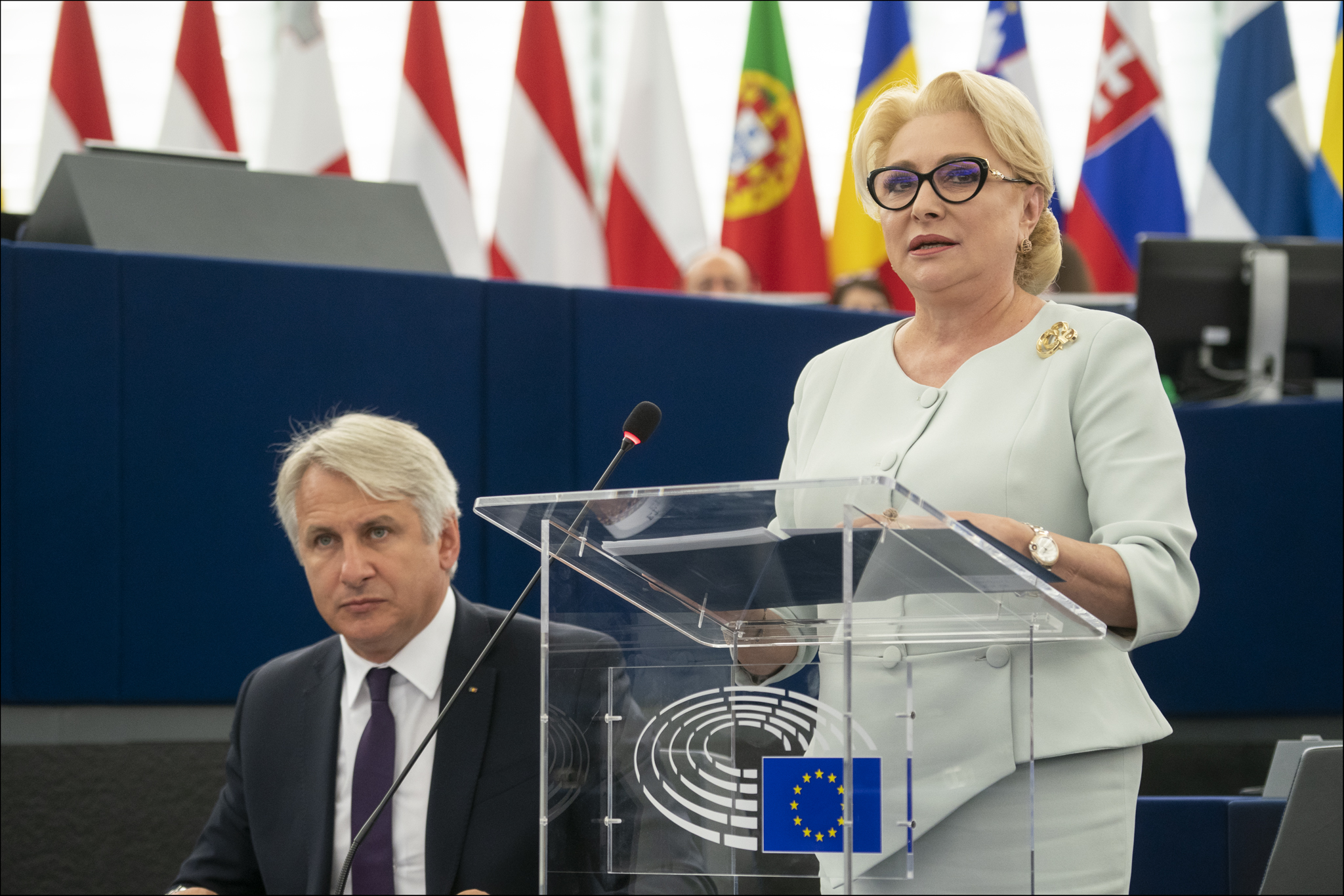
Viorica Dăncilă in the European Parliament after the 2019 Romanian Presidency of the Council of the European Union (July 2019)

On 17 January 2018, President of the Social Democratic Party Liviu Dragnea nominated Viorica Dăncilă as Romania's first female prime minister and the country's third head of government in a year. Her predecessor, Mihai Tudose, resigned on 15 January after his own party withdrew its backing. President Klaus Iohannis accepted PSD's nomination and appointed Dăncilă as prime minister-designate in a move harshly criticized by his supporters and main opposition parties. Her cabinet received the vote of confidence from Parliament on 29 January.

She was ousted as prime minister on 10 October 2019, following a vote of no confidence. She remained as a caretaker of the office until the formation of a new government.

In March 2022, after an over 2-year brief break from politics, she announced her resignation from the PSD in order to become a member of a newly founded (at the time) party, called the Nation People Together (NOI), of which she became president three month later.

Dăncilă joined Cristian Terheș' Romanian National Conservative Party in September 2024.

== Controversies ==
In February 2018, Dăncilă was in center of a discrimination scandal. She catalogued the MEP's who "misinform the EU" with regard to changes to the justice laws as "autistic". Soon after, the Association of Parents of Children with Autism claimed that the use of the term "autistic" with a profoundly negative meaning in a political dispute is an offense to those with this condition. Moreover, the National Council for Combating Discrimination began the hearing procedures of Viorica Dăncilă for her perceived discriminatory comments. She later apologized for the statement and said that, through the comparison, she did not want to insult people with autism spectrum disorders.

She was also criticized for showing a lack of knowledge for proper grammar in Romanian, a lack of verbal fluidity, poor knowledge of terms and subjects related to her tasks. The rector of the University of Bucharest and former Minister of Education, Mircea Dumitru, characterized her language as "hard to understand" and "full of syntactic construction errors and logical inconsistencies."

After repeatedly avoiding meetings and phone conversations on domestic and international issues with President Klaus Iohannis, the latter asked her to resign, arguing that she "does not cope with the position of prime minister and turns the Government into a vulnerability of Romania." Moreover, Iohannis accused Dăncilă of obeying "orders from the party" and announced that he withdrew his confidence in her.

On May 17, 2018, Ludovic Orban, leader of the main opposition party, the National Liberal Party (PNL), filed a criminal complaint against Dăncilă for high treason and usurping of official qualities about the transfer of the Romanian embassy from Tel Aviv to Jerusalem without the consent and approval of President Klaus Iohannis. One month later, on June 28, 2018, the Directorate for Investigating Organised Crime and Terrorism (DIICOT) announced that it had started the in rem investigation into the matter. On September 28, 2018, DIICOT announced it concluded the investigation and closed the case on the basis of lack of evidence in support of the accusation, stating that the high treason never occurred.

In July 2018, during a meeting with the prime minister of Montenegro, Duško Marković, she confused the capital of the country, Podgorica, with Pristina, the capital of Kosovo, which is not recognized as an independent nation by Romania.

== March of the Living ==
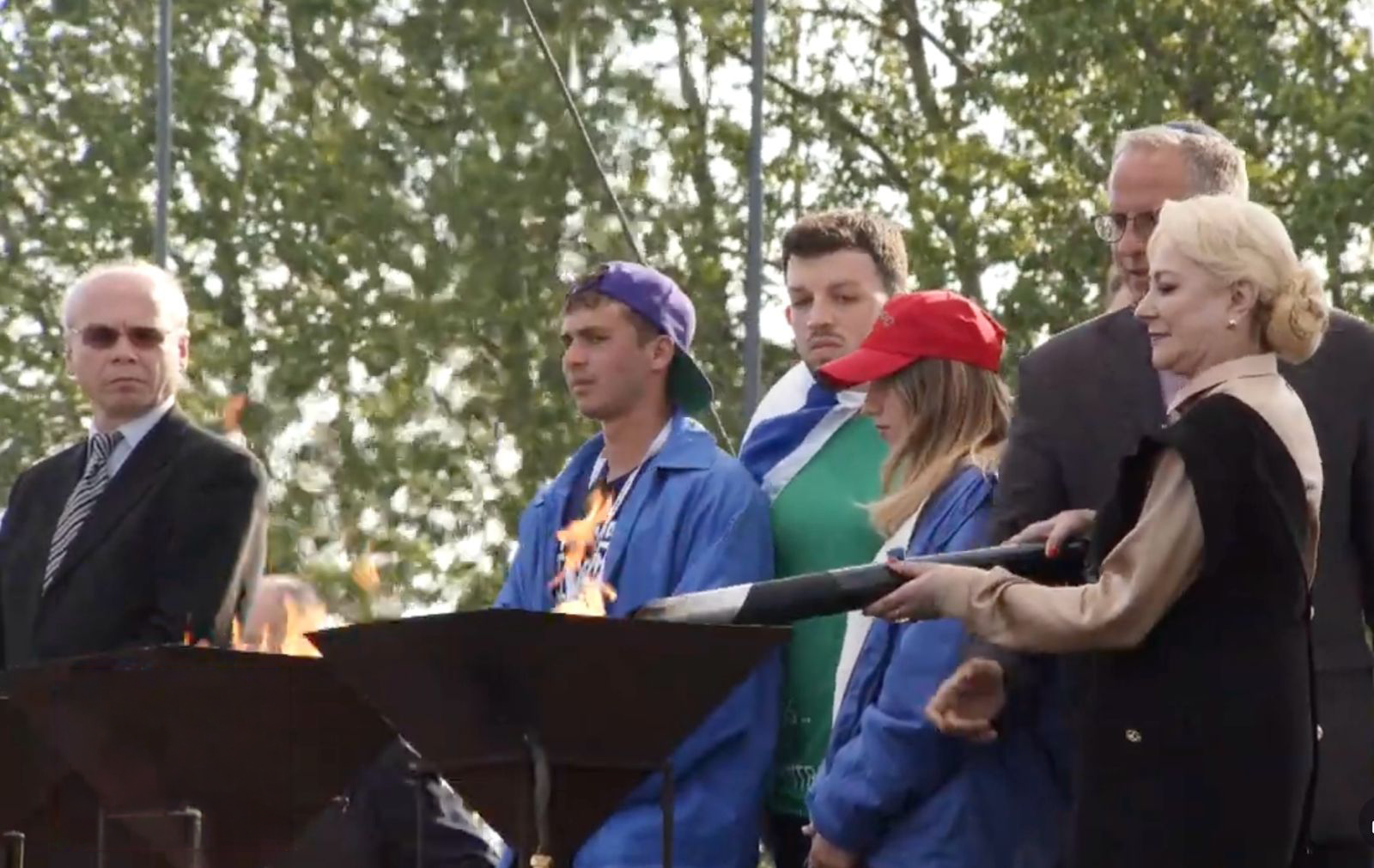
Vasilica Viorica Dăncilă, Prime Minister of Romania and President of United Council, at the 2019 March of the Living, where she lit a torch in memory of the more than 1 million Jewish children who were murdered in the Holocaust. Dariusz Stola (left).

In May 2019, while serving as Prime Minister of Romania, Dăncilă participated in the 28th annual March of the Living at Auschwitz-Birkenau in southern Poland, an international Holocaust remembrance event that brings together survivors, students, diplomats and world leaders to honor the victims and reaffirm the pledge of “never again.” Her attendance was to underline Romania's engagement in Holocaust commemoration and the broader fight against antisemitism. At Birkenau on Yom HaShoah, she lit the third torch in memory of the murdered of more than 1 million Jewish children in the Holocaust.

== Personal life ==
Viorica Dăncilă is married to Cristinel Dăncilă, manager at an oil company and former councillor in the Teleorman County Council. She has an adopted son, Victor.

== Electoral history ==
=== Presidential elections ===
Election	Affiliation	First round			Second round		
Election	Affiliation	Votes	Percentage	Position	Votes	Percentage	Position
2019	PSD	2,051,725	22.3%	2nd	3,339,922	33.91%	2nd

== See also ==
- Dăncilă Cabinet

== Notes ==
Political offices
Preceded by Mihai Fifor; Acting	Prime Minister of Romania; 2018–2019	Succeeded by Ludovic Orban
Party political offices
Preceded by Liviu Dragnea	President of the Social Democratic Party; 2019	Succeeded by Marcel Ciolacu; Acting
