= Nation People Together =

Nation People Together Națiune Oameni Împreună
- Abbreviation: NOI (meaning "us" in Romanian)
- President: Francesco-Ionel Şerban
- Secretary-General: Cornelia Baloș
- Founded: 13 January 2022
- Headquarters: Cluj-Napoca
- Ideology: Romanian nationalism Social conservatism Pacifism; Sovereigntism; Europeanism
- Political position: Center-left
- Colours: Purple
- Slogan: Noi credem în România. Credeți în noi! ("We believe in Romania. Believe in us!")
- Anthem: "Cât trăim pe acest pământ" "As long as we live on this earth"

Website
- partidulnoi.ro

Nation People Together (Romanian: Națiune Oameni Împreună, NOI) is a political party in Romania, founded on 13 January 2022 by Bogdan Petrescu, along with three other people. The party is largely associated with former president of the Social Democratic Party (PSD) and Prime Minister Viorica Dăncilă, who became NOI's president on 12 April 2022 on a 247–2 vote.

== See also ==
- Politics of Romania
