= Marius Dunca =

Romanian politician (born 1980)

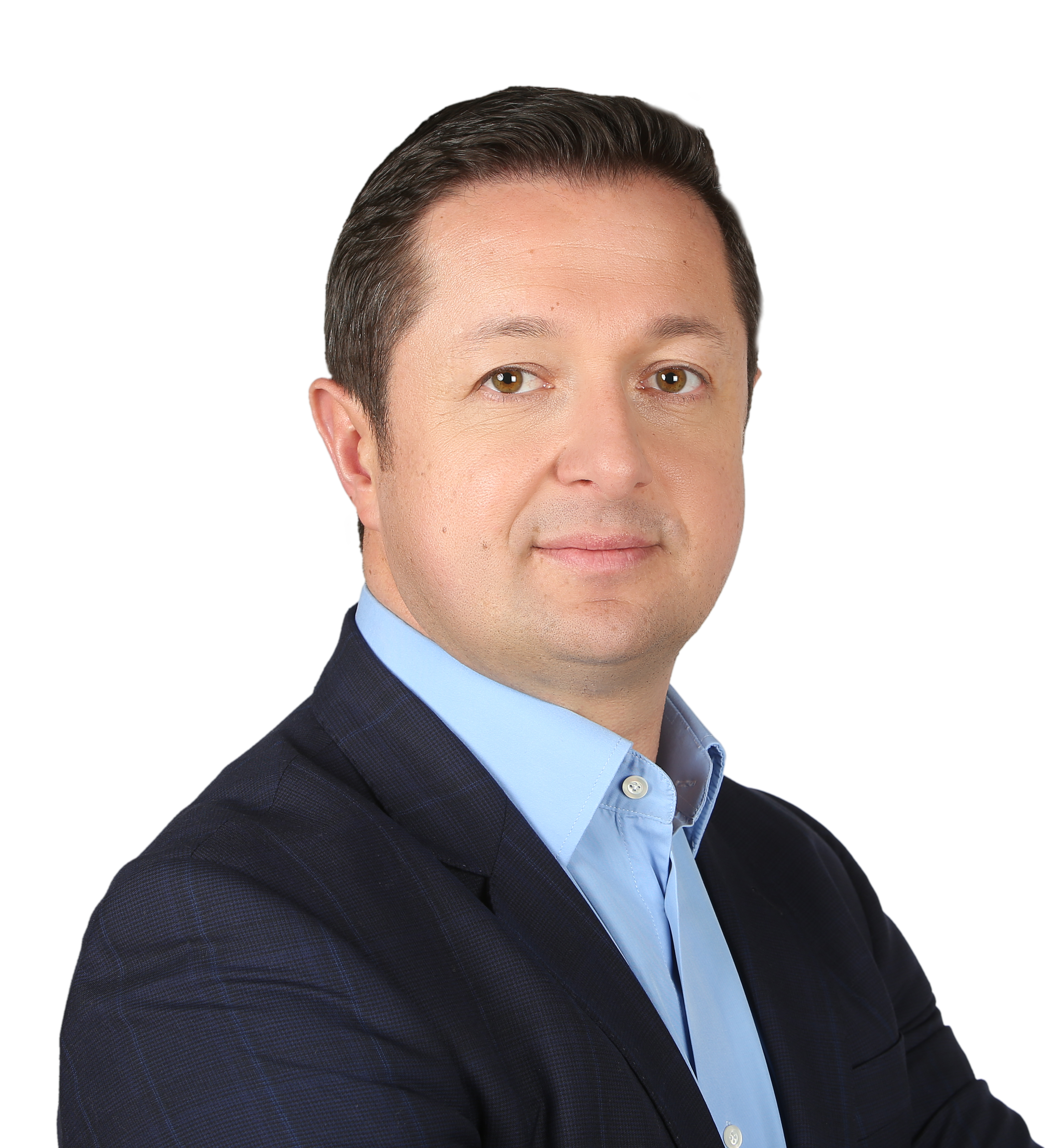
- Dunca in 2016

Member of the Senate
- Incumbent
- Assumed office 21 December 2016
- Constituency: Brașov

Minister of Youth and Sports
- In office 4 January 2017 – 29 January 2018
- Prime Minister: Sorin Grindeanu; Mihai Tudose
- Preceded by: Elisabeta Lipă
- Succeeded by: Ioana Bran

Personal details
- Born: 19 July 1980 (age 45)
- Party: Social Democratic Party

Marius-Alexandru Dunca (born 19 July 1980) is a Romanian politician of the Social Democratic Party serving as a member of the Senate. He was first elected in the 2016 parliamentary election, and was re-elected in 2020. From 2017 to 2018, he served as minister of youth and sports.
