= Grindeanu cabinet =

Romanian government cabinet

Grindeanu Cabinet
- 126th Cabinet of Romania

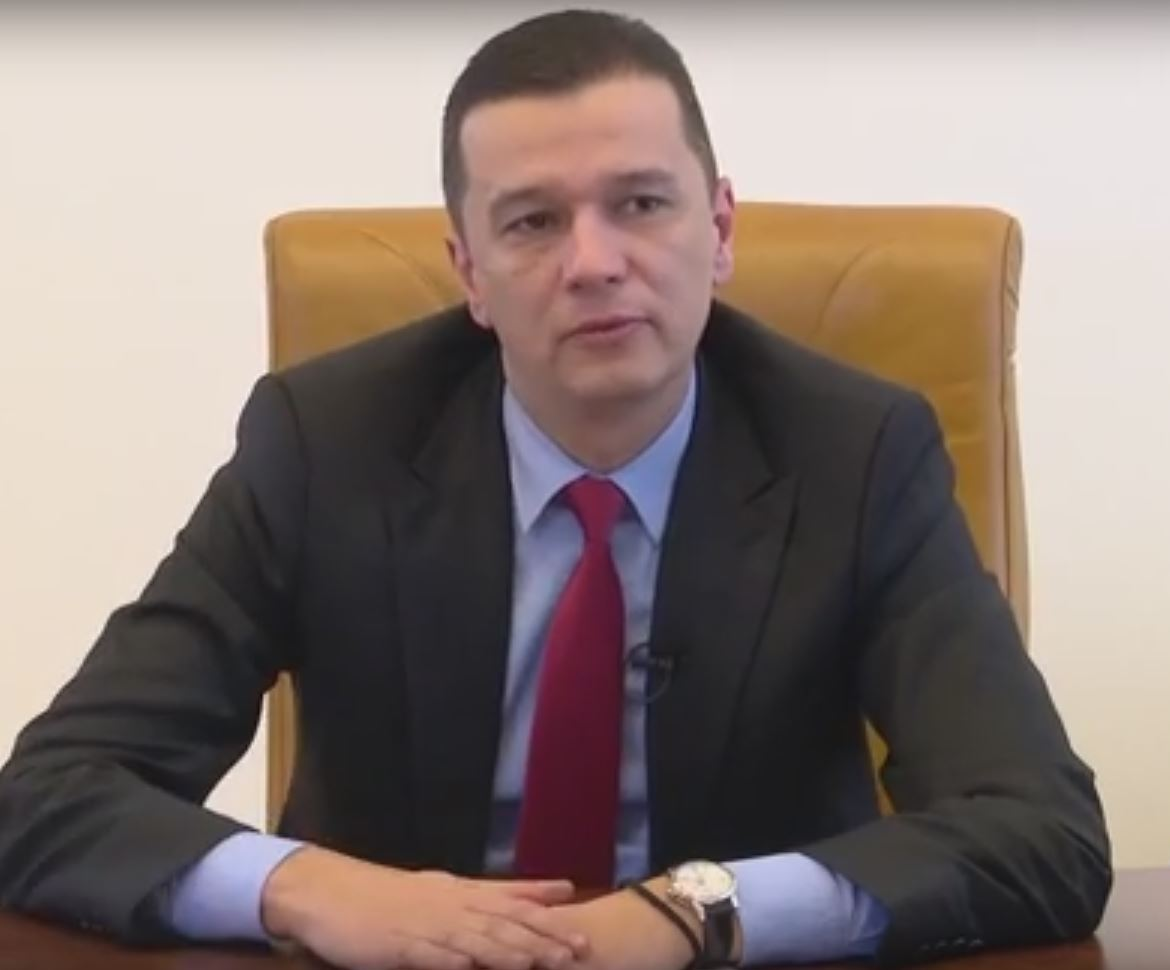
- Sorin Grindeanu, head of government
- Date formed: 4 January 2017
- Date dissolved: 29 June 2017

People and organisations
- Head of state: Klaus Iohannis
- Head of government: Sorin Grindeanu
- Member party: PSD, ALDE
- Status in legislature: Coalition (Majority)
- Opposition party: PNL, USR, PMP

History
- Election: 2016
- Legislature term: 2016–20
- Predecessor: Cioloș
- Successor: Tudose

The Grindeanu cabinet was the 126th government of Romania, formed after the 2016 legislative election. It was led by Sorin Grindeanu, who assumed office as Prime Minister on 4 January until the end of his term on 29 June 2017. The cabinet was dismissed after a motion of no confidence initiated by the Social Democratic Party (PSD), the same party from which Grindeanu stemmed.

== Membership ==
Position	Minister	Party	Date sworn in	Left office
Prime Minister	Sorin Grindeanu	PSD	4 January 2017	29 June 2017
Deputy Prime Minister and Minister of Regional Development, Public Administration and European Funds	Sevil Shhaideh	PSD	4 January 2017	14 June 2017
Deputy Prime Minister and Minister of Regional Development, Public Administration and European Funds	Augustin Jianu	PSD	16 June 2017	29 June 2017
Deputy Prime Minister and Minister of Environment and Climate Change	Daniel Constantin	ALDE	4 January 2017	3 April 2017
Deputy Prime Minister and Minister of Environment and Climate Change	Grațiela-Leocadia Gavrilescu	ALDE	3 April 2017	14 June 2017
Minister of Internal Affairs	Carmen Daniela Dan	PSD	4 January 2017	14 June 2017
Minister of Public Finance	Viorel Ștefan	PSD	4 January 2017	14 June 2017
Minister of Agriculture and Rural Development	Petre Daea	PSD	4 January 2017	14 June 2017
Minister of Foreign Affairs	Teodor Meleșcanu	ALDE	4 January 2017	14 June 2017
Minister of National Defence	Gabriel-Beniamin Leș	PSD	4 January 2017	14 June 2017
Minister of Justice	Florin Iordache	PSD	4 January 2017	9 February 2017
Minister of Justice	Ana Birchall (acting)	PSD	9 February 2017	23 February 2017
Minister of Justice	Tudorel Toader	Ind.	23 February 2017	15 June 2017
Minister of Economy	Alexandru Petrescu	PSD	4 January 2017	23 February 2017
Minister of Economy	Mihai Tudose	PSD	23 February 2017	14 June 2017
Minister of Communications and Information Society	Augustin Jianu	PSD	4 January 2017	29 June 2017
Minister of Health	Florian-Dorel Bodog	PSD	4 January 2017	14 June 2017
Minister of National Education	Pavel Năstase	PSD	4 January 2017	14 June 2017
Minister of Labor, Family, and Social Protection	Lia Olguța Vasilescu	PSD	4 January 2017	14 June 2017
Minister of Transport and Infrastructure	Alexandru-Răzvan Cuc	PSD	4 January 2017	14 June 2017
Minister of Culture and National Patrimony	Ioan Vulpescu	PSD	4 January 2017	14 June 2017
Youth and Sports Minister	Marius-Alexandru Dunca	PSD	4 January 2017	14 June 2017
Minister of Energy	Toma-Florin Petcu	ALDE	4 January 2017	14 June 2017
Minister of Tourism	Mircea-Titus Dobre	PSD	4 January 2017	14 June 2017
Minister of Research and Innovation	Șerban-Constantin Valeca	PSD	4 January 2017	14 June 2017
Minister for Water and Forests	Adriana Petcu	PSD	4 January 2017	14 June 2017
Minister for Business, Trade and Entrepreneurship	Florin Nicolae Jianu	Ind.	4 January 2017	2 February 2017
Minister for Business, Trade and Entrepreneurship	Alexandru Petrescu	PSD	10 February 2017 (acting to 23 February 2017)	14 June 2017
Minister Delegate for Relations with Parliament	Grațiela-Leocadia Gavrilescu	ALDE	4 January 2017	3 April 2017
Minister Delegate for Relations with Parliament	Viorel Ilie	ALDE	3 April 2017	14 June 2017
Minister Delegate for Romanians Abroad	Andreea Păstârnac	PSD	4 January 2017	14 June 2017
Minister Delegate for European Funds	Mihaela-Virginia Toader	PSD	4 January 2017	23 February 2017
Minister Delegate for European Funds	Rovana Plumb	PSD	23 February 2017	14 June 2017
Minister Delegate for European Affairs	Ana Birchall	PSD	4 January 2017	14 June 2017
Minister Delegate for Social Dialogue	Gabriel Petrea	PSD	4 January 2017	14 June 2017
