= Mihai Fifor =

Romanian politician (born 1970)

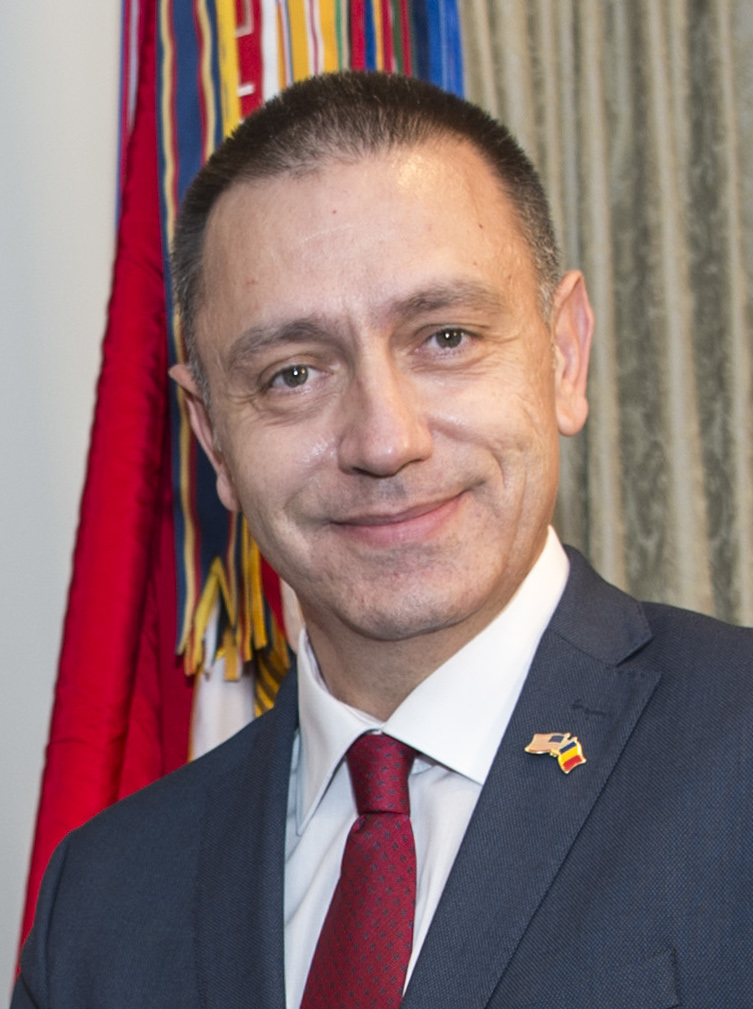
- Fifor in 2017

Prime Minister of Romania
- Acting; 16 January 2018 – 29 January 2018
- President: Klaus Iohannis
- Preceded by: Mihai Tudose
- Succeeded by: Viorica Dăncilă

Minister of Defence
- In office 12 September 2017 – 20 November 2018
- Prime Minister: Mihai Tudose; Viorica Dăncilă
- Preceded by: Adrian Țuțuianu
- Succeeded by: Gabriel Leș

Personal details
- Born: 10 May 1970 (age 56) Turnu Severin, Mehedinți County, Romania
- Party: Social Democratic Party (PSD)
- Education: University of Craiova

Mihai-Viorel Fifor (Note: Romanian pronunciation: [miˈhaj ˈfifor]) (born 10 May 1970) is a Romanian politician.

Born in Turnu Severin, he attended school in his native city, entering the University of Craiova in 1989. He graduated in 1994, with a degree in Romanian and English. The same institution awarded him a master's degree in Romanian literature the following year, and a doctorate in 2003, dealing with the Timok Romanians. In 2001, he became director of the Dolj County center for preserving and promoting traditional culture. In 2005, he was named head of the Oltenia regional museum.

A member of the Social Democratic Party (PSD), he was elected to the Senate in 2012, representing Dolj County. In 2016, he won another term, switching to Arad County. In June 2017, he became Economy Minister in the cabinet of Prime Minister Mihai Tudose. In September 2017 he became Defence Minister. He was reappointed to the same position in January 2018 in the Dăncilă Cabinet. He resigned from the Cabinet on 19 November 2018 to concentrate on party internal affairs and election-preparatory actions.
