= Dăncilă cabinet =

128th Government of Romania

Dăncilă Cabinet
- 128th Cabinet of Romania

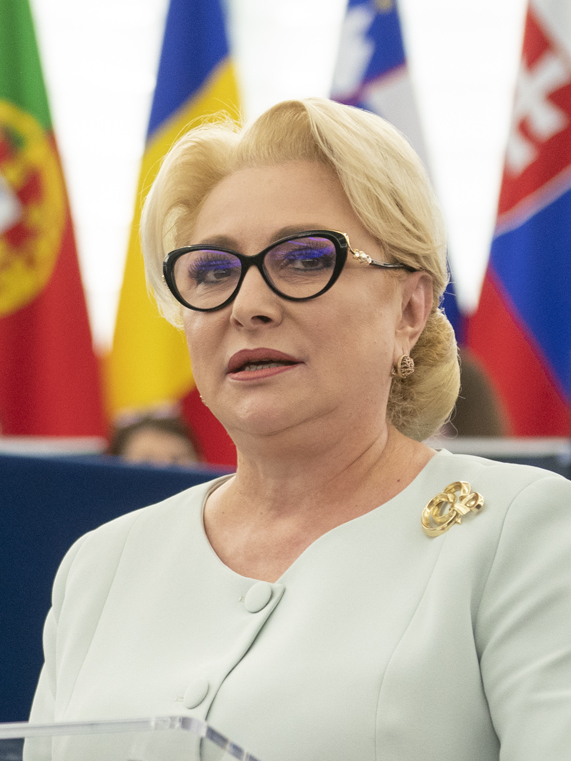
- Date formed: 29 January 2018
- Date dissolved: 4 November 2019

People and organisations
- Head of state: Klaus Iohannis
- Head of government: Viorica Dăncilă
- No. of ministers: 27
- Member parties: PSD; ALDE (January 2017–August 2019)
- Status in legislature: Coalition (Majority) (until August 2019); Minority government (August–November 2019)
- Opposition leaders: Ludovic Orban; Dan Barna; Traian Băsescu; Hunor Kelemen

History
- Outgoing election: 2016
- Legislature term: 2016–2020
- Predecessor: Tudose
- Successor: Orban

The Dăncilă Cabinet was the 128th Government of Romania. It was led by Viorica Dăncilă, who assumed office as Prime Minister of Romania along with her cabinet on 29 January 2018.

Led by Viorica Dăncilă, this cabinet was constituted and supported by a center-left coalition between the Social Democratic Party (PSD) and the Alliance of Liberals and Democrats (ALDE). Together, they had 167 deputies of 329, or 50.8% of seats in the Chamber of Deputies, and 76 senators from 136, or 55.9% of Senate seats.

On 26 January 2018, the composition of the government was announced. The government gained a vote of confidence on 29 January in Parliament with 282 votes in favor, 48 more than the constitutional majority required, thanks to the support of UDMR and deputies representing national minorities.

The government took office on 29 January after the resignation of the Social Democratic Tudose Cabinet. Dăncilă became the first woman to lead a government in Romania.

On 10 October 2019, a no-confidence vote to dissolve the Dăncilă Cabinet was adopted in Parliament with 238 votes in favour and 4 against.

Position	Minister	Party	Date sworn in	Left office
Prime Minister	Viorica Dăncilă	PSD	29 January 2018	4 November 2019
Deputy Prime Minister, Minister of Regional Development and Public Administration	Paul Stănescu	PSD	29 January 2018	4 November 2019
Deputy Prime Minister, Minister of Environment	Grațiela Gavrilescu	ALDE	29 January 2018	27 August 2019
Deputy Prime Minister without portfolio	Viorel Ștefan	PSD	29 January 2018	4 November 2019
Deputy Prime Minister, Minister for the Implementation of Strategic Partnerships of Romania	Ana Birchall	PSD	29 January 2018	4 November 2019
Minister of Internal Affairs	Carmen Dan	PSD	29 January 2018	15 July 2019
Minister of Public Finance	Eugen Teodorovici	PSD	29 January 2018	4 November 2019
Minister of Agriculture and Rural Development	Petre Daea	PSD	29 January 2018	4 November 2019
Minister of Foreign Affairs	Teodor Meleșcanu	ALDE	29 January 2018	15 July 2019
Minister of Foreign Affairs	Ramona Mănescu	Ind.	24 July 2019	4 November 2019
Minister of National Defense	Mihai Fifor	PSD	29 January 2018	20 November 2018
Minister of National Defense	Gabriel Leș	PSD	20 November 2018	4 November 2019
Minister of Justice	Tudorel Toader	Ind.	29 January 2018	24 April 2019
Minister of Justice	Ana Birchall	PSD	7 June 2019	4 November 2019
Minister of Economy	Dănuț Andrușcă	PSD	29 January 2018	4 November 2019
Minister of Communications and Information Society	Bogdan Cojocaru	PSD	29 January 2018	4 November 2019
Minister of Health	Sorina Pintea	PSD	29 January 2018	4 November 2019
Minister of Education	Valentin Popa	PSD	29 January 2018	4 November 2019
Minister of Labor and Social Justice	Lia Olguța Vasilescu	PSD	29 January 2018	20 November 2018
Minister of European Funds	Rovana Plumb	PSD	29 January 2018	4 November 2019
Minister of Transport and Infrastructure	Lucian Șova	PSD	29 January 2018	4 November 2019
Minister of Culture and National Identity	George Ivașcu (actor)	Ind.	29 January 2018	4 November 2019
Minister of Youth and Sports	Ioana Bran	PSD	29 January 2018	19 November 2018
Minister of Youth and Sports	Constantin-Bogdan Matei	PSD	20 November 2018	4 November 2019
Minister of Energy	Anton Anton	ALDE	29 January 2018	27 August 2019
Minister of Tourism	Bogdan Trif	PSD	29 January 2018	4 November 2019
Minister of Research and Innovation	Nicolae Burnete	PSD	29 January 2018	4 November 2019
Minister of Waters and Forests	Ioan Deneș	PSD	29 January 2018	4 November 2019
Minister for the Business Environment, Commerce and Entrepreneurship	Radu Oprea	PSD	29 January 2018	4 November 2019
Minister-delegate for Relations with Parliament	Viorel Ilie	ALDE	29 January 2018	27 August 2019
Minister-delegate for Romanians Abroad	Natalia Intotero	PSD	29 January 2018	4 November 2019
Minister-delegate for European Affairs	Victor Negrescu	PSD	29 January 2018	4 November 2019
