= Mihai Tudose =

Romanian politician (born 1967)

Mihai Tudose MEP
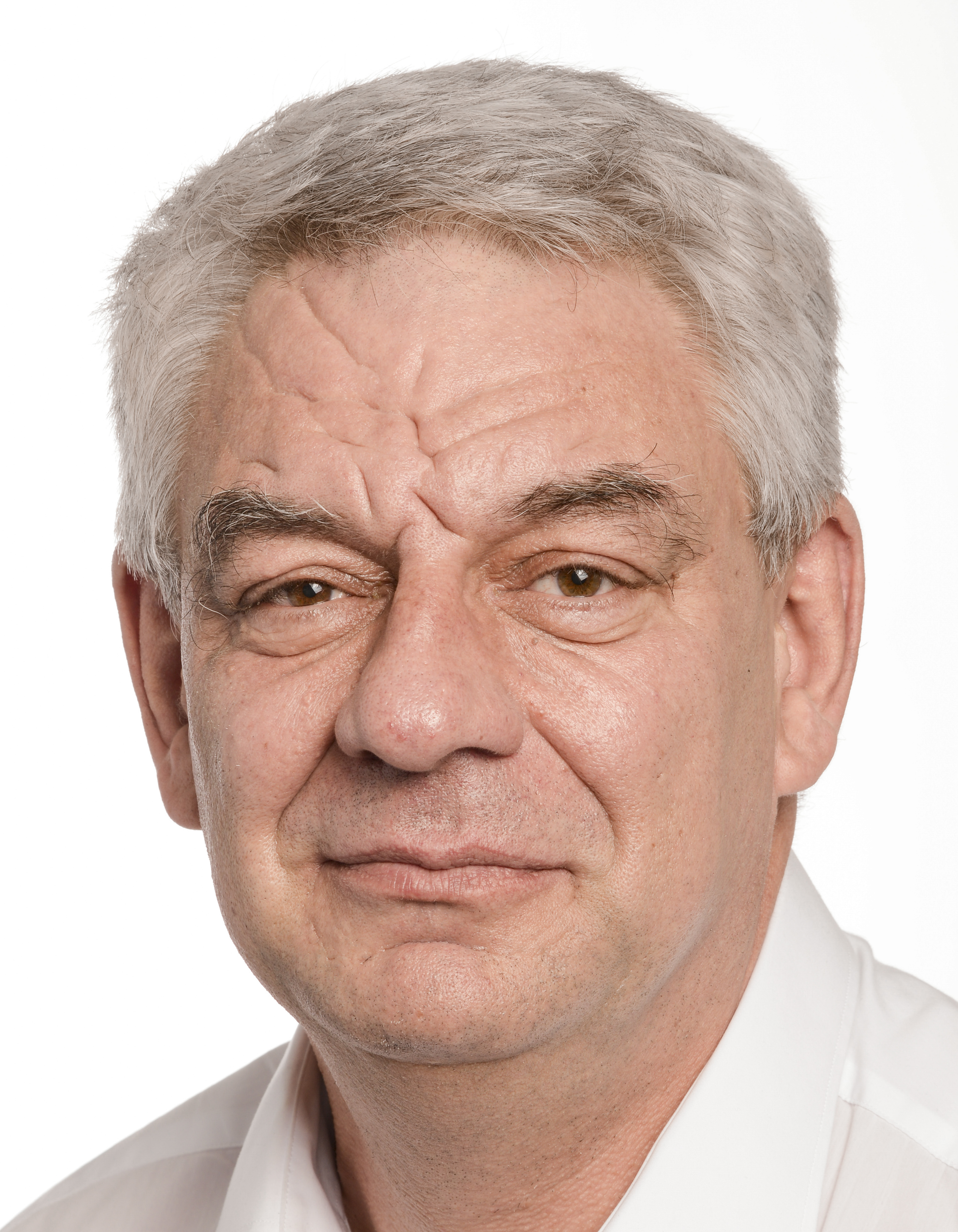
- Official portrait, 2024

66th Prime Minister of Romania
- In office 29 June 2017 – 16 January 2018
- President: Klaus Iohannis
- Deputy: Sevil Shhaideh; Paul Stănescu; Grațiela-Leocadia Gavrilescu; Marcel Ciolacu
- Preceded by: Sorin Grindeanu
- Succeeded by: Mihai Fifor (acting/ad interim)

Member of the European Parliament for Romania
- Incumbent
- Assumed office 2 July 2019

Minister of Economy
- In office 23 February 2017 – 29 June 2017
- Prime Minister: Sorin Grindeanu
- Preceded by: Alexandru Petrescu
- Succeeded by: Mihai Fifor
- In office 17 December 2014 – 17 November 2015
- Prime Minister: Victor Ponta
- Preceded by: Constantin Niță
- Succeeded by: Costin Grigore Borc

Personal details
- Born: 6 March 1967 (age 59) Brăila, Brăila County, Socialist Republic of Romania
- Party: FDSN (1992–93); PDSR (1993–2001); PSD (2001–2019); PRO Romania (2019–2020); PSD (2020–present)
- Spouse: Corina Tudose
- Children: 1
- Education: Dimitrie Cantemir Christian University

Mihai Tudose (Note: Romanian pronunciation: [miˈhaj tuˈdose]) (born 6 March 1967) is a Romanian politician, jurist and academic, deputy in the Parliament of Romania, a former Minister of Economy in 2017 and a former Prime Minister of Romania in 2018. On 16 January 2018 he resigned from his position as Prime Minister after his own Social Democratic Party (PSD) retracted its political support for his government. He subsequently switched from PSD to Victor Ponta's party PRO Romania in 2019.

On 6 January 2020, he resigned from PRO Romania and re-joined the Social Democratic Party (PSD).

== Political career ==
Mihai Tudose joined politics in 1992, as a member of the Democratic National Salvation Front (FDSN). Today, Tudose is member of the Social Democratic Party (PSD) and its national vice president since 2015. He entered the Parliament in 2000 and was elected consecutively for five terms as deputy in Brăila County. Mihai Tudose was Minister of Economy twice, between 2014 and 2015 in Fourth Ponta Cabinet and between February and June 2017 in Grindeanu Cabinet.

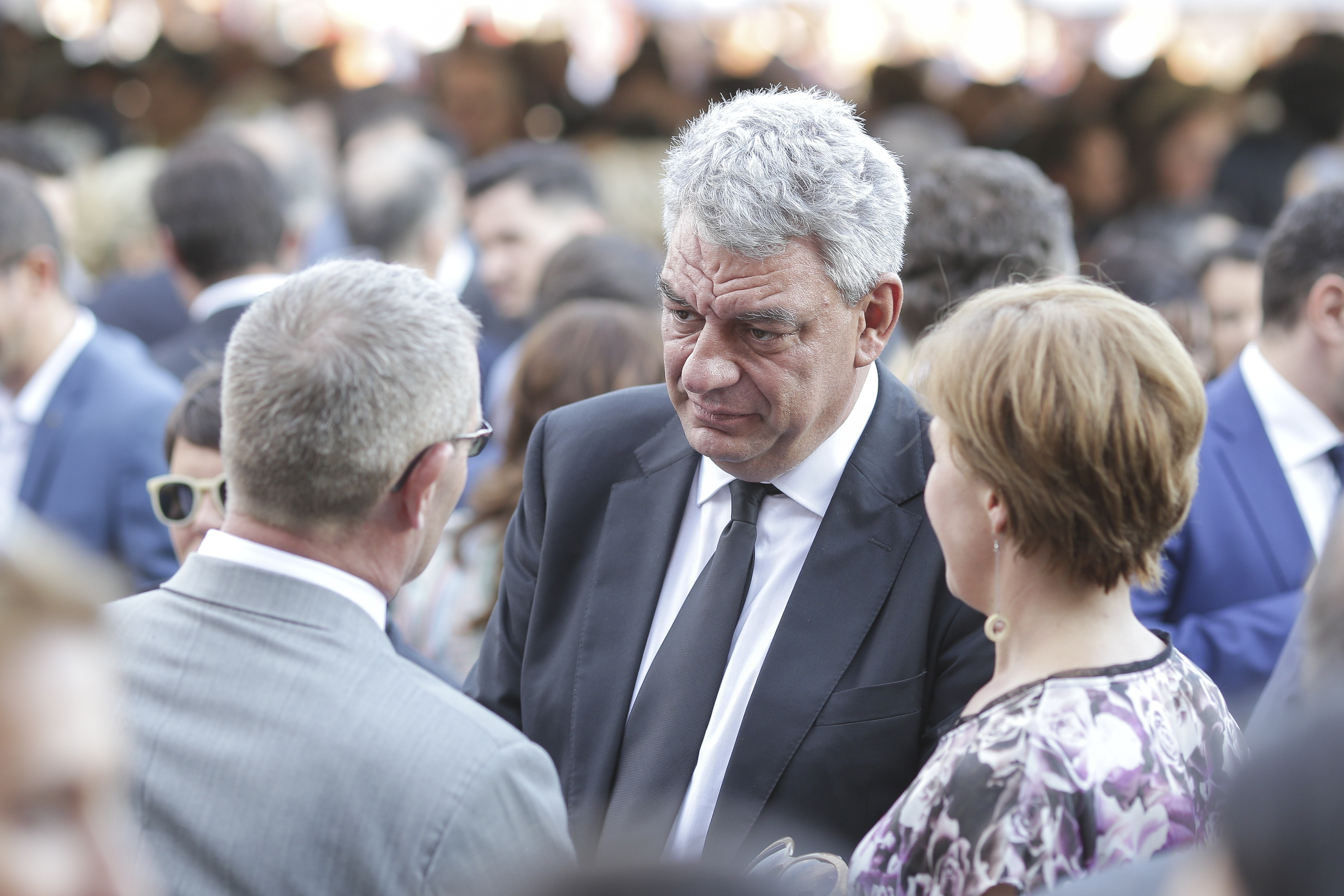
Mihai Tudose in 2017

He was one of the potential candidates for Prime Minister brought forward by the majority coalition led by the Social Democratic Party (PSD) to succeed Sorin Grindeanu after the latter was dismissed by a motion of no confidence adopted in Parliament by his own party. On 26 June 2017, the majority coalition nominated him for the position and President Iohannis designated him. He took office with his cabinet on 29 June.

== Controversy ==
As a holder of a doctorate in Military Sciences and Information, Tudose was involved in a plagiarism scandal after media reports had alleged that he might have plagiarized some parts of his doctoral work. In the aftermath of the scandal, he relinquished the use of his scientific title.

Commenting on the Székely autonomy initiatives and the use of their flag in public offices on 11 January 2018, Tudose said "If they fly Székely flags on institutions in Székely Land, the people who put the flags out will also hang next to the flags. Autonomy for Székelys is excluded." Acting president of the Democratic Alliance of Hungarians in Romania (UDMR) Bálint Porcsalmi said that Tudose's statement was inadmissible, calling it "primitive" and "reminiscent of the Middle Ages". Seven days later, Tudose was forced to resign from his position, partly due to the comments and infighting and lack of confidence via his party.

In June 2023, a MEP assistant accused Tudose of sexually harassing her. Tudose denied any accusation.

== See also ==
- Tudose Cabinet

== Notes ==
Political offices
Preceded by Constantin Niță	Minister of Economy; 2014–2015	Succeeded by Costin Grigore Borc
Preceded by Alexandru Petrescu	Minister of Economy; 2017	Succeeded by Mihai Fifor
Preceded by Sorin Grindeanu	Prime Minister of Romania; 2017–2018	Succeeded by Mihai Fifor; Acting
