= Raed Arafat =

Syrian-born Romanian intensive care physician

- رائد عرفات
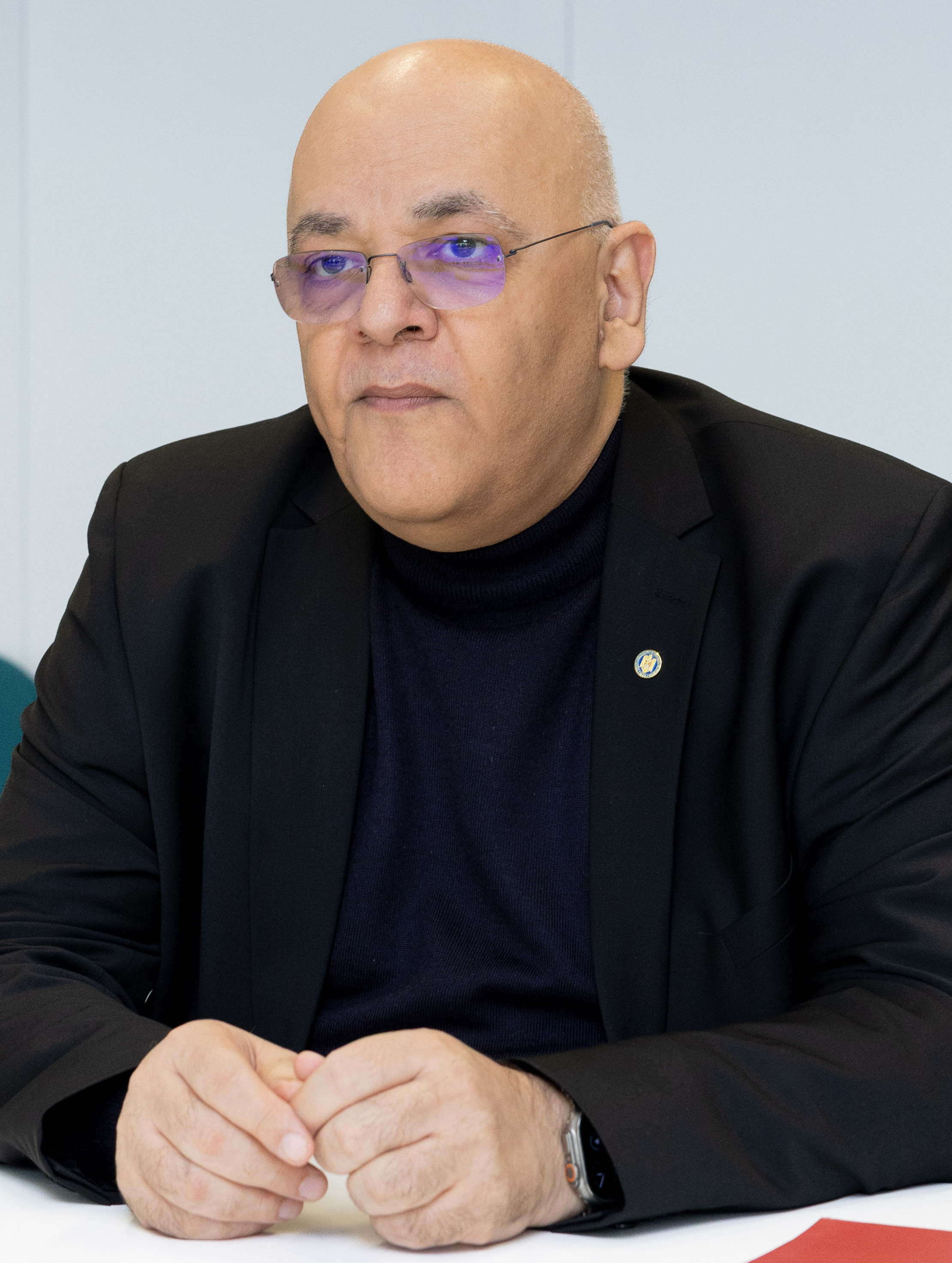
- Raed Arafat in 2025

Minister of Health
- (Acting)
- In office 7 November 2012 – 21 December 2012
- Prime Minister: Victor Ponta
- Preceded by: Victor Ponta (interim)
- Succeeded by: Eugen Nicolăescu

State secretary at the Ministry of Internal Affairs
- Incumbent
- Assumed office 29 January 2014
- Prime Minister: Victor Ponta; Dacian Cioloș; Sorin Grindeanu; Mihai Tudose; Viorica Dăncilă; Ludovic Orban; Florin Cîțu; Nicolae Ciucă; Marcel Ciolacu
- Minister: Gabriel Oprea; Petre Tobă; Dragoș Tudorache; Carmen Dan; Marcel Vela; Lucian Bode

State secretary at the Ministry of Health
- In office 21 December 2012 – 29 January 2014
- Prime Minister: Victor Ponta
- Minister: Eugen Nicolăescu; Nicolae Bănicioiu

State Under Secretary at the Ministry of Health
- In office August 2007 – October 2012
- Prime Minister: Călin Popescu-Tăriceanu; Emil Boc; Mihai Răzvan Ungureanu; Victor Ponta
- Minister: Eugen Nicolăescu; Ionuț Bazac; Adriean Videanu (interim); Attila Cseke; Ladislau Ritli; Vasile Cepoi; Victor Ponta (interim)

Personal details
- Born: May 27, 1964 (age 62) Damascus, Syria
- Citizenship: Romanian
- Party: Independent
- Education: UMF Cluj-Napoca; UMF Târgu Mureș
- Occupation: Medic, Politician
- Profession: Physician
- Cabinet: First Ponta cabinet
- Awards: National Order of Merit of Romania, Grand Officer rank
- Religion: Sunni Islam

Raed Arafat (Arabic: رائد عرفات; Romanian pronunciation: [raˈed araˈfat], first name also spelled Rayed; born May 24, 1964) is a Syrian-born Romanian intensive care physician of Palestinian origin, specialised in anesthesiology.

He founded the Mobile Emergency Service for Resuscitation and Extrication (SMURD) with the help from the Romanian Fire Fighting Brigade represented by Lt.-Col Mircea Pintilie. He was also the coordinator of Mureș County Emergency Services until 2007, when he was invited to take the position of Undersecretary of State at the Ministry of Health to deal with the development of emergency medical care in Romania.

He was also, for a short period, the Minister of Health (7 November — 21 December 2012), serving many years as Under-Secretary of State for Health in the Romanian Government. He accepted the position of Minister of Health just as a temporary position after which he was nominated as State Secretary at the Ministry of Health.

In 2014 he accepted the position of Secretary of State at the Ministry of Internal Affairs to head the newly created Department for Emergency Situations under which all emergency services are coordinated including fire and rescue, civil protection, prehospital medical emergency response, air rescue and emergency departments. He is still serving at the Ministry of Internal Affairs in this position.

== Early life ==
Arafat was born in Damascus to a Palestinian couple from Nablus. He worked as a volunteer in emergency medicine from the age of 14. In 1981 he emigrated to Romania and initially settled in Pitești, where he took Romanian language classes.

== Education ==
Arafat enrolled at the University of Medicine and Pharmacy in Cluj-Napoca. He later moved to the Târgu Mureș University of Medicine, where he underwent specialization in anesthesiology. He completed a number of specialist courses abroad, training with the Paris Fire Brigade, the United States National Guard, and the Norwegian Air Ambulance.

== Career ==
Following the 1989 Revolution, Arafat contemplated leaving for France, but his application was rejected, so he concentrated instead on creating an emergency service in Târgu Mureș (which he originally financed with personal funds).

In 1991, he created SMURD, a mobile emergency service which began collaborating with the Romanian firefighting service and the Fire service of Scotland, working for it as a volunteer until 1998, when he gained Romanian citizenship.

== Politics ==
In late 2005, his project to have SMURD function as an additional rescue service at a county level was passed into law, but raised opposition from the physician and Social Democratic politician Sorin Oprescu, who had drafted an alternative proposal. A reference to Arafat as "the Ayatollah of Romanian emergency medicine" and the stress he placed on the latter's country of origin brought Oprescu to the attention of the National Council for Combating Discrimination. A first aid instructor, he coordinated international lectures on the matter in several countries (including Austria, Denmark, Greece, the Netherlands, New Zealand, Ireland, the United Kingdom, and the United States). In 2003, he was made a Knight of the National Order of Merit of Romania (a Grand Officer since 2005).

Since August, 2009, he has held the position of Under-Secretary of State for Health. He resigned from this position on January 10, 2012, as he expressed criticism on the health system reform. After a series of protests in several cities, the government announced changes to the reform plan, and Dr Arafat returned to his post as Under-Secretary of State. In late 2012 he was Romanian Minister of Health, then came back to his charge as undersecretary in the same ministry.

== References and bibliography ==
- (in Romanian) A. Todea, F. Maria, M. Avram, Oameni de știință mureșeni – Dicționar biobibliografic, CJ Mureș Biblioteca Județeană Mureș, tipografia Mediaprint SRL, 2004
