= Raluca Prună =

Romanian politician and lawyer (born 1969)

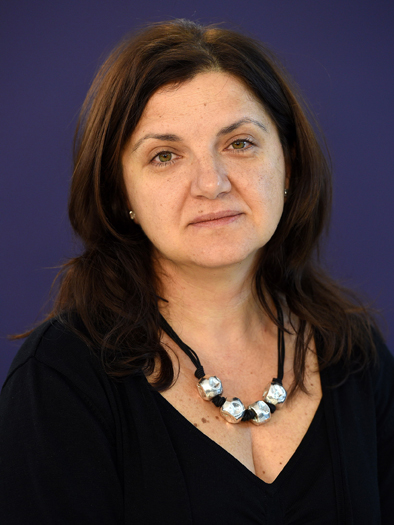
- Official portrait, 2015

Minister of Justice
- In office 17 November 2015 – 4 January 2017
- President: Klaus Iohannis
- Prime Minister: Dacian Cioloș
- Preceded by: Robert Cazanciuc
- Succeeded by: Florin Iordache

Personal details
- Born: August 24, 1969 Bucharest, Socialist Republic of Romania
- Education: University of Bucharest
- Occupation: Lawyer

Raluca Alexandra Prună (born 24 September 1969) is a Romanian politician and lawyer. She served as Minister of Justice in the Cioloș Cabinet from 17 November 2015 to 4 January 2017.

== Early life ==
Raluca Alexandra Prună was born on 24 September 1969 in Bucharest. She has a brother named Mihai Prună, who is a prosecutor that worked in the Prosecutors' Section of the SCM. From 1990 to 1994 she studied in the non-accredited Faculty of Law of the Ecological University of Bucharest. In February 1996 she obtained her license in Iași, as she had to wait for the accredation of the Ecological University, and then she graduated from Alexandru Ioan Cuza University. Between 1992 and 1997 she also attended the Faculty of Philosophy at the University of Bucharest.

In November 1996, she was admitted as a lawyer to the Bucharest Bar. Immediately after graduating from both institutions, she went on a TEMPUS scholarship to Paris Nanterre University before getting her master's. From 1997 to 1998, after her time in Paris, she did her master's degree in political science at the Central European University at their Budapest campus. She then graduated in an interrupted stint as a Doctor of Law from the University of Bucharest in July 2003. However, her doctoral thesis was later established to be plagiarized.

== Career ==
From 1990 to 1998, while studying, she obtained multiple scholarships from the Open Society Institute, USAID, and Institute for Humane Studies. She also worked as a lawyer and legal consultant from September 1996 to September 2000. In 1999, she became a founding member and the director of the Romanian association of Transparency International. In 2009 she was investigated by prosecutors of the Prosecutor's Office of the Court for forgery in statements during her presidency of Transparency International Romania for making false statements to obtain for Victor Alistar, the executive director, a notice for the extension of the suspension of the service relationship. The Prosecutor's Office declined competency to settle the case, but in 2010, the Bucharest Court of Appeal ordered the continuation of investigations, and the case was settled against Raluca as they found no intention of her making false statements.

From September 2000 to December 2004, she was an advisor for the Delegation of the European Commission in Bucharest in law, and was afterwards a lawyer-linguist at the legal service of the Council of the European Union from January 2005 to May 2007. From 2007 until her appointment as minister, she was Programme Coordinator for Justice and International Affairs at the European Commission Delegation in Bucharest.

=== Minister of Justice ===
Cristina Guseth was initially proposed as Minister of Justice, but the prime minister Dacian Cioloș withdrew her consideration after he thought that her performance was below expectations during questioning by the committees of the Romanian Parliament. It was then circulated that Mihai Selegean was the second choice, but ultimately Prună was chosen to appear before parliament and she was confirmed as Minister of Justice on 17 November 2015.

One of her first proposals was lifting the Mechanism for Cooperation and Verification that Romania signed to when joining the European Commission that monitored and supported judicial and anti-corruption reforms, as she said that the country needed to internalize the procedures without oversight. She also announced she wanted to move Judicial Police to the Prosecutors' Office, and that it was needed to carry out investigations.

Her main activities during 2016 were the appointment the Head of the DNA and Prosecutor General. Laura Codruta Kovesi was chosen again as Head of the DNA for a three-year term and Augustin Lazăr was chosen as Prosecutor General. She also regulated the practice of prisoners who wrote "scientific works" receiving sentence reductions, which she considered a loophole for corrupt politicians. and In 2016, she was again accused of making false statements by the opposition regarding Romania's commitment to the European Court of Human Rights with prison conditions. She resigned from the government on 4 January 2017, and was succeeded by Florin Iordache.

=== Post-ministerial role ===
Since 2018 she has headed the Financial Crime Unit of the European Commission's Directorate-General for Justice and Consumers, consequently of the Directorate-General for Financial Stability, Financial Services and Capital Markets Union.
