= Dan Stoenescu =

Romanian career diplomat, ambassador and political scientist

Minister – Delegate for Relations with Romanians Abroad
- In office 17 November 2015 – 7 July 2016
- President: Klaus Iohannis
- Prime Minister: Dacian Cioloș
- Preceded by: Angel Tîlvăr

Personal details
- Born: 4 November 1980 (age 45) Constanța, Romania
- Party: Independent
- Education: Austin College; University of Warwick; American University in Cairo; University of Bucharest

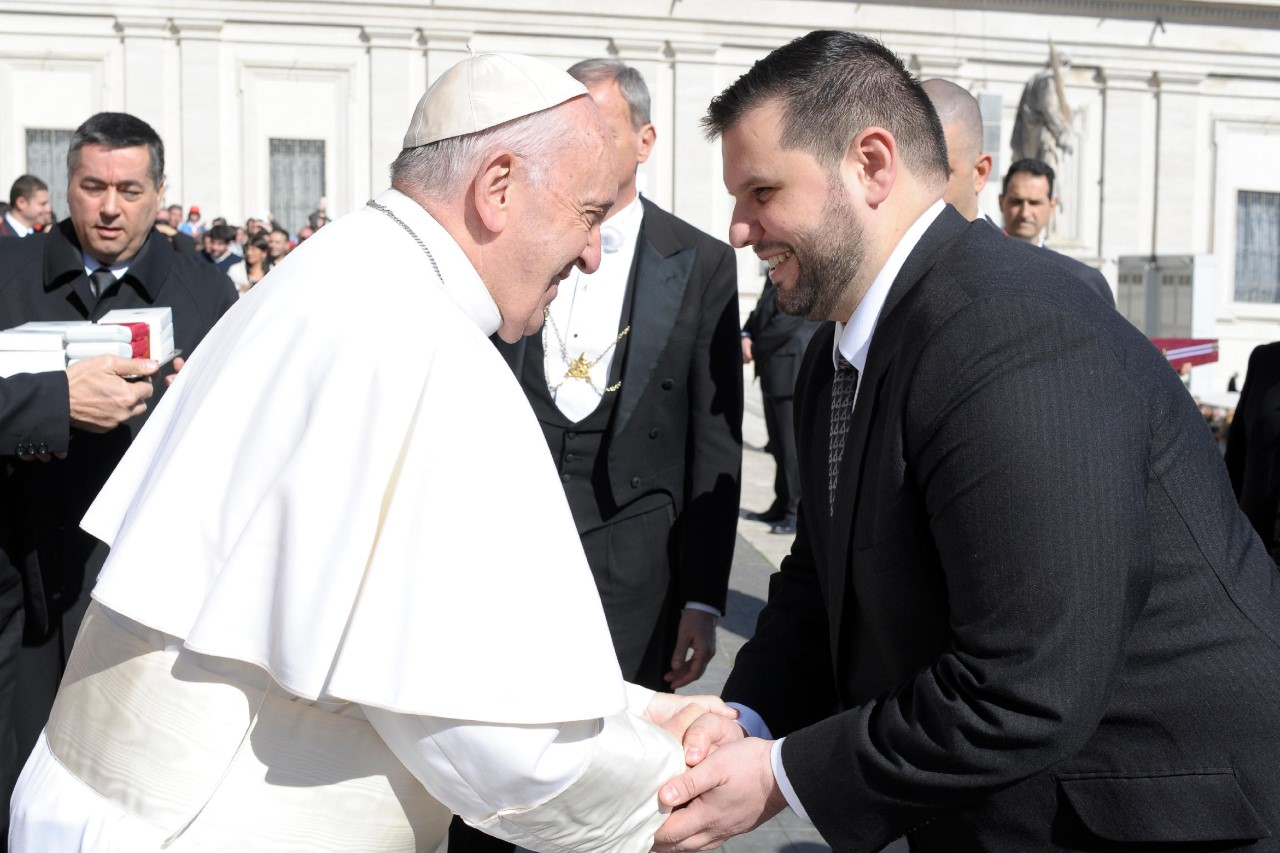
Stoenescu meeting Pope Francis

Dan Stoenescu (born 4 November 1980) is a Romanian career diplomat, political scientist and ambassador. He was a minister in the technocratic government of Prime Minister Dacian Cioloș. He is a specialist in international relations, the Arab World and migration. He is interested in the protection of the rights of the Romanian diaspora and in the preservation of the language and culture of ethnic Romanians abroad.

Stoenescu is fluent in Spanish, French, Italian, English, Portuguese, Romanian, and has notions of Arabic and Urdu.

== Education ==
He received a bachelor's degree in international studies from Austin College, in Sherman, Texas, in 2003, a master of arts degree in globalization and development from Warwick University in Great Britain in 2005, a graduate diploma in forced migration and refugee studies from the American University in Cairo in 2006, and a PhD in political science from the University of Bucharest in 2009, where he wrote his dissertation on modern Arab nationalism and Islamic identity after 1987. He followed specializations at the European Security and Defence College in Brussels, Netherlands Institute of International Relations Clingendael in the Hague, Matías Romero Institute in Mexico City and Saifi Institute for Arabic Language in Beirut.

== Career ==
Stoenescu entered the Romanian foreign service in 2007. He was Minister-delegate for Romanians abroad from 17 November 2015 to 7 July 2016, in the government of technocrats, led by Prime Minister Dacian Ciolos. Previously, he had diplomatic postings in Madrid and Beirut and was president of EUNIC (European Union National Institutes for Culture) in Lebanon for two consecutive mandate as a representative of the Romanian Cultural Institute. Between 2009–10 he worked in the Department on Policies for the Relationship with Romanians Abroad.

Starting in September 2015 he was responsible for the Romanian schools in Spain as First Secretary at the Romanian Embassy in Spain.

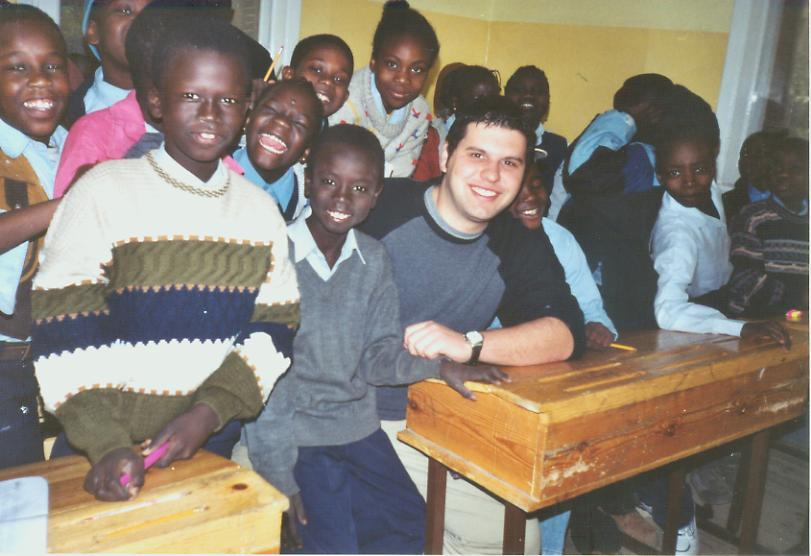
Dan Stoenescu volunteering with Sudanese refugees at the African Hope School in Cairo, Egypt (2002)

He previously lived in Egypt when he worked for the United Nations High Commissioner for Refugees (UNHCR) and the International Organization for Migration (IOM) offices in Cairo. Dan Stoenescu also worked as a journalist for various newspapers and magazines in Romania, United States, UK, Egypt, Lebanon, and the Republic of Moldova. He was involved in Egypt with non-governmental organizations such as African Hope, in the United States he volunteered for the Center for the Survivors of Torture as well as in Central America for El Salvador's Siglo XXIII.

Between 2005 and 2009 he was a lecturer in the political science department at the University of Bucharest, and thereafter at the Romanian Diplomatic Institute.

In 2000, he established the Worldwide Romanians Youth League (Liga Tinerilor Români de Pretutindeni) and later on the Center for Democratic Education Romania.

== Honors and awards ==
In 2017, Rotary International District 2241 Romania-Republic of Moldova awarded him the highest Rotary award, the Paul Harris Fellow Award, for his support to Romanians abroad and to the international projects of the Rotary Foundation. He also received in 2019 an award from the Macedo-Romanian Cultural Society for supporting the cause of Romanians in the Balkans on the occasion of the 140th anniversary from the founding of this society.

During his academic career, he was awarded many honors and distinctions such as the Rotary Ambassadorial Scholarship, Ford Foundation scholarship, First Phi Theta Kappa All-California Academic Team, Presbyterian Church USA Samuel Roberson award, and distinctions from California governor Gray Davis, assembly member Wilma Chan, and senator Don Perata.

== Ministerial term (2015–2016) ==
The mandate of the minister delegate brought many changes and innovations in terms of political and diplomatic measures and demarches in the relation of the Romanian government with the Romanian communities abroad. Amongst the first measures taken in the beginning of the mandate were transparency initiatives such as publication of the financed projects and the establishment of an online platform for projects.

At the beginning of his term, Stoenescu announced a new direction for Romanian institutions in offering new business and investment opportunities using European funds for Romanians of the diaspora who wish to return home. Therefore, the Ministry of European Funds and the Department Policies for the Relation with Romanians Abroad launched, in October 2016, a 30 million euro program called "Diaspora Start-up", as part of the Human Capital Operational Program (POCU) 2014–2020. The program offered a financing line for diaspora Romanians who returned recently and intend to open a business in an urban area in Romania. It is a program exclusively for developing entrepreneurship and establishing new businesses. Another innovative measure was the launching of the AgroDiaspora program meant to inform Romanians living abroad about the investment opportunities in the Romanian agriculture available through accessing European funds. In order to develop entrepreneurial skills within the Diaspora, a new online program called "Worldwide Romanian Entrepreneurs" was launched offering hundreds of free scholarships. To consolidate the cultural links between Romania and its kin ethnic groups in the near abroad, a series of demarches were started in order to establish Romanian Information Centers in Bălți (Republic of Moldova), Izmail (Ukraine) and Solotvyno (Ukraine). The Romanian Information Centers in Bălți and Izmail, established by minister Stoenescu, were inaugurated in December 2016. The center in Solotvyno (Slatina) was opened in 2018 and the one in Korcea was inaugurated in 2019.

Furthermore, a project called the Common Communication Space Romania – Republic of Moldova was initiated in order to support cooperation and convergence projects between press institutions, civil society and governmental institutions on a bilateral level. As part of this strategic project it was established the Romania – Republic of Moldova Mass media Consultative Council – a consultation forum for the civil society, management representatives of press institutions and journalists from both states to harmonize and integrate media laws and public policies in the area of mass media communication.

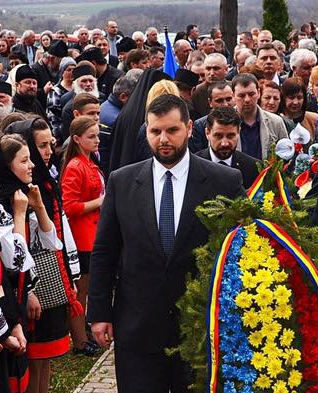
Minister delegate Dan Stoenescu commemorating the Fântâna Albă massacre, Northern Bukovina (Ukraine)

During his term, he promoted measures to combat what he views as the artificial division of Romanian communities between Romanians and Moldovans, Romanians and Timok Vlachs and Romanians and Aromanians.

For a stronger common inter-institutional demarche in support of Romanian communities, the minister delegate always brought along during his visits abroad representatives of the Presidential Administration, the Commissions for Romanians Abroad in the Romanian Chamber of Deputies and the Senate of Romania as well as of other ministries. The minister delegate was the first high-ranking official member of the Dacian Cioloș government to visit the Republic of Moldova In early March 2016, Stoenescu went on a diplomatic mission to Malaysia as special envoy of President Klaus Iohannis and Prime Minister Dacian Cioloș to appeal to the Malaysian authorities to pardon and commute the death sentence for the Romanian inmate Ionut Gologan.

Prior to the 2016 Parliamentary elections, he launched together with the Electoral Permanent Authority a widespread campaign to inform Romanians living abroad about the legislative changes regarding the new possibility of voting by mail and organizing new voting sections in ones area of residence.

Moreover, he initiated a legislative modification of Law no.321/2006 to ensure greater transparency on non-refundable financing for programs, projects and activities in support of Romanian communities living abroad.

The Romanian media recognized the innovations brought by his mandate: "unlike the politicians that had Stoenescu's portfolio, his work was an enormous leap forward"

== As ambassador in Tunis (2017–2021) ==
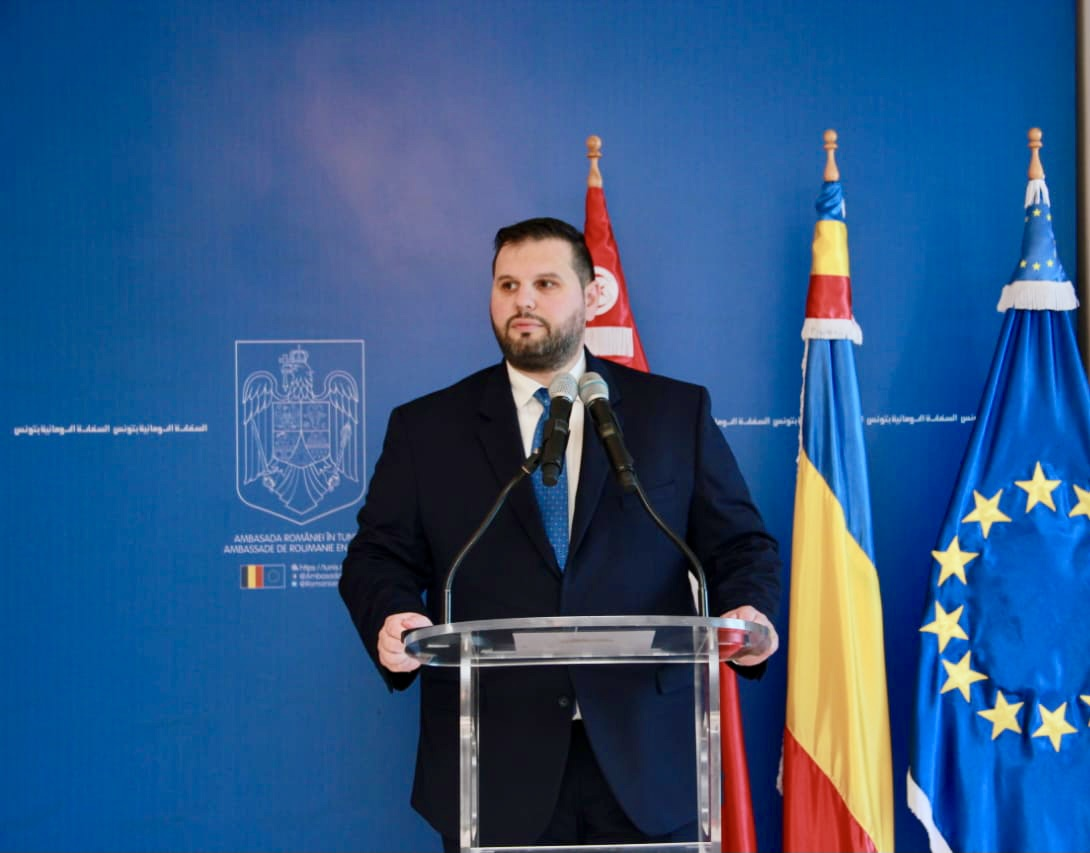
Dan Stoenescu

From March 2017 to May 22, 2021, he was Romania's ambassador to Tunisia. Since 1963, bilateral relations are governed by a legal framework comprising more than 50 agreements. Numerous agreements were negotiated and signed during his term, including an executive program in the field of health and medical sciences (2018); a cooperation agreement between the National Anticorruption Directorate (DNA) in Romania and the National Anticorruption Authority (INLUCC) in Tunisia; a cooperation agreement between Diplomatic institutes (2018); a cooperation agreement between UTICA (Tunisian Union of Industry, Trade and Handicrafts) and the Romanian Chamber of Commerce and Industry (2019); a Protocol of cooperation between the Government of Tunisia and the Government of Romania in the field of civil protection (2019); A Memorandum of Understanding was signed between the Independent High Authority for Elections of Tunisia and the Permanent Electoral Authority of Romania (2020).

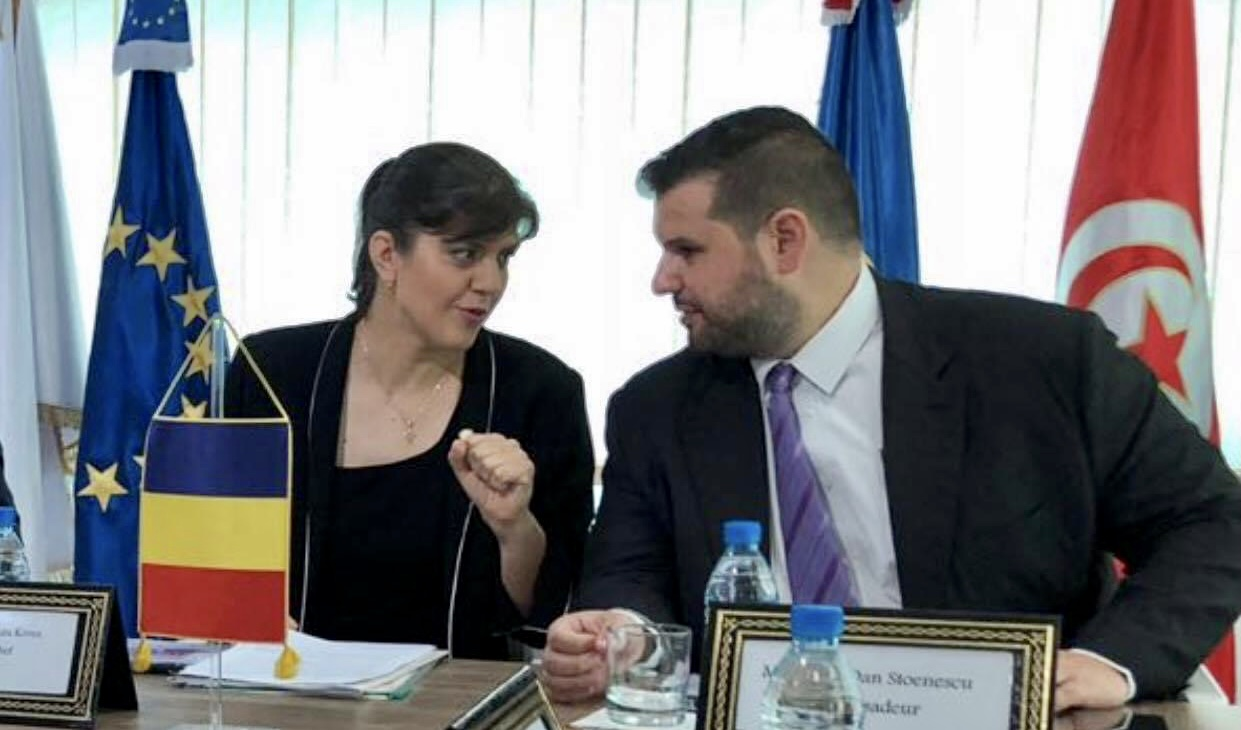
Ambassador Dan Stoenescu and DNA general prosecutor Laura Corduța Kövesi

At the institutional level, he also established a close bilateral cooperation between INLUCC and Romanian institutions such as the National Anticorruption Directorate (DNA), National Integrity Agency (ANI), and Crime Prevention Directorate of the Ministry of Justice.INLUCC. Also, during his term, a strong partnership was established between the National Civil Protection Office of Tunisia and the Department for Emergency Situations of Romania, between the courts of Auditors of the two countries, between national radio stations and there are also many other examples...

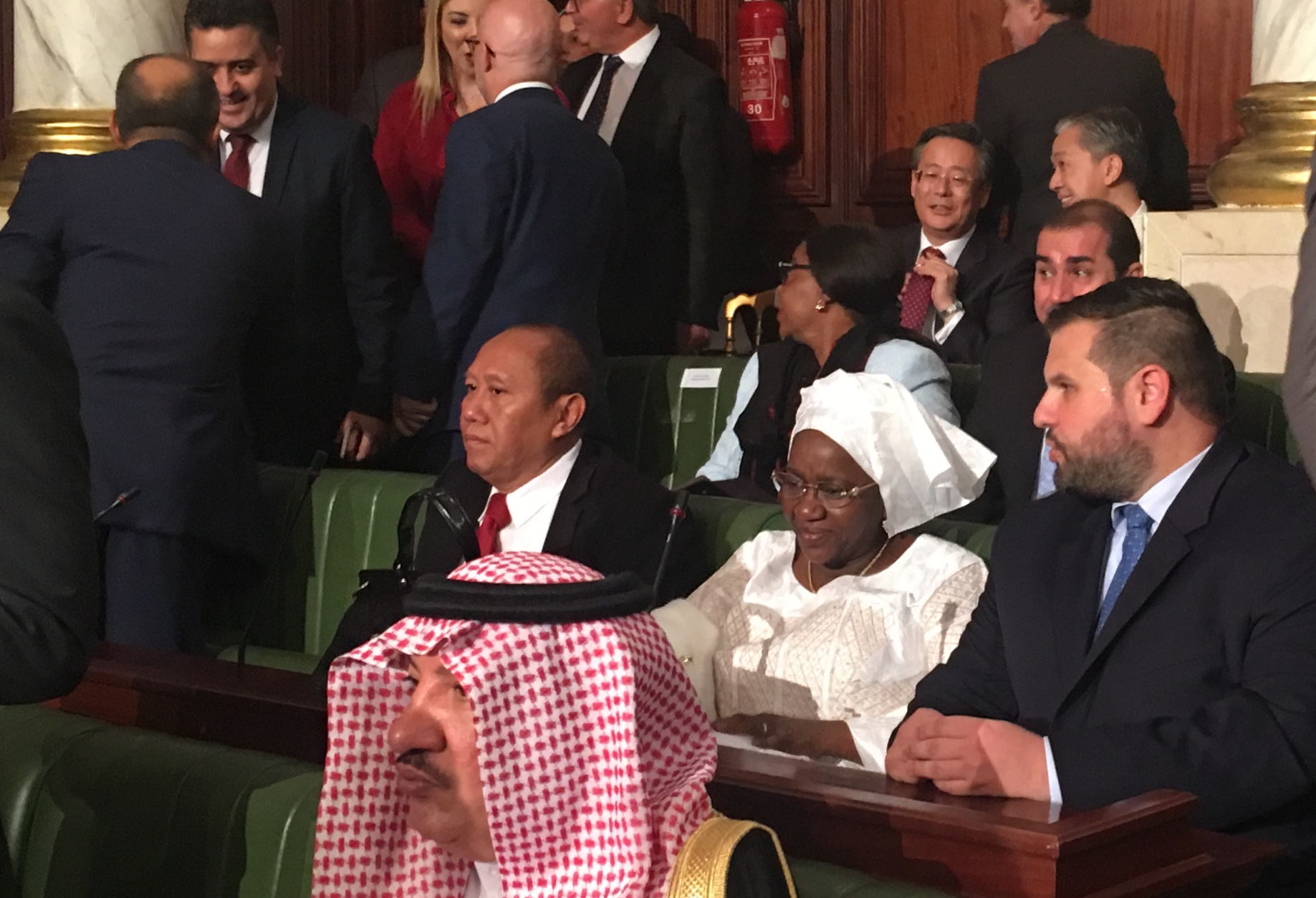
Dan Stoenescu at the Tunisian Assembly of the Representatives of the People

In the first half of 2019, under his direction, the activities organized by the Embassy of Romania in Tunis on the sidelines of the Presidency of the Council of the European Union included public and cultural diplomacy events, coordination meetings, political and diplomatic events and a debate on EU-Africa relations.

As a representative of the Romanian Presidency of the EU Council and the Commission for Territorial Cohesion Policy and EU Budget (COTER), he also participated in the 3rd round of EU-Tunisia high-level political dialogue on security and the fight against terrorism.

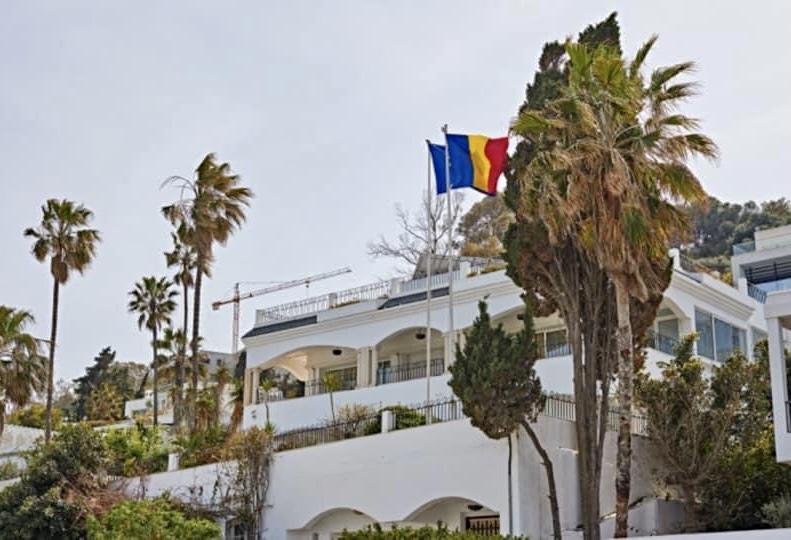
Embassy of Romania to the Republic of Tunisia, La Marsa

In 2019, he was part of the European Union Election Observation Mission in Tunisia (EU EOM) During his mandate, he also played an active role in the Group of Francophone Ambassadors in Tunisia (GAF) especially in the perspective of the 2021 Francophonie Summit in Djerba. During 2017–2021, numerous visits to Tunisia took place not only by Romanian officials but also by political, cultural, sports and academic personalities from Romania.

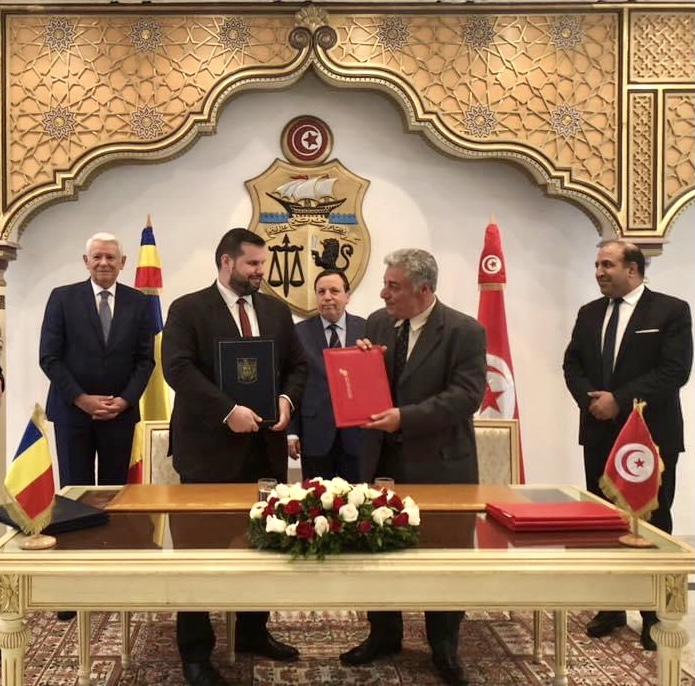
Dan Stoenescu signing an agreement during the official visit of FM Melescanu In Tunis

The Minister of Foreign Affairs, Teodor Meleșcanu, came to Tunis, between 19 and 20 April 2018; concurrently with the inauguration of the new headquarters of the Embassy of Romania.

Also, several delegations from the Romanian institutions and the Romanian Parliament carried out working visits to Tunisia.

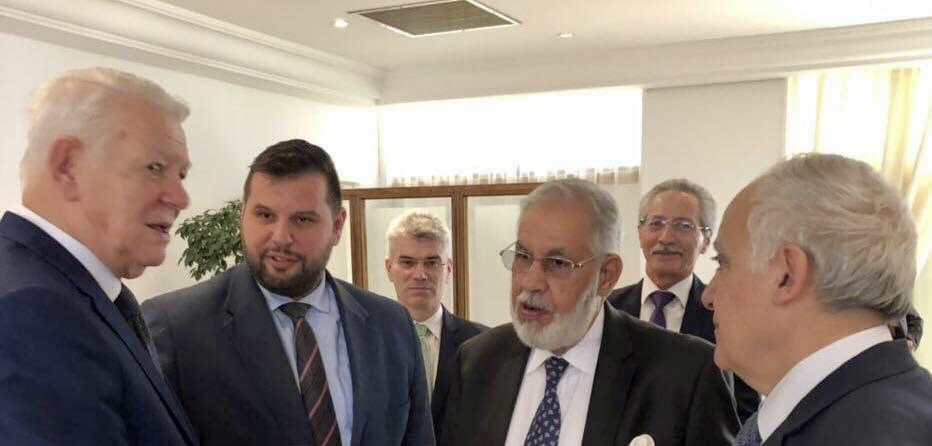
Ambassador Dan Stoenescu together with Romanian foreign minister Teodor Melescanu, Libyan Foreign Minister Mohamed Taher Siala and UN envoy for Libya Ghassan Salame

In the context of the Libyan civil war, he coordinated, on the Tunisian side, several repatriation operations of Romanian citizens from the war zone. In order to strengthen decentralized bilateral cooperation, he supported the development of cooperation between municipalities in Romania and Tunisia: Tunis-Timișoara, Tunis-Arad, Djerba Midoun-Bușteni, Petriș-Takrouna, Iași-Ariana. Despite the difficult economic situation, economic relations have become more dynamic under his mandate. Thus, Romania has become the 13th trading partner and the 11th supplier for Tunisia.

The main products exported are: cereals (32%), oil and oil derivates (25%), cars and electric appliances (13%), iron and steel, wood and wood products, inorganic chemicals boilers, motors and other mechanical appliances. Also, many other numerous meetings and economic events were organized to promote Romania together with the Chambers of Commerce and Industry of Tunis, Sfax, Sousse, Bizerte, Beja. Furthermore, the Embassy of Romania in Tunis and Romanian private companies have prepared the Romanian Stand at SIAMAP – International Exhibition of Agriculture, agricultural machinery and fisheries. During his mandate, the number of Romanian investments in Tunisia has increased: according to data provided by the Agency for the Promotion of Foreign Investments, there are 9 companies with a capital of 41,581 million dinars and 600 jobs were created. Six of these companies operate in the Textile/ Clothing Sector, one in the Pharmaceutical industry and the others in the building materials sector.

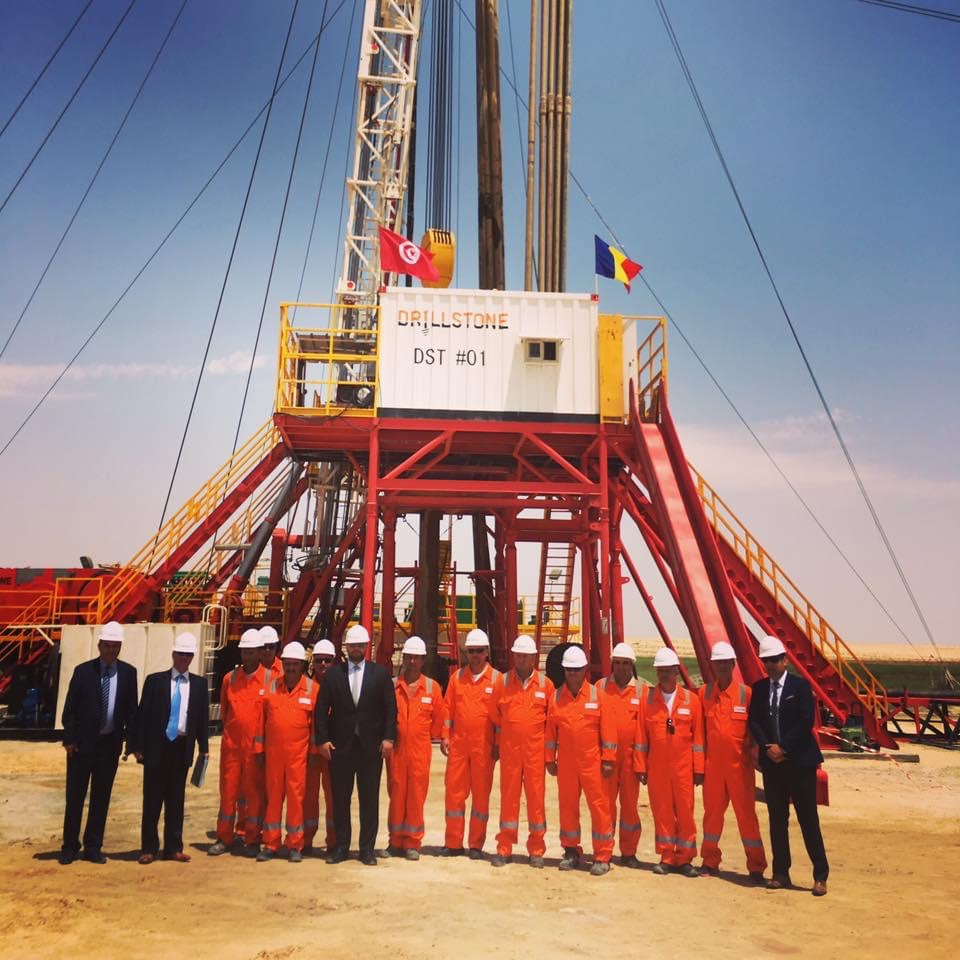
Inauguration of Oued Retem CI02 drilling site in Nefta

Another concrete example is the presence of Romanian companies on the Tunisian market and the inauguration in 2017 of water drilling works in Oued Retem CI02 site (17 km after Nafta, Tozeur governorate), in the south of Tunisia, a project developed by the Romanian company “Drillstone”. Tunisian investments in Romania also included 25 million Euros, invested in the “ORADEA” project in the car cable sector (Câbleries Chakira). When the pandemicCOVID-19 began, at the beginning of 2020, he coordinated the repatriation of Romanian citizens. In addition, and in order to support the Romanian citizens in the pandemic context, the Embassy of Romania in Tunis created a network and made available the contact details of some pharmacists, Romanian doctors and Tunisian doctors who speak Romanian. Culturally and academically, his mandate was marked by the establishment, for the first time, of new Romanian institutions in Tunisia such as the Center for Culture and Science of Romania in Tunisia (2018) and the Romanian Lectorate in the Bourguiba Institute for Modern Languages (2020).

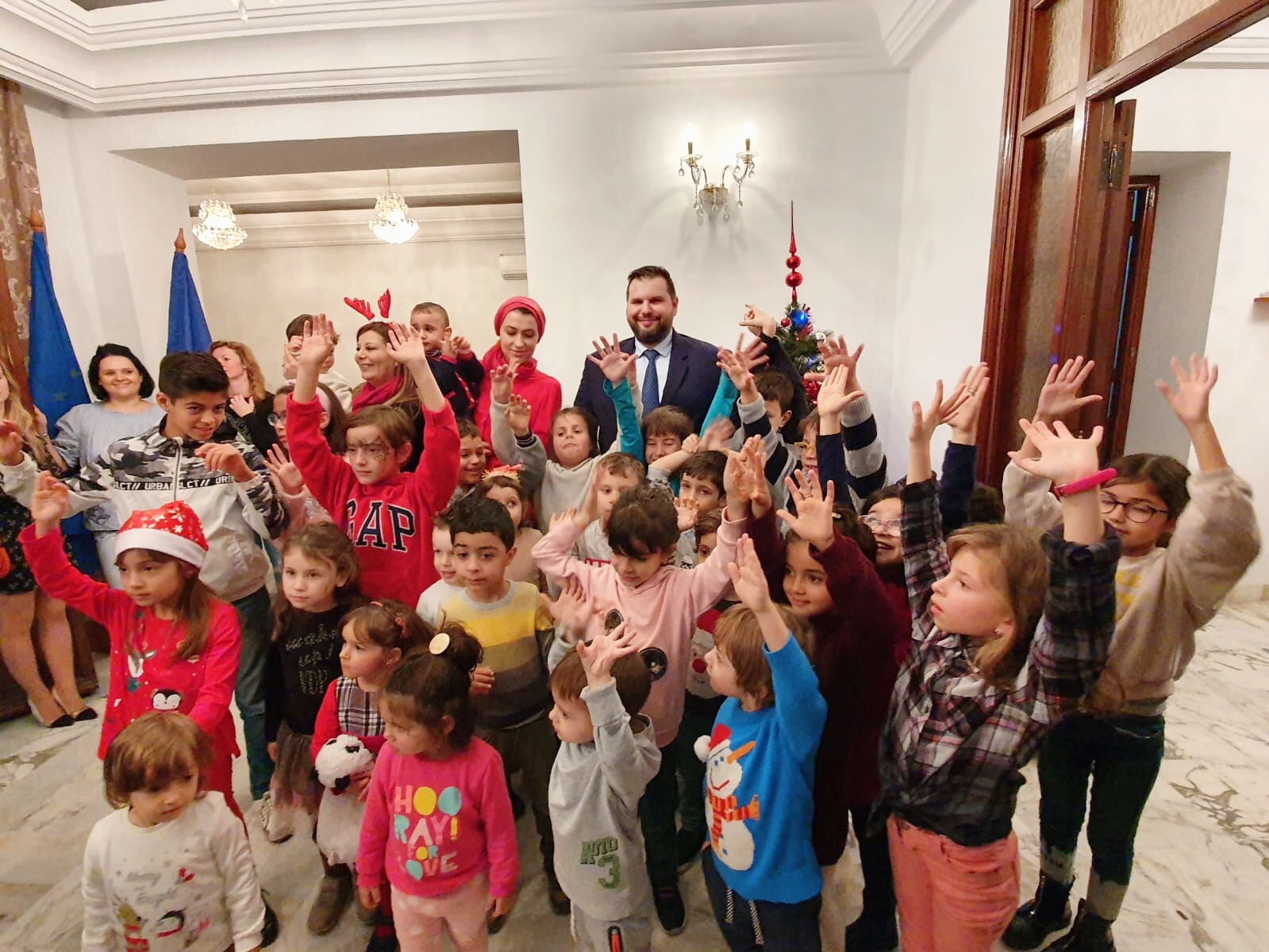
Ambassador Stoenescu with the Romanian community in Tunisia

Again on his initiative, Romanian Language courses for the children of the Romanian community in Tunisia were started at the Consular Section of the Diplomatic Mission. Furthermore, during his mandate and for the first time, was organized in 2018 “Campus Roumanie”. It was the biggest educational event in the history of Romanian-Tunisian bilateral relations. Representatives of 17 Romanian and 14 Tunisian universities were present at the University Forum. Concrete opportunities for cooperation were explored and more than 30 partnerships were concluded.

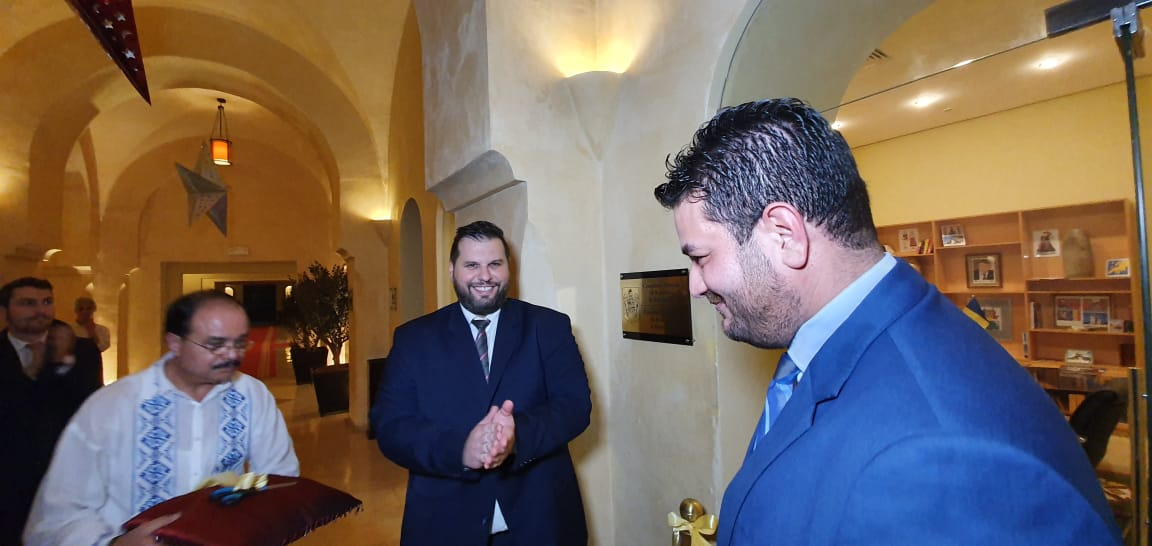
Ambassador Dan Stoenescu and Honorary Consul of Romania in Hammamet Tahar Zahar at the opening of the Honorary Consulate

In order to support the Romanian citizens in Tunisia and the tens of thousands of Romanian tourists who visit Tunisia each year, the Honorary Consulate of Romania was established in Hammamet (2019) covering the governorates of Nabeul and Sousse. According to estimates from the Tunisia Ministry of Tourism, more than 25,424 Romanians traveled to Tunisia between January and October 2019. He also supported the creation of the Association of Tunisian graduates in Romania (2018) and the Tunisian-Romanian Cultural Association (2020).

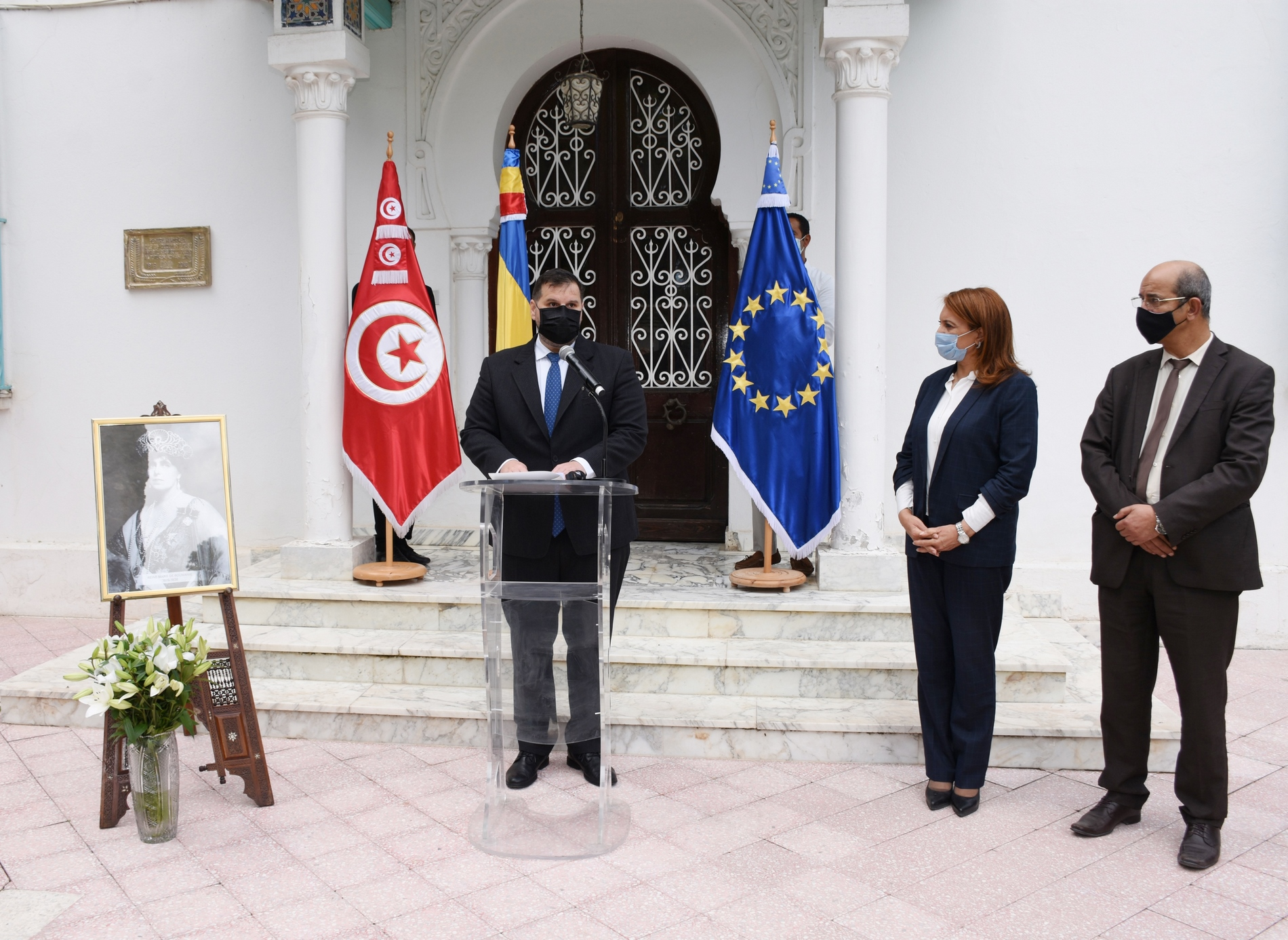
Inauguration Ceremony of Queen Marie of Romania Piazza In Tunis

At his initiative, the Mayor of Tunis, Souad Abderrahim, officially inaugurated the “Queen Marie of Romania Plaza“ located in “Cité Jardins“ district in front of the Consular Section of the Embassy of Romania in Tunis on 27 October 2020.

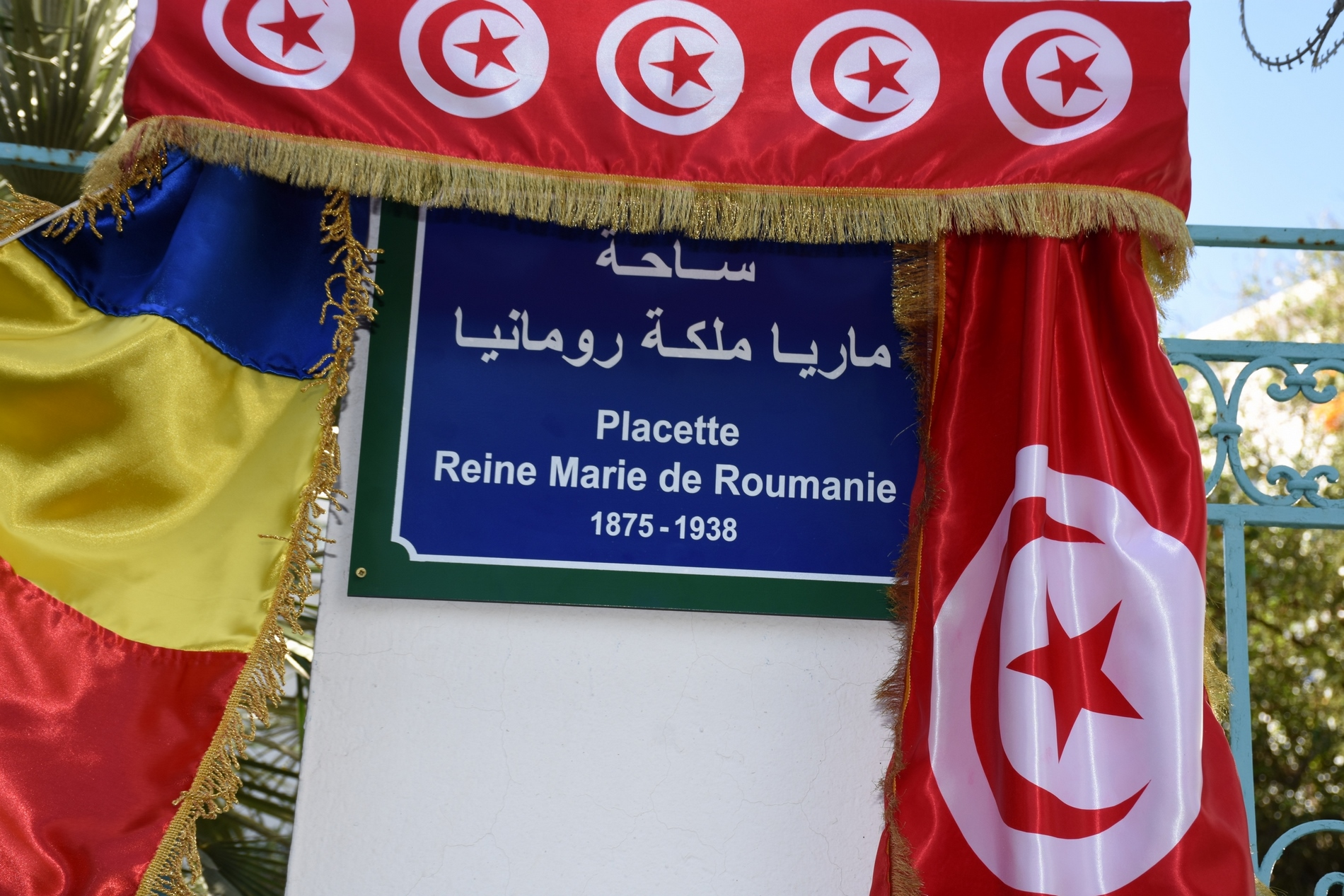
Placette Reine Marie de Roumanie street sign In Tunis

== As Chargé d’Affaires of the European Union to Syria (2021-2024) ==
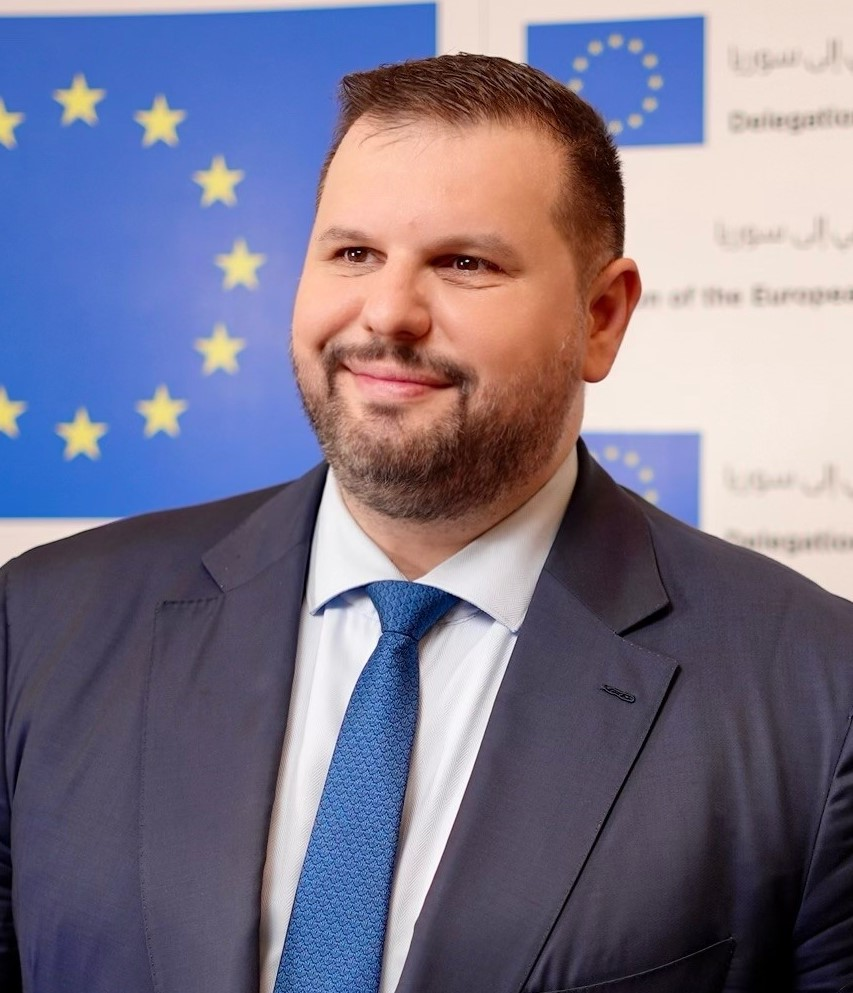
Dan Stoenescu, Head of the EU delegation to Syria (2021-2024)

On April 16, 2021, European Union foreign policy chief Josep Borrell announced his appointment as EU chargé d’affaires to Syria, effective September. Dan Stoenescu's tenure as Chargé d’Affaires of the European Union to Syria, beginning in September 2021, has been marked by several key achievements and initiatives. One of his main roles has been maintaining communication channels open with the Syrian authorities, despite the European Union's non-recognition of the Bashar al-Assad regime. This has been crucial for providing assistance to the Syrian people, who have been facing a severe humanitarian crisis amid conflict.

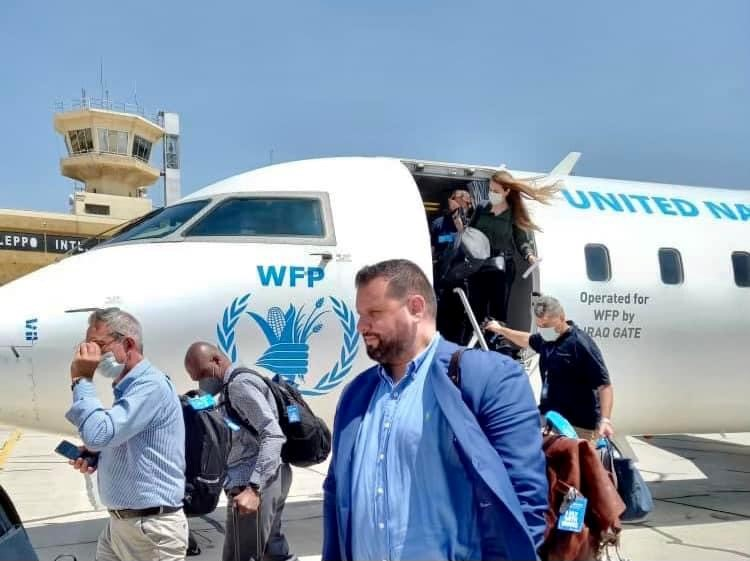
Dan Stoenescu stepping off a WFP UNHAS plane in Aleppo

Stoenescu has been actively involved in addressing the refugee situation, particularly in relation to Turkey, which hosts a significant number of Syrian refugees. He emphasizes the importance of dialogue with Turkey to find solutions for the refugees. He advocated for a political process according to United Nations Security Council Resolution 2254 and for involving all international stakeholders, including Damascus.

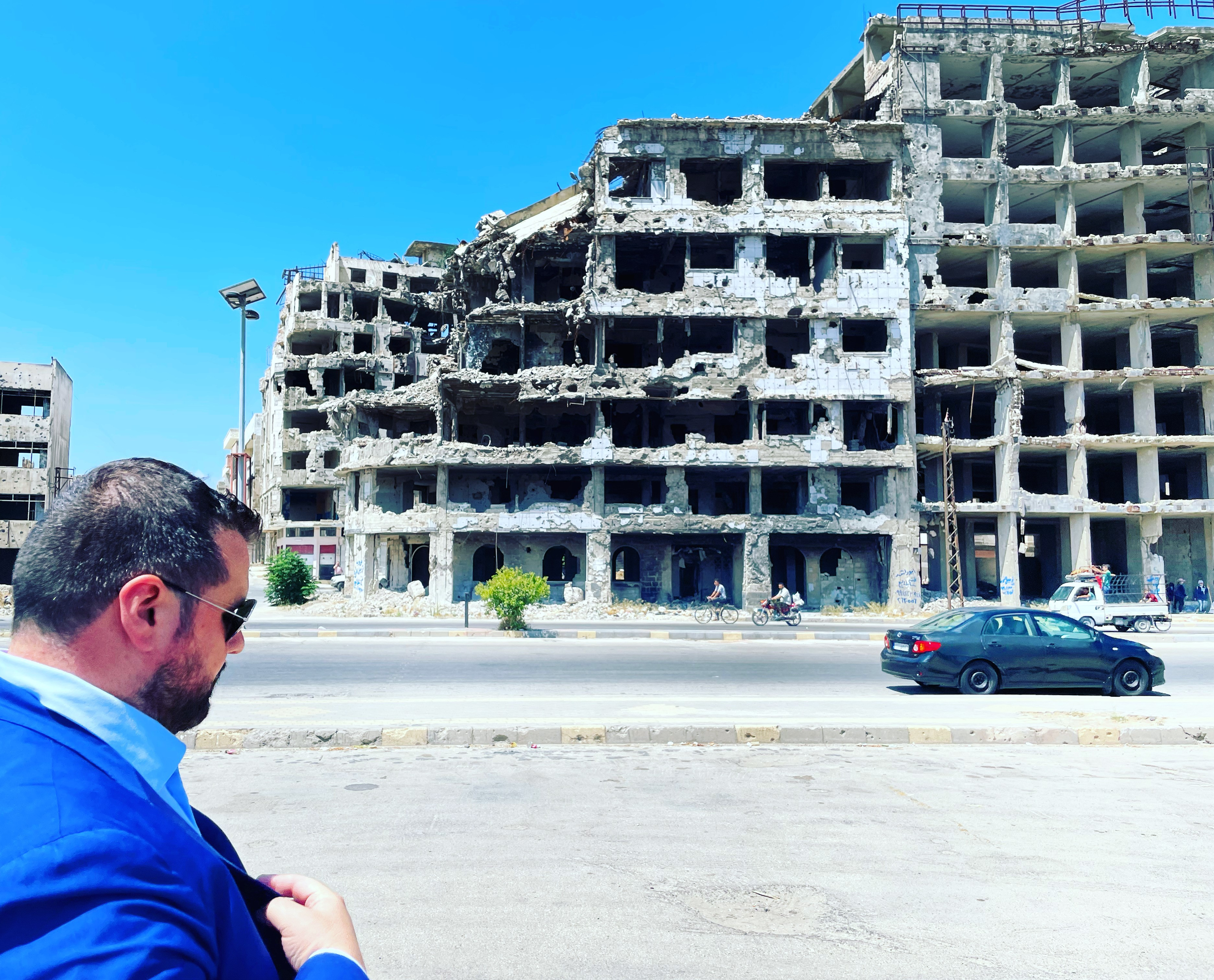
Dan Stoenescu in Homs

Additionally, he has focused on ensuring that European Union funding for projects in Syria is not misappropriated by the Assad regime or associated entities. This includes supporting projects through the United Nations and international non-governmental organizations, especially in areas controlled by different de-facto authorities in Syria. This approach aimed to provide direct assistance to the Syrian people while avoiding funding entities targeted by EU sanctions.

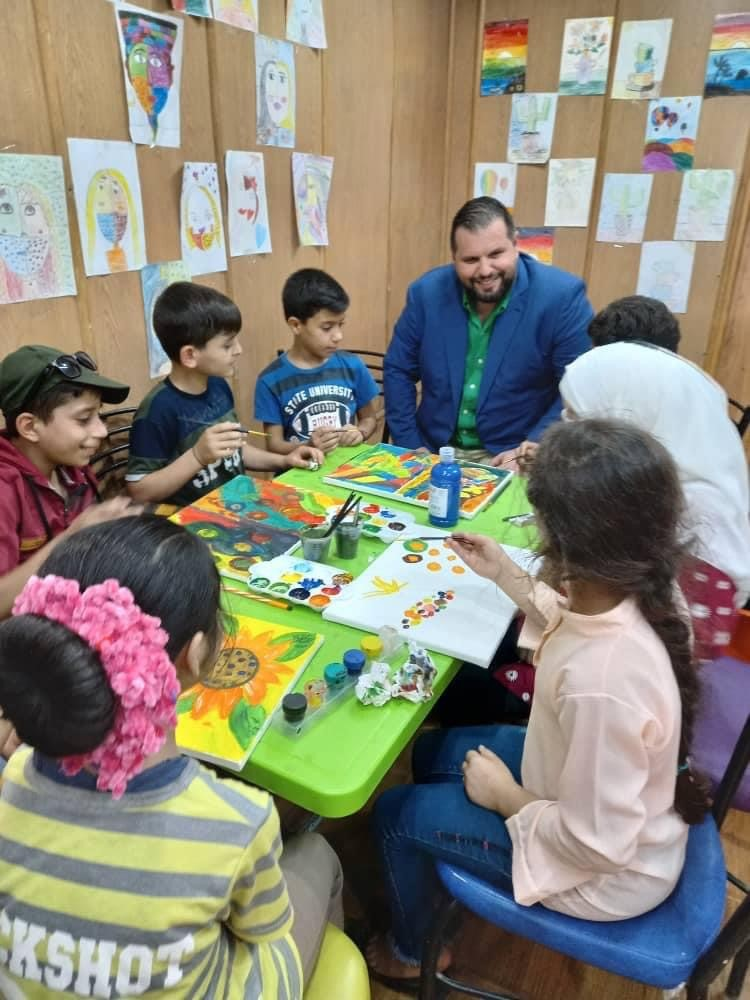
Dan Stoenescu visiting a kindergarten in Syria

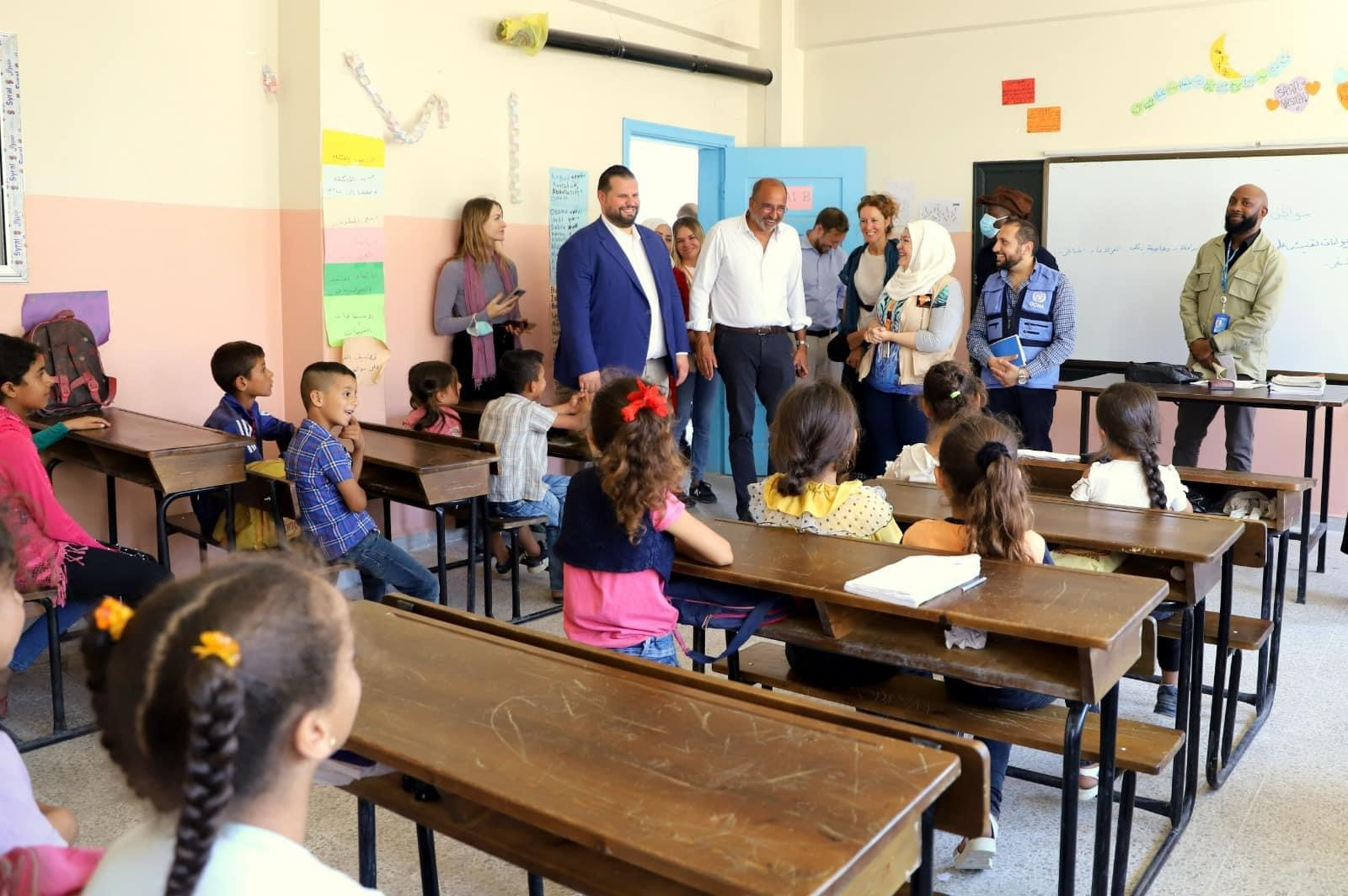
Dan Stoenescu and Imran Reza visiting a school in Syria

During his mandate he has also highlighted the interconnectedness of global events, particularly noting how the situation in Ukraine affected Syria, disrupting grain supplies and having a significant impact on food security within the country. Dan Stoenescu played a pivotal role in the region's COVID-19 response. His efforts were marked by strong advocacy for vaccination, acknowledging Syria's lower immunization rates compared to other regions. He spearheaded the coordination of vaccine roll-outs, particularly for vaccines donated by EU member states, in partnership with the World Health Organization (WHO). This included overseeing the funding for vaccination teams and public awareness initiatives. Aiming to meet ambitious vaccination targets, the EU sought to vaccinate 70% of Syria's population by mid-2022, a goal set amidst the backdrop of conflict, economic challenges, and harsh conditions. Stoenescu also facilitated collaborations with COVAX and various global partners to accelerate vaccine delivery to Syria, aiming to substantially increase the vaccination rate by year's end.

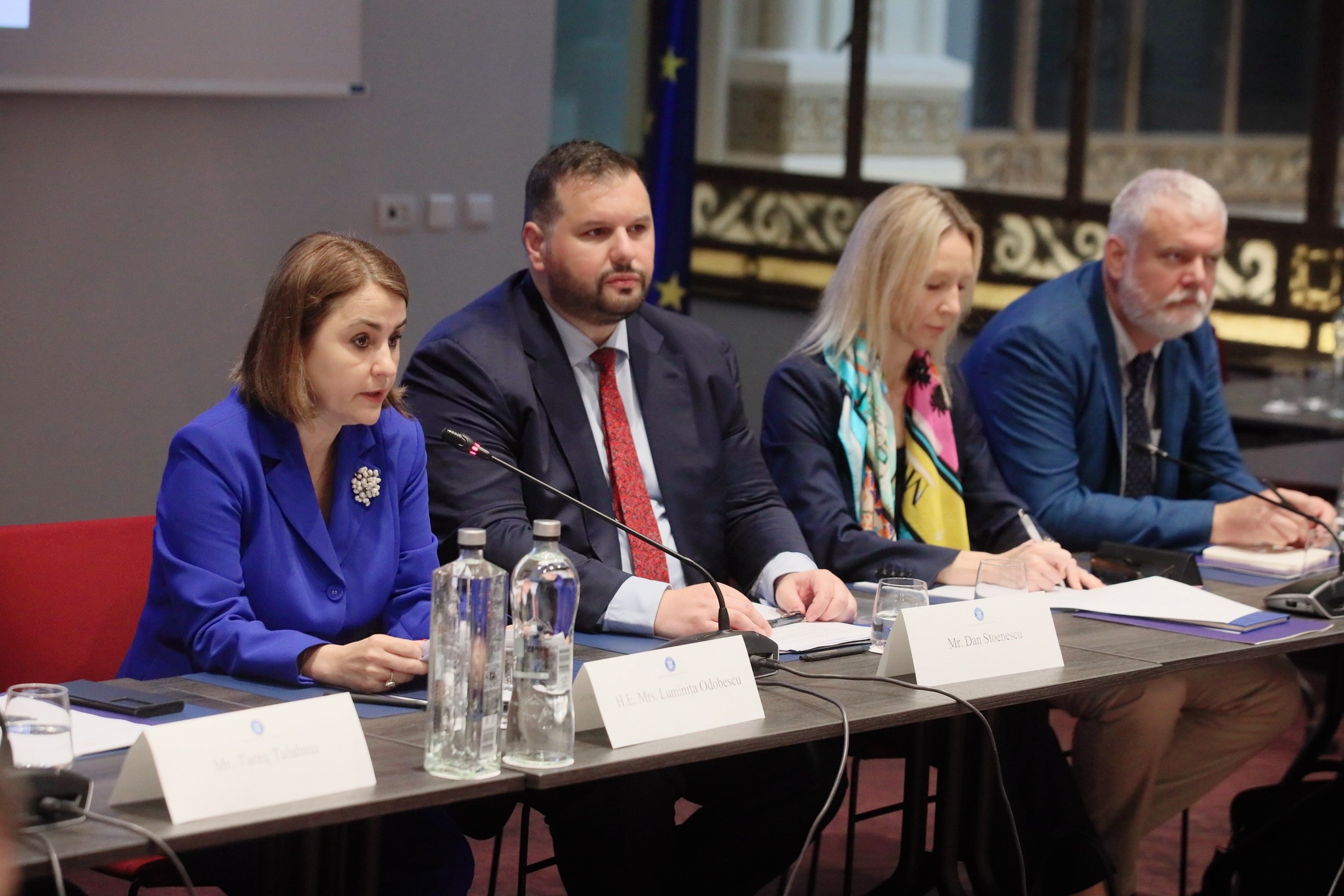
Luminita Odobescu and Dan Stoenescu in Bucharest at the EU Retreat on Syria (May 2024)

Dan Stoenescu was the first EU official that visited an area outside of Damascus since the beginning of the Syrian crisis. Together with the UN Resident and Humanitarian Coordinator (RC/HC) for Syria Imran Riza visited Aleppo, Hama and Homs Governorates to assess the humanitarian situation in the area. The EU-UN Delegation visited, over a four-day period, a number of projects in the three governorates, some of which are funded by the EU, one of the largest donors to the UN in Syria. The projects ranged from life-saving support being provided by humanitarian partners to longer-term interventions that address deeper structural issues that underlie the crisis in Syria. After this mission he was accused by the opposition of normalizing relations with the Assad regime in order to encourage the return of refugees. In response, Stoenescu stressed that the projects implemented by the European Union in Syria are not aimed at rehabilitating the regime but are humanitarian assistance such as repairing schools and streets and providing water. Moreover, he underlined that there will be no normalization with the regime or the lifting of sanctions unless there is an inclusive political process within the framework of the United Nations.

On 6 February 2023, a devastating 7.8 magnitude earthquake hit southern Türkiye and northern Syria. Stoenescu coordinated together with the EU humanitarian arm ECHO and the EU member states to provide and organize first relief aid to the people in need. The EU reacted fast and played an important role in providing the rapid relief to those affected. This included activation of the European Humanitarian Response Capacity providing the needed funds. EU stockpiles were mobilized to deliver emergency supplies to the whole of Syria. In addition, the EU Civil Protection Mechanism was activated and 15 EU Member States and 1 Participating State delivered relief items including blankets, field beds, tents, heaters, power generators, medical consumables and medical units etc. In the first week after the disaster, the EU and its member states have gathered more than 50 million euros to provide aid and back rescue missions and first aid in both government-held and rebel-controlled parts of Syria. Furthermore, in the earthquake crisis, Stoenescu announced that the EU had foreseen humanitarian exemptions to ease aid distribution and called on the authorities in Damascus not to politicise the humanitarian aid delivery, and to engage in good faith with all humanitarian partners and UN agencies to help the vulnerable people.

During his mandate, Dan Stoenescu has contributed to the European Union's response to the complex and evolving situation in Syria, focusing on humanitarian assistance, political dialogue, and strategic funding allocation to support the Syrian people in the midst of ongoing conflict and crisis.

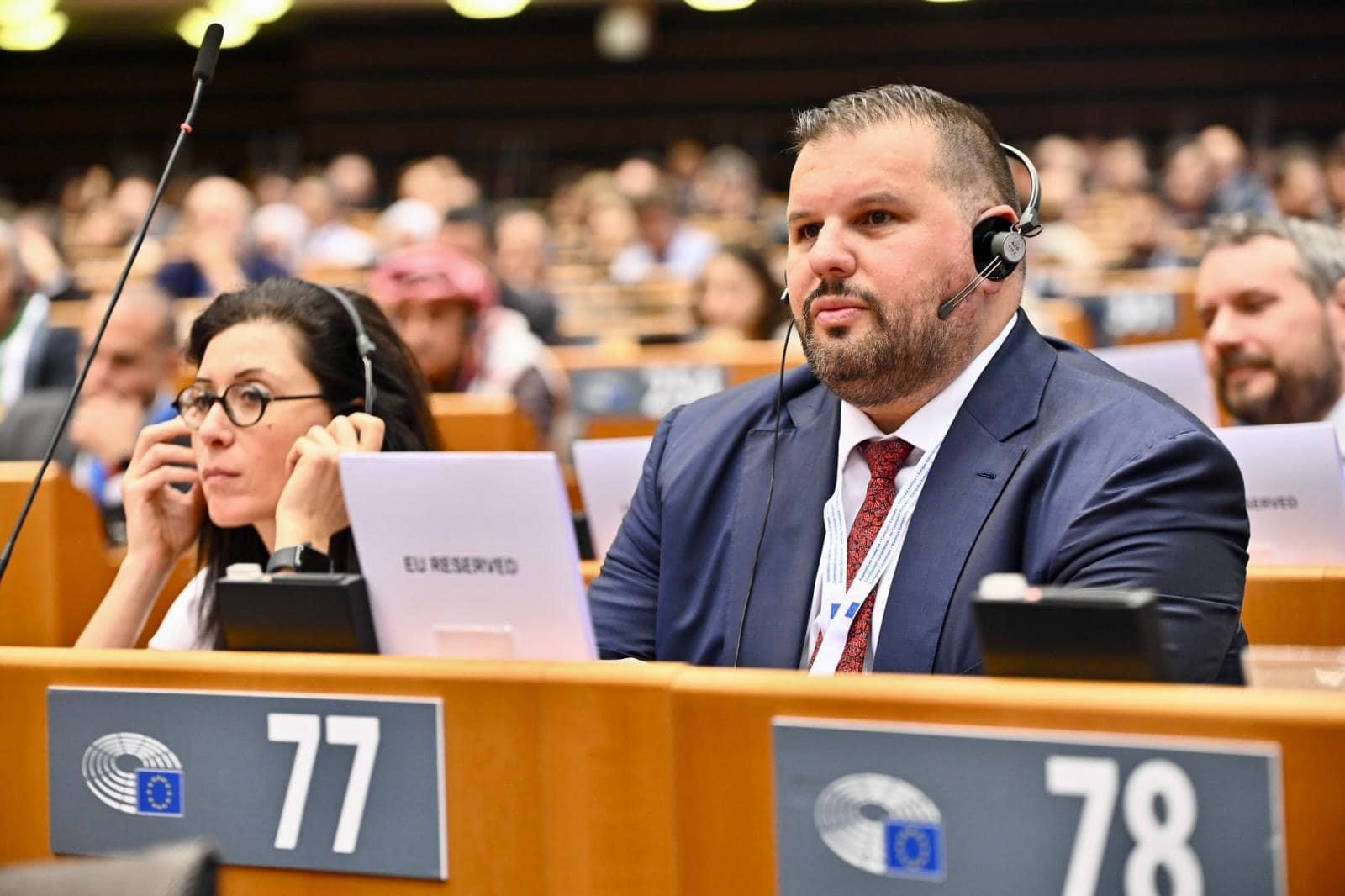
Dan Stoenescu in the European Parliament participating in the “Day of Dialogue” at 8th Brussels Conference on “Supporting the future of Syria and the region”, April 30th 2024

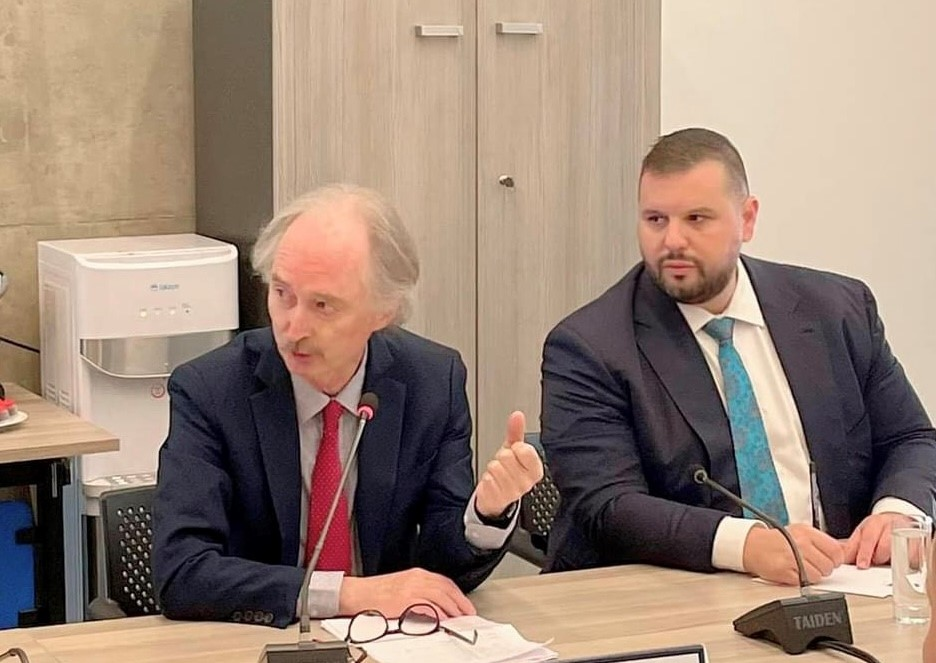
Dan Stoenescu and Geir Pedersen, UN Special Envoy for Syria in Beirut

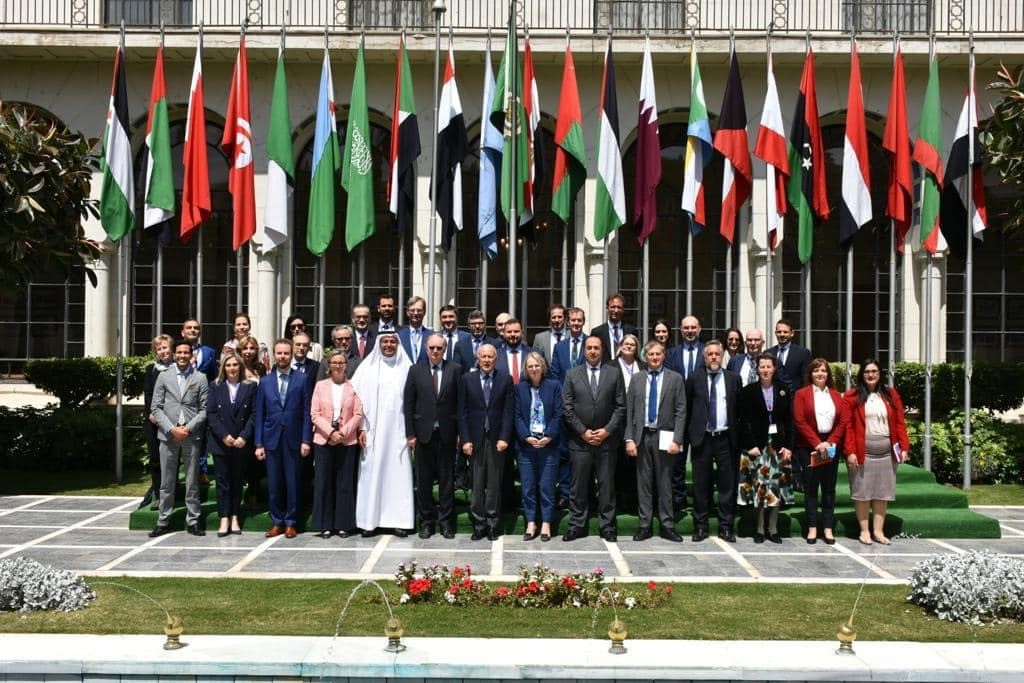
EU and Arab League meeting in Cairo, 2023

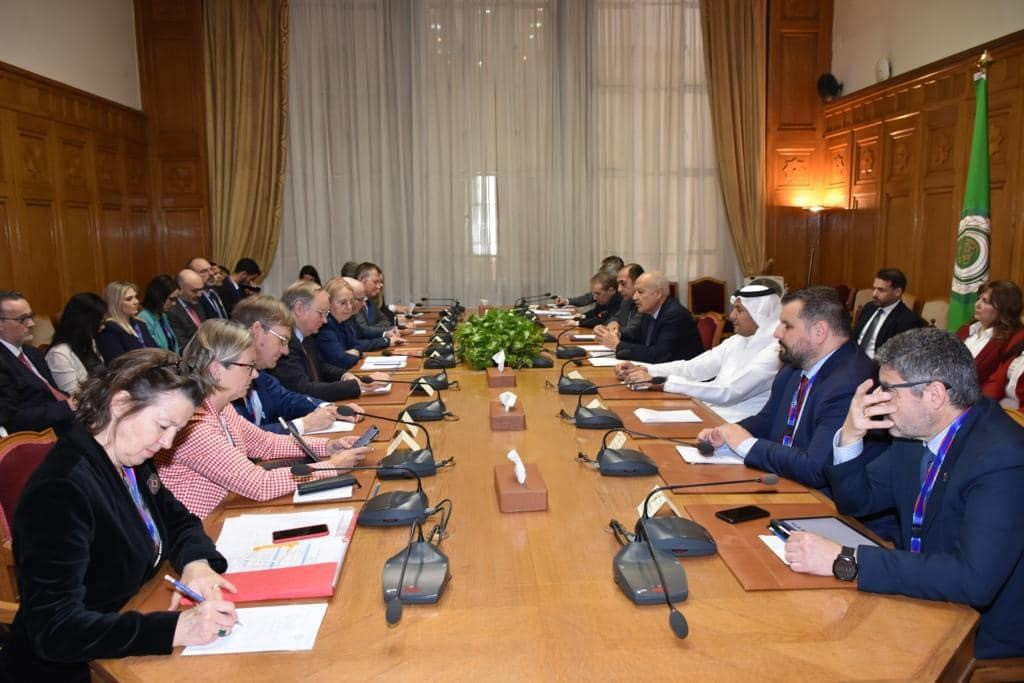
Dan Stoenescu at the EU and League of Arab States meeting in Cairo, 2023

== Ambassadorial mandate in Islamabad ==
The President of Romania, Klaus Iohannis, signed on 21 October 2024 the decree accrediting Mr. Dan Stoenescu as extraordinary and plenipotentiary ambassador of Romania to the Islamic Republic of Pakistan.

In this capacity, Stoenescu promoted high-level political dialogue, institutional cooperation, and the deepening of economic relations between Romania and Pakistan. His activity included contacts with Pakistani officials, initiatives to expand sectoral cooperation, and support for the business environment in identifying trade and investment opportunities.

An important element of his mandate was the promotion of economic diplomacy, including facilitating dialogue between institutions and companies from both states. In this context, on 31 March 2026, a Memorandum of Understanding on port cooperation was signed between the National Company "Maritime Ports Administration" S.A. Constanța and Karachi Port Trust, aiming at developing maritime connectivity and facilitating trade flows between the Black Sea and South Asia.

The mandate also included support for initiatives related to the use of Pakistan’s preferential trade regime under the EU GSP+ scheme, as well as the promotion of cooperation in sectors such as transport, energy, agriculture, and information technology. In this context, the Romanian Embassy facilitated the organization of events dedicated to the technology sector, including a Romania–Pakistan IT Forum, aimed at promoting cooperation in digital development, innovation, and information technology, as well as connecting companies and experts from both countries.

Another pillar of his activity was cultural and educational diplomacy. The Embassy of Romania in Islamabad supported Romanian language courses and the promotion of university studies in Romania among Pakistani students, contributing to academic exchanges and educational mobility.

In 2025, he launched the opera courses initiative at PNCA Islamabad together with soprano Georgiana Costea-Glugă, aiming to promote lyrical arts and strengthen cultural exchanges between Pakistan and Romania, through which Romania contributes to the formation of the first generation of Pakistani opera singers.

In 2026, Stoenescu supported the creation and performance of the first professional choral version of the national anthem of Pakistan (“Qaumi Tarana”), an artistic project carried out by the National Chamber Choir "Madrigal – Marin Constantin". The initiative was praised as an example of intercultural dialogue and innovative cultural heritage promotion. Thus, the anthem created by the Madrigal choir was officially presented in the plenary session of the Pakistani Senate in the presence of the diplomatic corps and Pakistani officials.

During his mandate, Stoenescu contributed to strengthening Romania’s institutional presence in Pakistan, including efforts to expand consular services and facilitate citizen access to them. In this context, initiatives were launched or supported for the opening of an honorary consulate in Peshawar, aimed at strengthening economic relations and people-to-people contacts in the Khyber Pakhtunkhwa region.

Within his mandate, Stoenescu promoted the intensification of political dialogue and parliamentary cooperation between Romania and Pakistan, including contacts with representatives of the Senate and the National Assembly of Pakistan. Regional and international topics were also addressed, such as developments in the Middle East and regional security issues.

His mandate reflects an integrated approach to foreign policy, combining political, economic, and cultural dimensions in order to strengthen bilateral relations and Romania’s profile in South Asia.

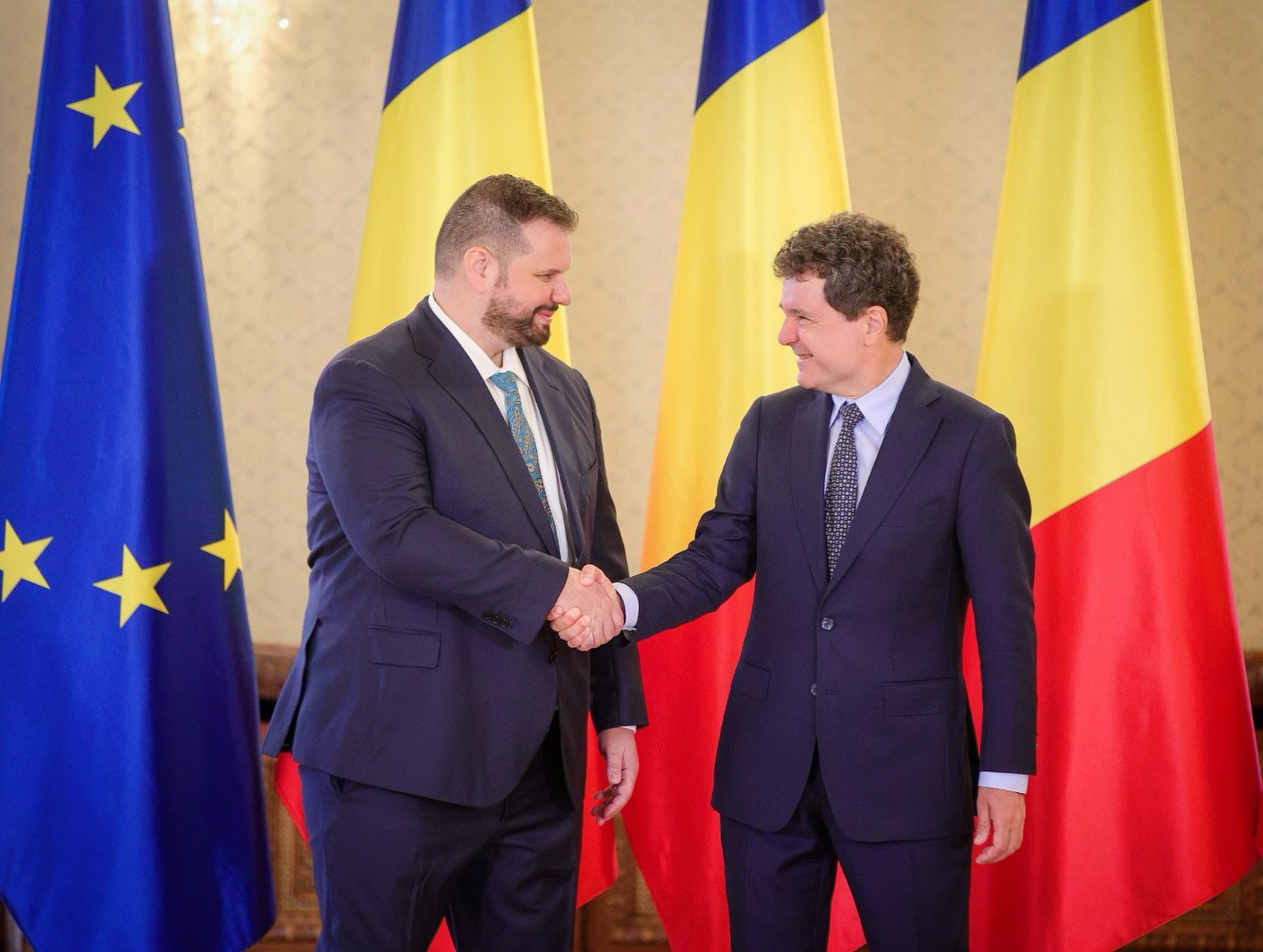
President of Romania Nicușor Dan and Ambassador Dan Stoenescu

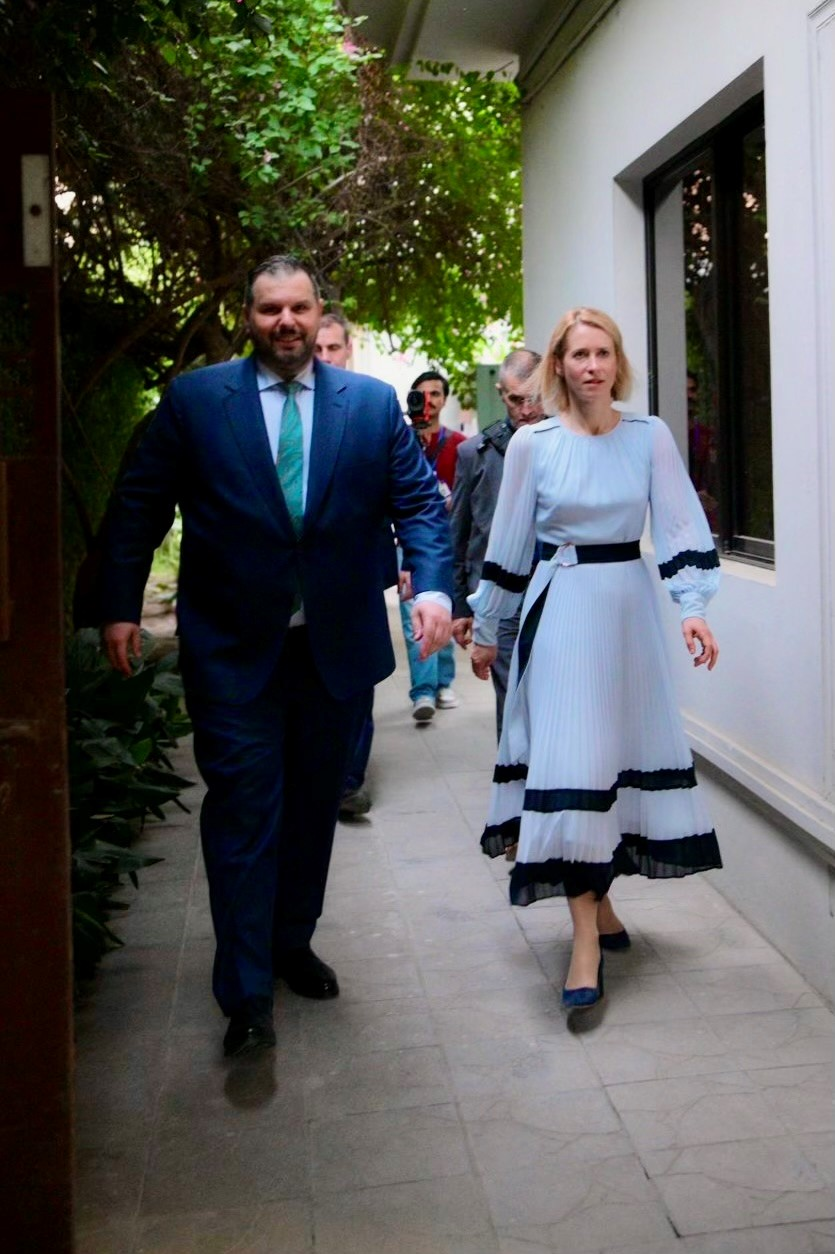
HRVP Kaja Kallas and Ambassador of Romania Dan Stoenescu in Islamabad, June 1st 2026

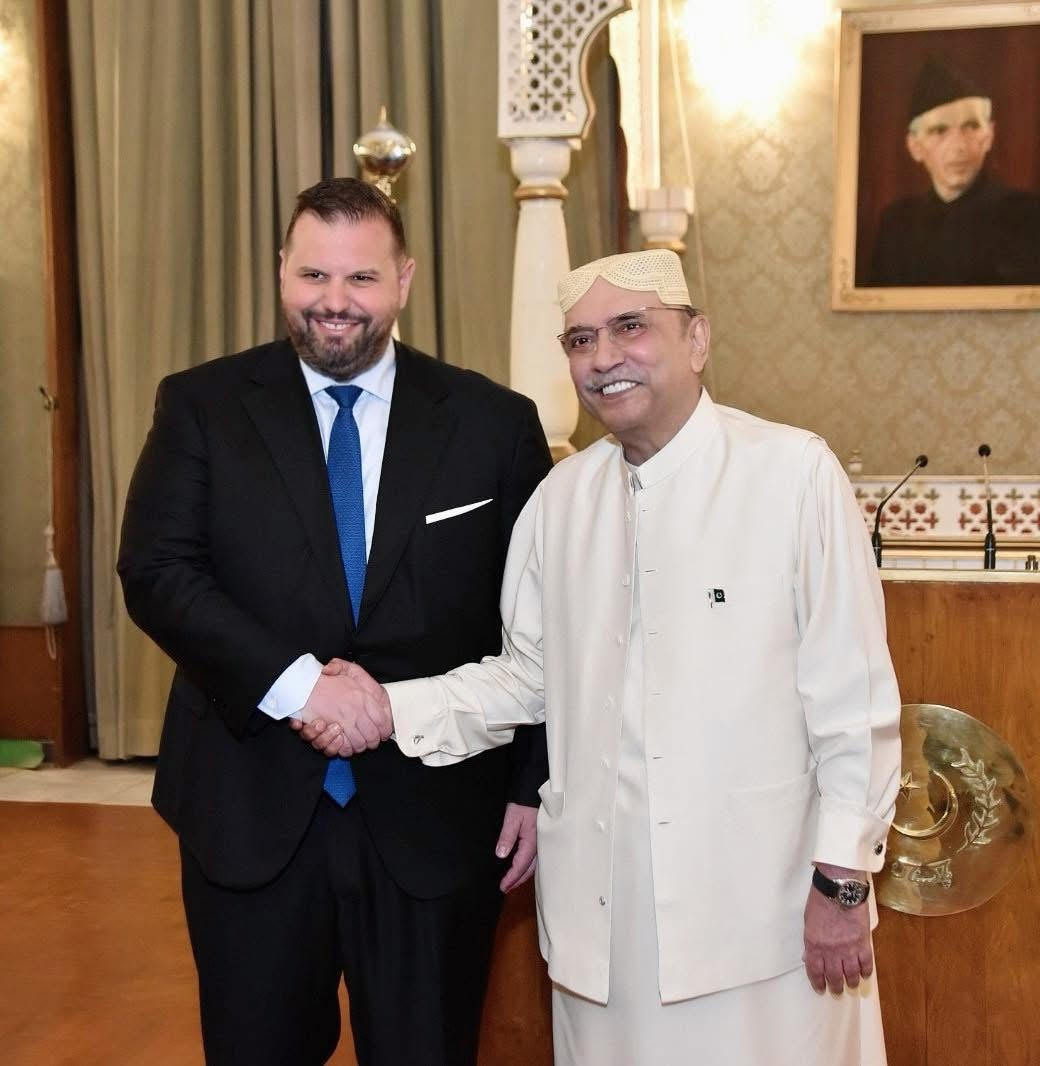
President of Pakistan Asif Ali Zardari and Ambassador of Romania Dan Stoenescu

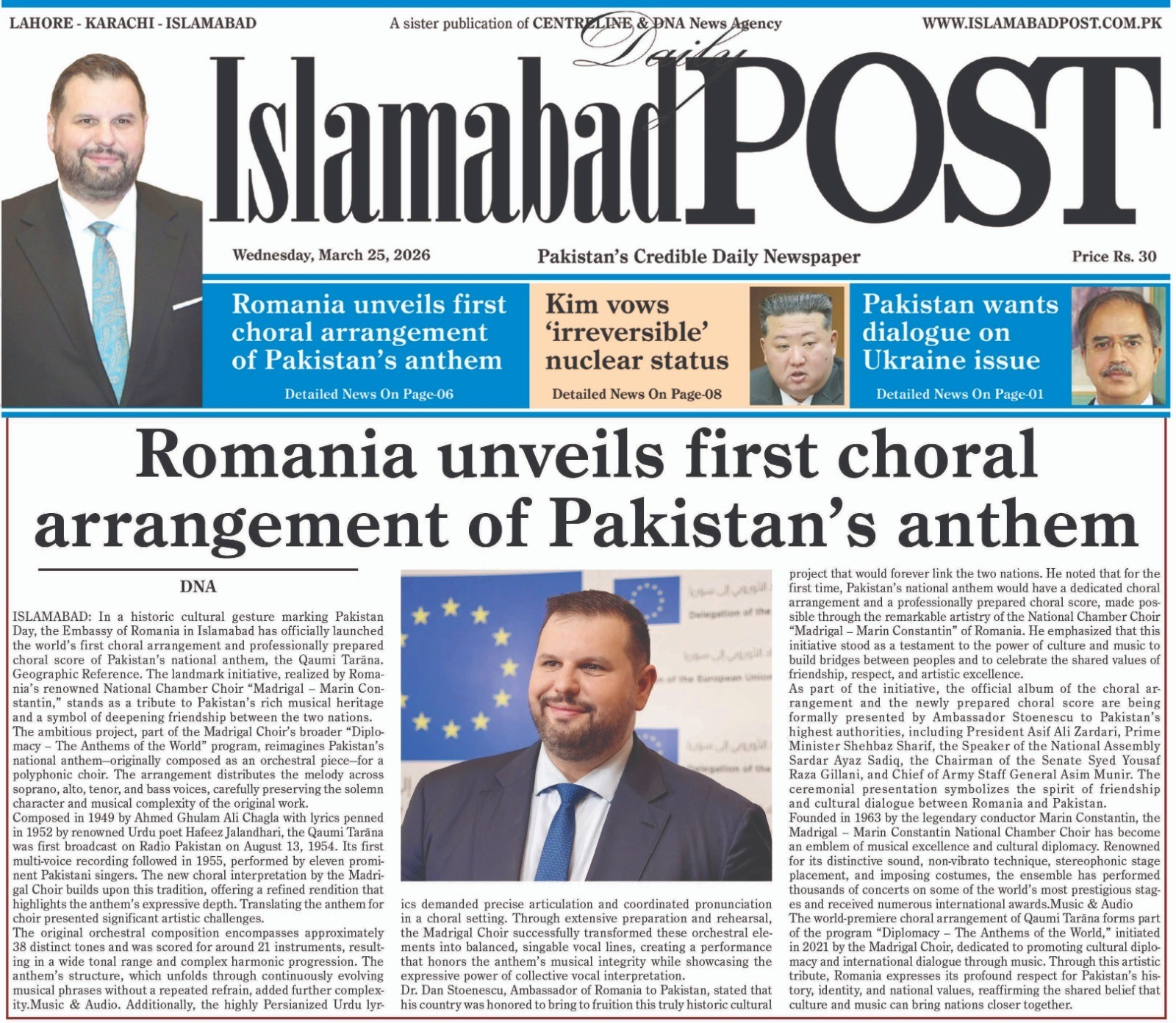
Islamabad Post: Romania unveils first choral arrangement of Pakistan's anthem

== Published academic works ==
- "Islamic and Arab Perspectives on Machiavelli's Virtù", Studia Politica, vol IX, nr.1, 2009.
- "The Egyptian Muslim Brotherhood and the Road Towards the Ummah", Studia Politica, vol VIII, nr.3, 2008.
- "Palestinian Nationalism: From Secularism to Islam", Studia Politica, vol. VII, no. 2, 2007.
- With Dana Pleşa, International Relations and Globalisation in the Middle East, Semne Publishing House, Bucharest, 2005. (ISBN 973-624-310-9)
- "The Concept of Civil Society and the Viability of a Global Civil Society ", Sfera Politicii, nr.116-117/2005, pp. 75–79.
- "Focus on Romanians – a monitoring report on discrimination of Romanians abroad in 2004 ", Liga Tinerilor Români de Pretutindeni.

== Published articles ==
- "La Roumanie – 100 ans après la Grande Union de 1918 ", Realités, published on 27/11/2018.
- "La Roumanie et la Francophonie ", Réalites, published on 4/03/2020.
- "La Roumanie mérite d’avoir un siège non permanent au Conseil de sécurité de l’ONU", L’Orient Le Jour, published on 4/04/2019.
- "La présidence roumaine au Conseil de l'UE s'inscrit dans un contexte européen particulier ", Majalla, published on 3/02/2019.
- "Défis et perspectives pour la présidence roumaine du Conseil de l'Union européenne", Espace Manager, published on 25/03/2019.
- "La Roumanie et la Journée de l’Europe −70 ans depuis la Déclaration Schuman du 9 mai 1950", Tuniscope, published on 11/05/2020
- "La présidence roumaine du Conseil de l’Union européenne s’achève avec succès, selon Dan Stoenescu, ambassadeur de Roumanie", Webmanager Center, published on 18/06/2019.
- "La présidence roumaine du Conseil de l’Union européenne", Réalites, published on 06/07/2019.

== Interviews ==
- "Minister – Delegate for Relations with Romanians Abroad, Dan Stoenescu: “Free Movement within the EU should be a principle all member states adhere to" “Embassy News, Greece”, published on 21/03/2016.
- "On de-communization and openness – Interview with Minister Dan Stoenescu by Mykola Siruk ", “The Day, Ukraine”, published on 2/02/2016.
- "Interviu cu Dan Stoenescu, ministrul Diasporei – Cristian Bucur", “Marca-ro, Canada”, published on 6/01/2016.
- "Interviu cu Ministrul Diasporei – Dan Stoenescu: Sper ca românii se vor întoarce pentru a investi în România, pentru a aduce valoare veniturilor lor, pentru a sprijini dezvoltarea României", “iTimes, Grecia”, published on 19/03/2016.
- "Votul prin corespondență – Interviu cu Dan Stoenescu, de Chihaia Dumitru", “Știri din Belgia”, published on 19/06/2016.
- "Interviu/Stoenescu: Mă îngrijorează numărul redus al celor înscrişi în Registrul Electoral; vreau ca românii să nu mai fie umiliţi ca în trecut ", “AGERPRES”, published on 15/06/2016.
- " Interviu cu ministrul delegat pentru românii de pretutindeni: “Vreau să afirm fără echivoc, aromânii sunt ramura sud-dunăreană a poporului român”, de Alina Ioana Vasiliu", “Constanța noastră”, published on 4/01/2016.
- "Dan Stoenescu: Statul român va sprijini în continuare comunitatea românească din Ucraina – interviu exclusiv", “BucPress, Ucraina”, published on 1/04/2016.
- "Ministrul diasporei Dan Stoenescu: 25 martie – Data propusă pentru Congresul românilor de pretutindeni", “Occidentul românesc”, published on 27/05/2015.
- "Exclusiv// Dan Stoenescu: „Relaţia cu R. Moldova rămâne o prioritate pentru România”", “Ziarul Național, Republica Moldova”, published on 7/03/2016.
- "Dan Stoenescu: „Parcursul european al Chișinăului este esențial în relația dintre România și Republica Moldova, iar națiunea română este numai una!”", “Evenimentul Zilei, Republica Moldova”, published on 12/01/2016.
- "Ministrul diasporei, Dan Stoenescu: „Sunt în serviciul românilor și asta este prioritatea mea!”, de Ana Țuțuianu ", “Ana Țuțuianu – Ziarul Online Românesc din Grecia, Romedia.gr”, published on 21/03/2016.
- "Ministrul Dan Stoenescu: Românii din străinătate își doresc să mențină o legătură cu țara și această legătură se menține prin păstrarea identității românești, de Petre Crăciun", “Identitate românească, România”, published on 14/04/2016.
- "Dan Stoenescu, ministrul delegat pentru relaţiile cu românii de pretutindeni – EXCLUSIVITAŢI RADIO ROMÂNIA – Politica Românească Dan Stoenescu, ministrul delegat pentru relaţiile cu românii de pretutindeni

"Dacă românii din străinătate se înscriu în Registrul Electoral, vor putea vota prin corespondenţă, sau în cadrul unei noi secţii de votare acolo unde ei solicită să fie înfiinţată această secţie de votare".]",“Politica românească”, published on 21/06/2016.

- "Ministrul pentru Românii de Pretutindeni, Dan Stoenescu: Lansăm o campanie de informare privind votul prin corespondenţă, de Cosmin Ruscior ", “Radio France International, Vocile lumii”, published on 26/11/2016.
- "Mesajul ministrului Dan Stoenescu, la comemorarea victimelor Masacrului de la Fântâna Albă, articol de Romeo Crîșmaru", “Jurnal românesc”, published on 1/04/2016.
- "INTERVIU. Ministrul Dan Stoenescu: Un fond de investiții pentru diaspora ar permite întoarcerea românilor acasă, de Petre Badica", “România liberă”, published on 22/12/2015.
- "#CentenarDiplomatic Dan Stoenescu: Tunisia, o vitrină de civilizaţie a lumii arabe în Nordul Africii ", Agerpres, published on 15/04/2018.
- "Interviu acordat de ES dl Ambasador Dan Stoenescu, ambasadorul României în Republica Tunisia", Orient Românesc, published on 04/12/2017.
- "Q&A: Head of the E.U. Delegation to Syria, Dan Stoenescu", “Syria Report”, published on 5/03/2024.
- "Dan Stoenescu Head of EU Delegation to Syria", “Harmoon Center for Contemporary Studies”, published on 20/05/2022.
- "Dan Stoenescu, Chargé d'Affaires of the European Union to Syria: “The situation in Ukraine is also affecting Syria” ", “Veridica, Marian Voicu”, published on 4/11/2022.
- "EU: Over 6.9 million Syrians are in need of educational support", “Fresh Syria”, published on 3/06/2023.
