= Brando Benifei =

Italian politician (born 1986)

Brando Benifei MEP
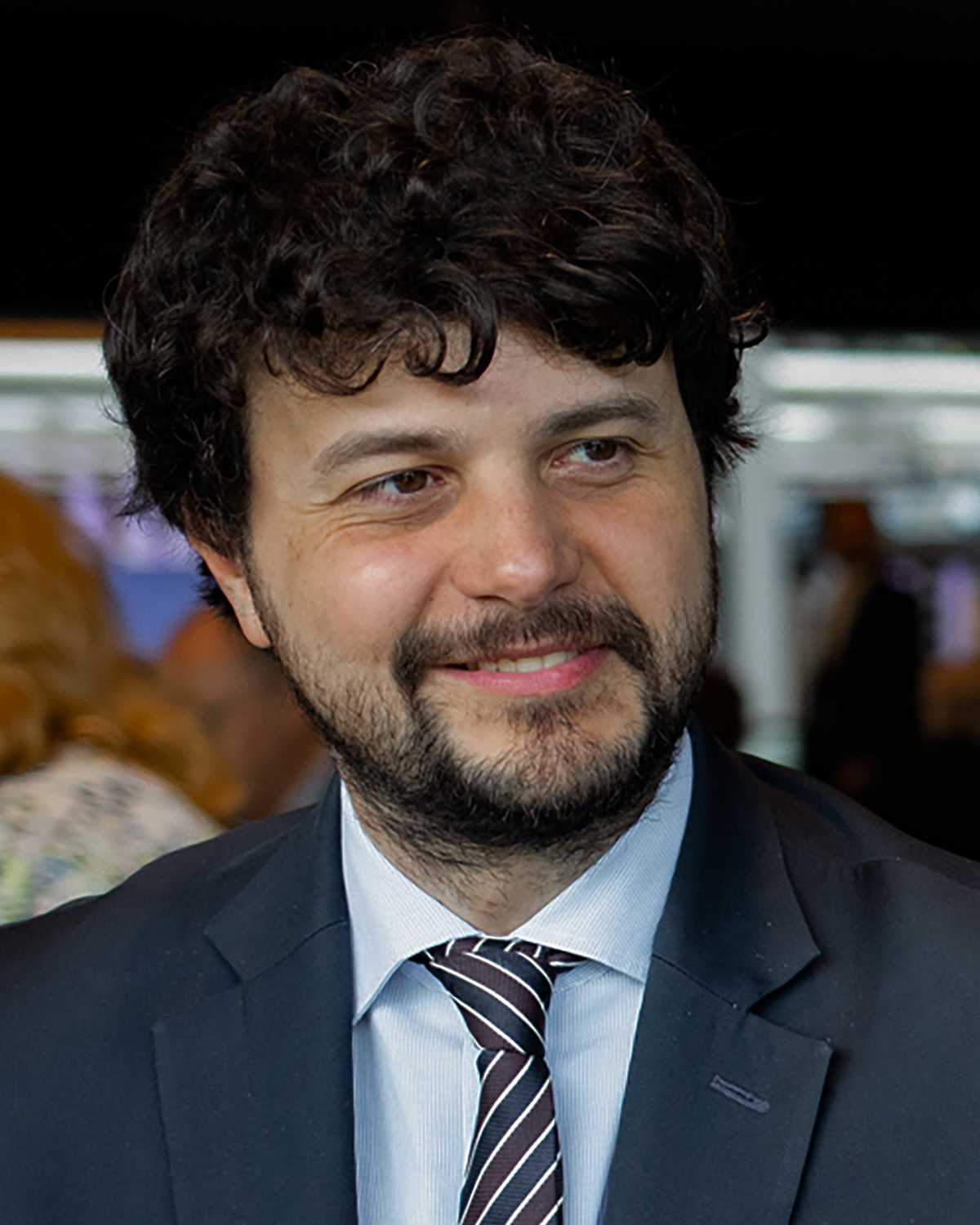

Member of the European Parliament for North-West Italy
- Incumbent
- Assumed office 1 July 2014

Personal details
- Born: 1 January 1986 (age 40)
- Party: PD (since 2007); DS (2002–2007)
- Education: University of Bologna

Brando Maria Benifei (born 1 January 1986) is an Italian politician. Born in La Spezia, Benifei started his political career with the Democrats of the Left in 2002. In 2007, he joined the Democratic Party, with which he has served as a member of the European Parliament since 2014. He was re-elected in 2019 and 2024.

== Political career ==
During his first term from 2014 until 2019, Benifei served on the Committee on Employment and Social Affairs. In 2019, he moved to the Committee on the Internal Market and Consumer Protection. In 2020, he also joined the Special Committee on Artificial Intelligence in a Digital Age. In this capacity, he serves as the Parliament's lead rapporteur on the Artificial Intelligence Act (2021). Since 2021, he has been part of the Parliament's delegation to the Conference on the Future of Europe.

In addition to his committee assignments, Benifei is a member of the European Parliament Intergroup on Anti-Corruption, the European Parliament Intergroup on the Digital Agenda, the European Parliament Intergroup on Fighting against Poverty, the European Parliament Intergroup on Seas, Rivers, Islands and Coastal Areas, the European Parliament Intergroup on Small and Medium-Sized Enterprises (SMEs), the European Parliament Intergroup on Cancer, the MEP Alliance for Mental Health, the European Parliament Intergroup on Disability, the MEPs Against Cancer group, and of the UNITE – Parliamentary Network to End HIV/AIDS, Viral Hepatitis and Other Infectious Diseases.

In 2024, Benifei was the joint winner, alongside Romanian MEP Dragoș Tudorache, of the "MEP of the Mandate" award at The Parliament Magazine's annual MEP Awards.

He supports Laicism and LGBTQIA+ rights.

== Other activities ==
- Reimagine Europa, Member of the Advisory Board

== See also ==
- 2014 European Parliament election in Italy
- 2019 European Parliament election in Italy
