= Florin Iordache =

Romanian politician (born 1960)

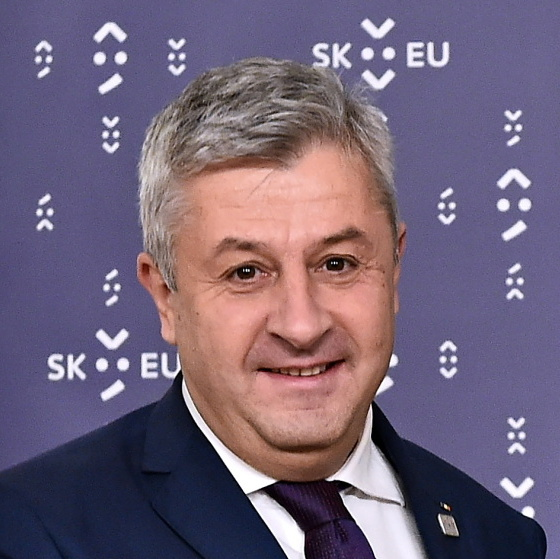
- Iordache in 2016

Minister of Justice
- In office January 4, 2017 – February 9, 2017
- President: Klaus Iohannis
- Prime Minister: Sorin Grindeanu
- Preceded by: Raluca Prună
- Succeeded by: Ana Birchall (acting)

President of the Chamber of Deputies of Romania
- In office June 13, 2016 – December 21, 2016
- Preceded by: Valeriu Zgonea
- Succeeded by: Liviu Dragnea

Member of the Chamber of Deputies from Olt County
- Incumbent
- Assumed office 2000

Personal details
- Born: 14 December 1960 (age 65)
- Party: Social Democratic Party
- Occupation: Politician

Florin Iordache (Romanian pronunciation: [floˈrin jorˈdake]; born 14 December 1960) is a Romanian politician. A member of the Social Democratic Party, he served as Minister of Justice from 4 January to 9 February 2017, resigning due to pressure from the 2017–2019 Romanian protests.

== Biography ==
Iordache was born on 14 December 1960.

=== Chamber of Deputies ===
Iordache is a member of the Social Democratic Party. He has been a member of the Chamber of Deputies since 2000, representing his native Olt County. He also served as President of the Chamber between 13 June 2016 and 21 December 2016. During the 2012–2016 legislature, he was chairman of the Committee for Labor and Social Protection, and was a member of the Committees for Legal Affairs, Discipline and Immunities, and for Rules of Procedure. He works in French. By 2019, he was vice-president of the Chamber.

=== Minister of Justice ===
Iordache became Minister of Justice on 4 January 2017. On 31 January, the Justice Ministry passed an emergency ordinance to pardon several politicians charged with malfeasance in office who were fined for less than €44,000, which would have gone into effect on 10 February. Iordache was a major figure in its creation. Although the Romanian government stated it was to lower prison populations, protesters in the 2017 Romanian protests demanded he resign for corruption. The ordinance was repealed on 5 February, never going into effect.

Iordache headed a special parliamentary commission discussing a judicial overhaul that is a threat to the judiciary's independence. He announced his resignation as Justice Minister on 9 February, amid antigovernment protests. His resignation statement lasted 45 seconds, with him refusing to answer questions from journalists. Prime Minister Sorin Grindeanu stated he "already made up his mind regarding the fate of Iordache" and had planned to execute his plan after a meeting on 10 February.

=== Legislative Council ===
In 2020, Iordache was appointed president for life of the Romanian Legislative Council, being elected in a vote of 185–43. In May 2026, he and the Council accused Prime Minister Ilie Bolojan of violating the Constitution of Romania by adopting the ordinance OUG 38, a law attackng investments in defense and energy, as laws of that vein were previously declared illegal.
