= Cioloș cabinet =

125th Government of Romania

Cioloș Cabinet
- 125th Cabinet of Romania

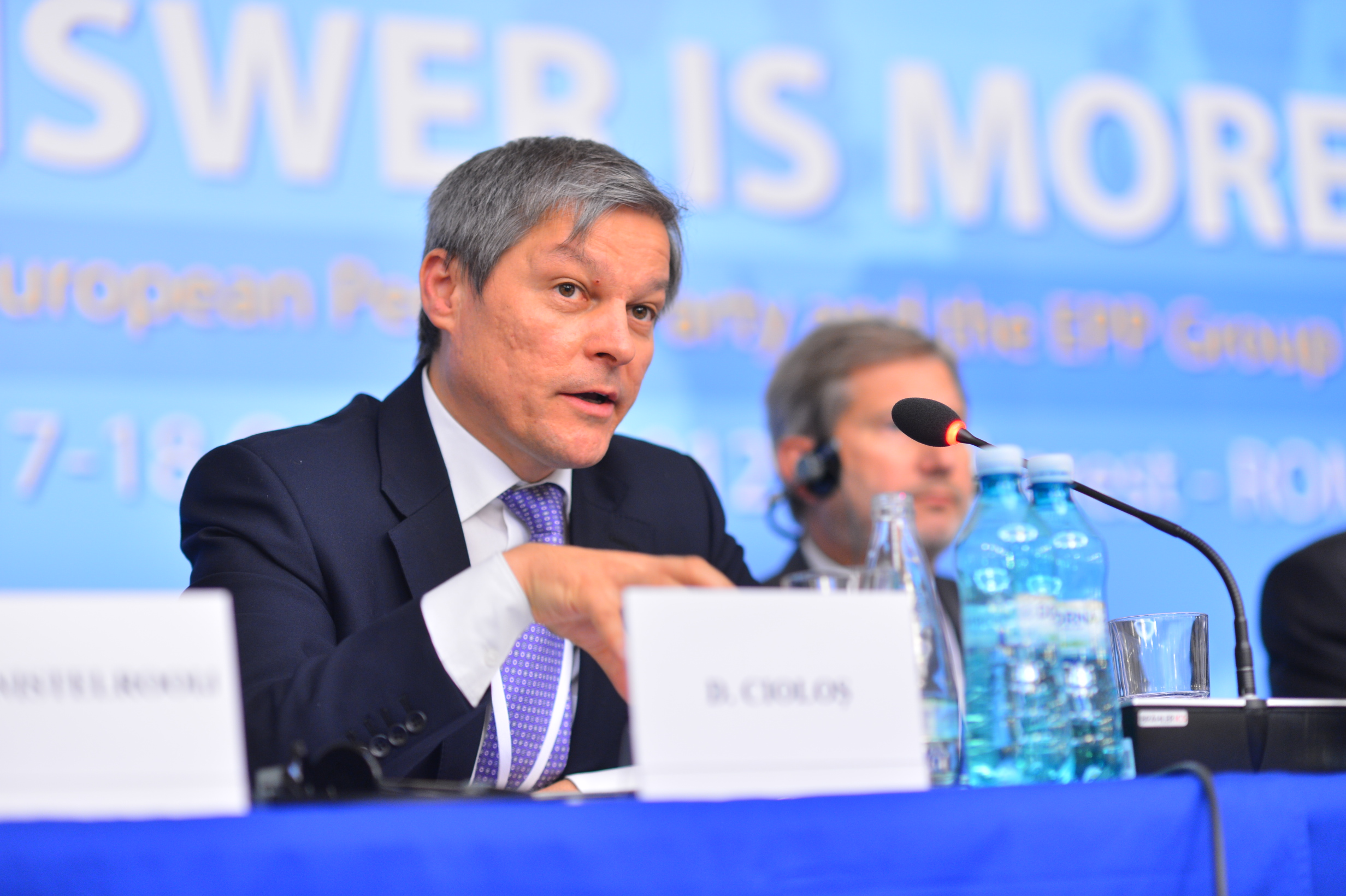
- Dacian Cioloș, head of Government
- Date formed: 17 November 2015
- Date dissolved: 4 January 2017

People and organisations
- President: Klaus Iohannis
- Head of government: Dacian Cioloș
- No. of ministers: 21
- Member party: None
- Status in legislature: Technocratic cabinet (Majority); Supported by PSD, PNL, UDMR, UNPR, and minorities
- Opposition party: ALDE, PMP

History
- Outgoing election: 2012
- Legislature term: 2012–2016
- Predecessor: Ponta IV
- Successor: Grindeanu

The Cioloș Cabinet was the 125th Government of Romania. It was led by Dacian Cioloș, who was appointed Prime Minister of Romania on 10 November 2015, after the resignation of Victor Ponta amid mass protests against generalised corruption linked to the Colectiv nightclub fire. It consisted of 21 ministers. No member of the Cabinet was formally affiliated with a political organisation (except for a PSD minister).

== History ==
After the resignation of Victor Ponta amid November 2015 protests, President Klaus Iohannis nominated on 10 November Dacian Cioloș, former Romanian Minister of Agriculture and European Commissioner, to form a new government. Five days later, Cioloș presented the list of proposed ministers. Two of the initial nominees, Andrei Baciu for the Ministry of Health and Cristina Guseth for the Ministry of Justice, were withdrawn.

The Cioloș Cabinet received the vote of confidence from the Parliament of Romania on 17 November, the result being 389 votes "for", 115 "against" and two invalid votes. In his speech to senators and deputies, the premier stated that his team did not want to and could not replace the political class, alluding to criticism raised by Călin Popescu-Tăriceanu and other MPs who said that the technocratic formula practically abolished the parliament.

== Composition ==
Image	Position	Ministers	Party	In office since	Until
	Prime Minister	Dacian Cioloș	Ind.	17 November 2015	4 January 2017
Deputy Prime Ministers
	Deputy Prime Minister and Minister of Regional Development and Public Administration	Vasile Dîncu	PSD	17 November 2015	4 January 2017
	Deputy Prime Minister and Minister of Economy, Trade and Tourism	Costin Borc	Ind.	17 November 2015	4 January 2017
Ministers
	Minister of Foreign Affairs	Lazăr Comănescu	Ind.	17 November 2015	4 January 2017
	Minister of Internal Affairs	Petre Tobă	Ind.	17 November 2015	1 September 2016
	Minister of Internal Affairs	Dragoș Tudorache	Ind.	6 September 2016	4 January 2017
	Minister of National Defense	Mihnea Motoc	Ind.	17 November 2015	4 January 2017
	Minister of Public Finance	Anca Dragu	Ind.	17 November 2015	4 January 2017
	Minister of Agriculture and Rural Development	Achim Irimescu	Ind.	17 November 2015	4 January 2017
	Minister of Energy, Small and Medium Enterprises and Business Environment	Victor Grigorescu	Ind.	17 November 2015	4 January 2017
	Minister of National Education and Scientific Research	Adrian Curaj	Ind.	17 November 2015	5 July 2016
	Minister of National Education and Scientific Research	Mircea Dumitru	Ind.	7 July 2016	4 January 2017
	Minister of Culture	Vlad Alexandrescu	Ind.	17 November 2015	3 May 2016
	Minister of Culture	Corina Șuteu	Ind.	4 May 2016	4 January 2017
	Minister of European Funds	Aura Răducu	Ind.	17 November 2015	27 April 2016
	Minister of European Funds	Cristian Ghinea	Ind.	27 April 2016	26 October 2016
	Minister of European Funds	Dragoș Dinu	Ind.	27 October 2016	4 January 2017
	Minister of Justice	Raluca Prună	Ind.	17 November 2015	4 January 2017
	Minister of Environment, Water and Forests	Cristiana Pașca-Palmer	Ind.	17 November 2015	4 January 2017
	Minister of Labor, Family, Social Protection and Elderly	Claudia Costea	Ind.	17 November 2015	14 April 2016
	Minister of Labor, Family, Social Protection and Elderly	Dragoș Pîslaru	Ind.	18 April 2016	4 January 2017
	Minister for Information Society	Marius Bostan	Ind.	17 November 2015	5 July 2016
	Minister for Information Society	Dragoș Tudorache	Ind.	7 July 2016 ad interim	10 August 2016
	Minister for Information Society	Delia Popescu	Ind.	10 August 2016	4 January 2017
	Minister of Health	Patriciu Achimaș-Cadariu	Ind.	17 November 2015	9 May 2016
	Minister of Health	Vlad Voiculescu	Ind.	20 May 2016	4 January 2017
	Minister of Youth and Sport	Elisabeta Lipă	Ind.	17 November 2015	4 January 2017
	Minister of Transport	Dan Costescu	Ind.	17 November 2015	5 July 2016
	Minister of Transport	Sorin Bușe	Ind.	7 July 2016	4 January 2017
Ministers Delegates
	Minister Delegate for Social Dialogue	Violeta Alexandru	Ind.	17 November 2015	4 January 2017
	Minister Delegate for Relations with Romanians Abroad	Dan Stoenescu	Ind.	17 November 2015	5 July 2016
	Minister Delegate for Relations with Romanians Abroad	Maria Ligor	Ind.	7 July 2016	4 January 2017
	Minister Delegate for Relations with Parliament	Ciprian Bucur	Ind.	17 November 2015	4 January 2017
