= Eugen Nicolăescu =

Romanian politician

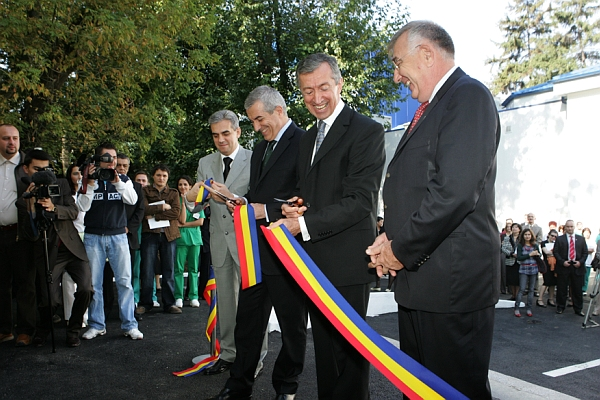
Eugen Nicolăescu (left) opening the Filantropia Hospital in Bucharest

Gheorghe-Eugen Nicolăescu (born 2 August 1955) is a Romanian economist and politician. A member of the National Liberal Party (PNL), he was a member of the Romanian Chamber of Deputies for Mureș County from 2000 to 2008 and has represented Călărași County there since 2008. In the Călin Popescu-Tăriceanu cabinet, he served as Minister of Health from 2005 to 2008.

== Biography ==
Nicolăescu was born in Grădiștea village, Comana Commune, Giurgiu County. Between 1976 and 1985, he was successively technologist, sales clerk, commodities economist and economist at various Bucharest hotels, including Athénée Palace. He took a hiatus in 1976–1977 in order to fulfill his mandatory military service, and in 1982 graduated from the Commerce Faculty of the Bucharest Academy of Economic Studies (ASE), earning a doctorate in Economics from the same institution in 2007. From 1985 to 1987, Nicolăescu was a computer analyst dealing with supplies at the special equipment factory of the Ministry of Industry and Resources. From 1987 to 1990, he was an economist in the supplies division of the same factory. Following the fall of the Communist regime, from 1990 to 1998, he worked at the military equipment company Ratmil, successively as head of supplies, supplies economist, head of budget and economic analysis, economic director and general director. From 1998 to 1999, he was economic director at a construction firm. From 1999 to 2000, he was adjunct secretary general at the Ministry of Public Finance. In 2000, he was head of the interim national committee on real property values, but resigned. In 2000–2001, he was assistant professor at Spiru Haret University, holding the same title at ASE from 2001 to 2002. He has several publications in his field.

Nicolăescu has held a number of positions within his party: head of the Mureș County chapter (2001–2004; 2005–2008), head of the auditing committee (2001–2002), member of the executive bureau and press spokesman (2002–2006), member of the permanent central bureau (2005–2007), and vice president and member of the central political bureau (2007–present). Elected to the Chamber in 2000, 2004 and 2008, he has sat on the following committees: budget, finance, and banking (2000–present); equality of opportunity between women and men (2004–2005; 2008–2009); relations with UNESCO (2004–2008); European affairs (2008–present); 1989 revolutionaries (2008–2009). He has been deputy leader (2001–2002; 2004; 2008–present) and leader (2004–2005) of the PNL group in the Chamber. Additionally, he was Health Minister under Tăriceanu from August 2005 until December 2008, when the cabinet lost power following the election the previous month. Among his actions as minister were to dismiss a number of hospital directors for mismanagement, and to issue regulations imposing a partial smoking ban. One legislative proposal he helped initiate in 2005 was for a lustration law meant to exclude former Communist officials from public office. In 2010, the National Integrity Agency recommended that prosecutors file charges against Nicolăescu for allegedly saving PNL funds in his personal bank accounts. In 2012, he became head of the PNL's Bucharest chapter, replacing Andrei Chiliman.

He is married and has two children.
