= Dragoș Tudorache =

Romanian politician

Dragoș Tudorache MEP
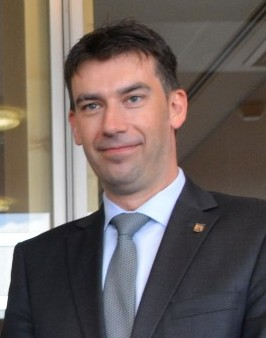

Minister of Internal Affairs of Romania
- In office 6 September 2016 – 4 January 2017
- Preceded by: Petre Tobă
- Succeeded by: Carmen Daniela Dan

Member of the European Parliament for Romania
- Incumbent
- Assumed office 2019

Personal details
- Born: 14 January 1975 (age 51) Vaslui, Vaslui County, Romania
- Party: USR PLUS/USR
- Education: Alexandru Ioan Cuza University
- Occupation: Judge; Politician; Lawyer

Dragoș Tudorache (born 14 January 1975) is a Romanian politician of USR PLUS/USR who has been serving as a Member of the European Parliament since 2019.

== Early career ==
From 2000, Tudorache worked as the coordinator of analysis team in the Department of Rule of Law and Protection of Human Rights of the Organization for Security and Co-operation in Europe (OSCE) in Pristina. Between 2003 and 2005 he served as the Head of the Legal Department of the UN team of International Judges at the United Nations Interim Administration Mission in Kosovo (UNMIK).

From 2005 until 2007, Tudorache worked at the Delegation of the European Commission in Bucharest, where he was responsible for legal and anti-corruption issues. In 2007 he joined the European Commission's Directorate-General for Migration and Home Affairs in Brussels.

== Political career ==
=== Career in national politics ===
On 17 September 2016, Dragoș Tudorache was appointed Minister of Internal Affairs, after having previously been head of the chancellery in the Cioloș Cabinet, an apolitical, technocratic government. He held this position until 4 January 2017, when the Grindeanu Cabinet was invested, following the legislative elections.

Immediately after the establishment of the Party of Freedom, Unity and Solidarity Party (PLUS) on 15 December 2018, Tudorache joined this party and ran in its internal elections for the 2019 European elections.

=== Member of the European Parliament, 2019–present ===
Following the 2019 elections, Tudorache was part of a cross-party working group in charge of drafting the European Parliament's five-year work program on the rule of law, borders and migration. He later joined the Committee on Civil Liberties, Justice and Home Affairs, the Special Committee on Artificial Intelligence in a Digital Age the Committee of Inquiry to investigate the use of Pegasus and equivalent surveillance spyware (since 2022). In this capacity, he is his parliamentary group's rapporteur on the United States–European Union relations and the Artificial Intelligence Act. In 2021, he also joined the parliament's working group on Frontex, led by Roberta Metsola.

In addition to his committee assignments, Tudorache is part of the Parliament's delegations for relations with the United States and with Bosnia and Herzegovina, and Kosovo. He is also a member of the European Parliament Intergroup on Anti-Corruption.

Since 2021, Tudorache has been serving as deputy chair of the Renew Europe parliamentary group, under the leadership of chair Stéphane Séjourné.

In 2024, Tudorache was the joint winner, alongside Italian MEP Brando Benifei, of the "MEP of the Mandate" award at The Parliament Magazine's annual MEP Awards.

== Political positions ==
In 2021, Tudorache joined seven other Romanian MEPs in co-signing a letter to Ursula von der Leyen and Maroš Šefčovič in which they call on the European Commission to stop the United Kingdom from holding EU nationals in immigration removal centers.
