= Carmen Dan =

Romanian politician

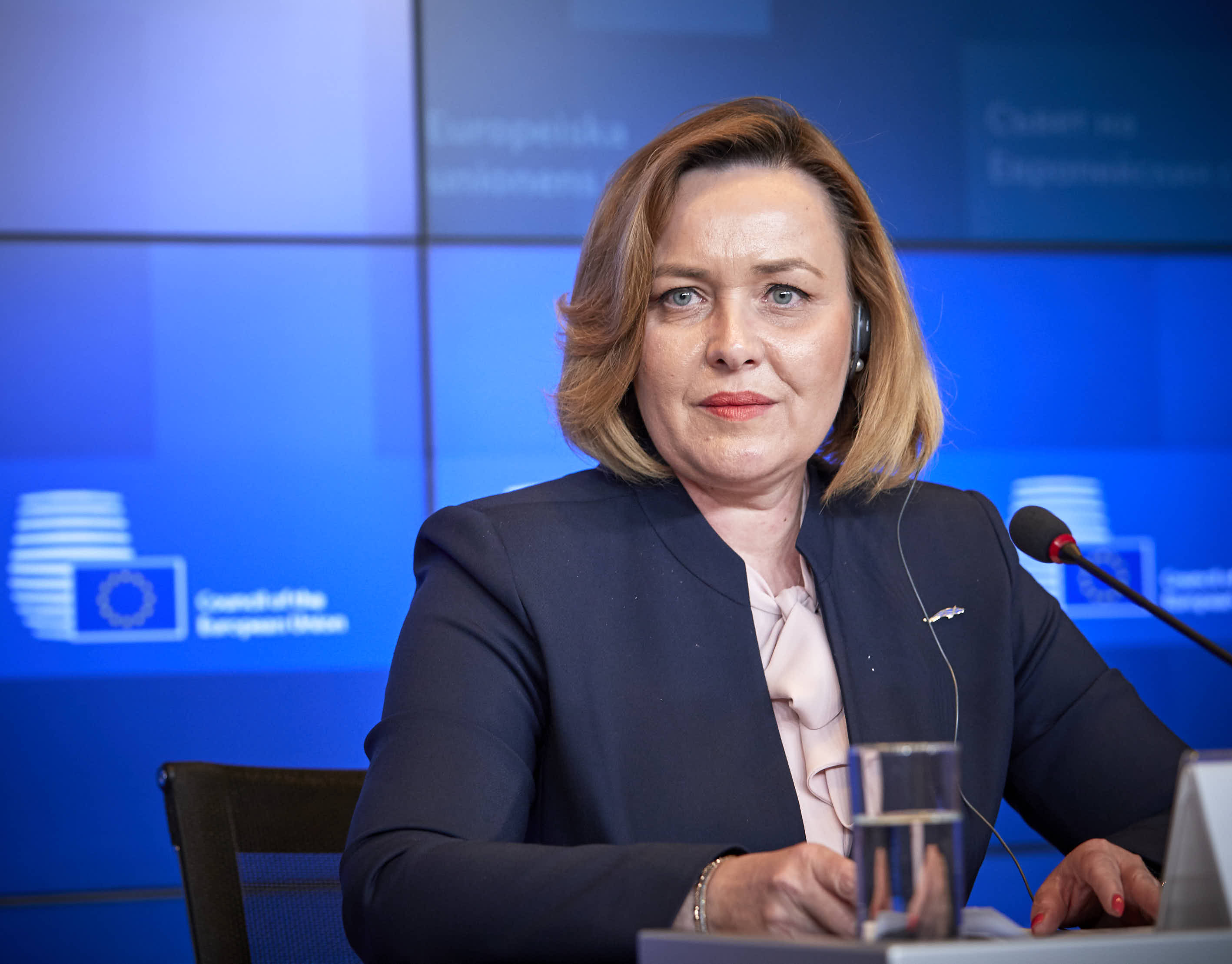

Minister of Internal Affairs
- In office 4 January 2017 – 24 July 2019
- President: Klaus Iohannis
- Prime Minister: Sorin Grindeanu; Mihai Tudose; Viorica Dăncilă
- Preceded by: Dragoș Tudorache
- Succeeded by: Nicolae Moga

Member of the Senate of Romania
- In office 21 December 2016 – 21 December 2020
- Constituency: Teleorman

Personal details
- Born: 9 October 1970 (age 55) Bucharest, Romanian People's Republic
- Citizenship: Romanian
- Party: Social Democratic Party (until 2021); Alliance for the Homeland (2021–2023); Sovereign Romania Movement Party (since 2023)

Carmen Daniela Dan (born 9 October 1970) is a Romanian politician. She served in the Senate of Romania from 2016 to 2020 representing the Social Democratic Party. She also served as Minister of Internal Affairs of Romania in the Grindeanu Cabinet, Tudose Cabinet and Dăncilă Cabinet from January 2017 to July 2019. Prior to her political career, she was secretary of the General School no. 3 of Videle, and an employee of Bănca Agricole and Raiffeisen Bank.

== Biography ==
Dan was born in Bucharest on 9 October 1970 and graduated from the "Zoia Kosmodemianskaia" High School of Philology and History in Bucharest in 1989. In July 2000, she graduated from the "Alexandru Ioan Cuza" Police Academy, after graduating from the Faculty of Law at the Ecological University of Bucharest. In 2004, she received her master's degree in European public affairs management from the Bucharest Academy of Economic Studies.

Between September 1990 and July 1996, Dan was secretary at the General School no. 3 of Videle, and from March to September 1990, was secretary of the Provisional Council of the National Union (CPUN). From November 2001 to July 2002, she held the position of front desk teller at Raiffeisen, and from July 1996 to November 2001, she was a contact person at Banca Agricolă in Videle. From December 2010 to June 2012, she was the executive director of the Community Public Service for the Evidence of Persons of Teleorman County within the County Council, and from July 2002 to December 2010, Dan was a legal advisor to the Legal and Litigation Service of the same County Council.
