= Petre Tobă =

Romanian politician

Minister of Internal Affairs
- In office 17 November 2015 – 1 September 2016
- President: Klaus Iohannis
- Prime Minister: Dacian Cioloș
- Preceded by: Gabriel Oprea
- Succeeded by: Dragoș Tudorache

Personal details
- Born: 18 June 1964 (age 62) Bucharest, Romanian People's Republic
- Citizenship: Romanian
- Children: Cosmin Tobă
- Education: Technical University of Civil Engineering of Bucharest; Alexandru Ioan Cuza Police Academy; Carol I National Defence University
- Profession: Police officer
- Awards: Order of the Star of Romania, Knight class National Order of Faithful Service, Officer class National Order of Merit (Romania), Knight class

Petre Tobă (born 18 June 1964) is a Romanian politician who served as Minister of Internal Affairs of Romania in the Cioloș Cabinet from 17 November 2015 to 1 September 2016.

Born in Bucharest, he studied engineering at the Technical University of Civil Engineering of Bucharest from 1985 to 1989. He then pursued a Law degree from the Alexandru Ioan Cuza Police Academy from 1996 to 2000, and a master's degree from the Carol I National Defence University from 2006 to 2007. In 2009 he became Inspector General of the Romanian Police.

His awards include the Order of the Star of Romania, Knight class and the National Order of Faithful Service, Officer class, and the National Order of Merit, Knight class. Copii:Cosmin Tobă
