= Federation of Western Thrace Turks in Europe =

The Federation of Western Thrace Turks in Europe (Turkish: Avrupa Batı Trakya Türk Federasyonu, short: ABTTF, Greek: Ευρωπαϊκή Ομοσπονδία Τούρκων Δυτικής Θράκης, short: ΕΟΤΔΘ) was established in Germany in 1988 by seven founding associations, as a nonprofit umbrella organization and dissolved in 2013. With the Association of Western Thrace Turks in the UK, the organisation adopted its current name.

ABTTF is headquartered in Witten, Germany and since 2010, has maintained an office in Brussels, Belgium. The organization has 29 member associations in Germany and one in England. In total, the ABTTF unites 6,000 affiliated members. It is the first organization to be granted special consultative status by the United Nations Economic and Social Council as a representative body of the Turkish Minority of Western Thrace.

== History ==
The convention concerning the exchange of Greek and Turkish populations that was signed on 30 January 1923, in the aftermath of the Greco-Turkish War (1919–1922), exempted the Muslim Turkish population living in Western Thrace and the Greek Orthodox minority in Istanbul and on the islands of Imbros (Gökçeada) and Tenedos (Bozcaada).

Under the Treaty of Lausanne, a population of 150,000 Muslims of various ethnicities living in Western Thrace, such as Turks, Pomaks and Romas, were granted official minority status. The Muslim minority's status in Western Thrace is explicitly defined within Articles 37-44 of the Lausanne Treaty. According to the officially granted minority status within Section III, Turks in Western Thrace were given equal rights to “establish, manage and control at their own expense any charitable, religious and social institutions, any schools and other establishments for instruction and education, with the right to use their own language and to exercise their own religion freely therein”.

Beginning in the 1950s, Greek non-compliance with Treaty obligations extended to considerable human rights violations. Growing political instability due to the Greek Civil War and Greek military junta of 1967-1974 that followed further instigated Greek nationalism and exacerbated the situation of minorities, including the Turks living in Western Thrace.

In the 1960s and 1970s, increased tensions over Greece-Turkey relations were reflected as suppression and assimilation policies that targeted Turks. The policies put in place by Greek authorities to intimidate the Turkish minority manifested themselves as “dissolution” of the minority and eventually leaving territories by means of “forced migration”. Article 19 of Greek Nationality Code, which was in force from 1955 to 1998, stipulated that “a person of non-Greek ethic origin leaving Greece without the intention of returning may be declared as having lost Greek nationality....” The Turkish minority was forced to migrate. While the vast majority of migration wave was towards Turkey, some groups chose to migrate to other European countries, in particular to Germany.

Today, the population of Western Thrace Turks in Germany amounts to 30,000. A considerable number of Western Thrace Turks live in other EU Member States, such as the Netherlands, England, Sweden, France, Belgium and Austria. The need to keep alive their cultural values and maintain solidarity in their host countries led the Western Thrace Turks to create collectively created associations.

In Germany, the first Western Thrace Turks Association was established on 1 January 1978 in Giessen of the state Hessen. This was followed by other Western Thrace Turks Associations including in Stuttgart, Homburg/Saar, Munich, Düsseldorf, Kelsterbach. The rise in the number of associations was a response to the assimilation policies Greece has pursued against the minority population.

During the 1980s, successive Greek governments continued their suppression policy against minority groups. Initial objections were raised through the associations in Germany. These associations established Coordination Committees aimed at advancing cooperation between the various associations. These efforts yielded fruit on 28 February 1988, when seven member associations co-founded the Federation of Western Thrace Turks in Germany.

These Turks thereby attained a larger sphere of representation, which gave a voice to the political, social, cultural, educational and other problems of the minority in the international arena. In 1996, when the UK association joined the rest, the Federation of Western Thrace Turks in Germany became the Federation of Western Thrace Turks in Europe.

== Mission ==
ABTTF aims for a solution to the problems of the Turkish Minority of Western Thrace in Greece and supports an inclusive minority policy, non-discrimination and recognition of fundamental rights and freedoms. ABTTF is independent of political parties, state authorities and governments.

The Federation seeks to raise the awareness of politicians and representatives throughout Europe about human rights violations in Western Thrace. ABTTF tries to induce Greece to cease violations and reminds the signatory states of the Treaty of Lausanne to comply with the obligations laid out in the treaty's stipulations.

== International recognition ==
In 2006, ABTTF was accredited as a non-governmental organization (NGO) by the United Nations. On May 10, 2006, the UN Committee on Non-governmental Organizations recommended the United Nations Economic and Social Council (ECOSOC) grant consultative status to ABTTF and 21 other NGOs, which led to ABTTF's accreditation in July 2006. This status allows the organization to participate in international meetings of the UN as a speaker and to set up a representative office at the UN's main sites in New York, Vienna and Geneva.

Furthermore, ABTTF is a full member of the Federal Union of European Nationalities (FUEN). In 2008, ABTTF was a founding party of Fundamental Rights Platform (FRP) of the European Union Agency for Fundamental Rights (FRA). In 2008 ABTTF became an active member of the European Dialogue Forum, which is the committee that contacts the European Parliament regarding issues concerning traditional national minorities, constitutional regions and regional languages. Moreover, ABTTF participates in conferences of the Organization for Security and Co-operation in Europe (OSCE) and of FUEN. In April 2005, the organization took part in the Parliamentary Assembly of the Council of Europe.

== Organization ==
The Federation is structured in five main units: General Assembly, Executive Board, Audit Board, Disciplinary Board and Board of Representatives.

The General Assembly is the highest decision-making body. Delegates of the member associations, ABTTF Executive Board and natural persons are members of ABTTF General Assembly.

The executive board is composed of 11 members, including President, two vice-presidents, General Secretary, one accountant and six members in accordance with Article 26 of the German Civil Law. The Board s is elected by the General Assembly for a term of two years. Members of the executive board cannot assume duty in other organs, except their ipso facto membership to the Board of Representatives. Besides general managerial tasks, the executive board is liable for the execution of decisions taken by Board of Representatives and General Assembly as well as ABTTF's recruitment policy. The President of the Federation has the competence of representing the organization alone, whereas two vice-presidents bear the right to representation together with General Secretary and Accountant. Staff may not serve on the executive board.

The Audit Board is composed of three members and is elected by the ABTTF General Assembly, which is held every two years. The Audit Board inspects decisions and accounts of the Federation at least annually. The mid-term reports prepared following an audit are submitted to the Board of Representatives and executive board. The general audit report prepared at the end of term is presented at the General Assembly.

The Disciplinary Board is composed of three members and is elected at the ABTTF General Assembly. Board members cannot serve in other organizational bodies of ABTTF, and they cannot be board members of any member association.

The Board of Representatives is the highest decision-making body among other organizational entities. It is formed by two board members from each member association and ABTTF Executive Board. The Board of Representatives convenes at least once each year and with a presence of 1/4 of its members has the right to make decision on any matter, except those made at the level of executive board.

== Works and international cooperation ==
ABTTF has advocated on behalf of the Minority at the European Parliament (EP), Parliamentary Assembly of the Council of Europe (PACE), Organization for Security and Co-operation in Europe OSCE and the UN.

The organization's progressive approach, especially since 2002, has broadened ABTTF's involvement with international minority representatives. The organization has been a full member of FUEN since 2008. ABTTF President Halit Habip Oğlu to was elected to the FUEN Board in 2013.

ABTFF is a regular participant at the OSCE Human Dimension Implementation Meeting; the Supplementary Human Implementation Meetings; at the UN Forum on Minority Issues; and the Human Rights Council organised by the Office of the High Commissioner for Human Rights (OHCHR). ABTTF cooperates with Brussels-based civil society organisations. The fact-finding mission to the region in October 2012 was held in presence of FUEN President Hans-Heinrich Hansen, Member of the European Parliament François Alfonsi and Human Rights Without Frontiers Int’l (HRWF) Director Willy Fautre. The report Ethnic Turks in Greece, a Muslim Minority regarding human rights violations, based on the testimonies of the Minority, was drafted by HRWF Director Willy Fautre.

In March 2013, ABTTF, the Party of Friendship, Equality and Peace (FEP, Minority's political party), and the Culture and Education Foundation of Western Thrace Minority (CEFOM) organised a visit to the region with participation of FUEN President Hans-Heinrich Hansen and European Association of Daily Newspapers in Minority and Regional Languages (MIDAS) board member Bojan Brezigar. The delegation attended the trial of minority publications Gundem and Millet as observers at Thrace Court of Appeal on 22 March 2013. Further, to the support to the Minority media, FUEN President and MIDAS board members visited FEP and held consultations with the Minority members.

In June 2013, The “One million signatures for diversity in Europe” campaign was introduced, within the framework of European Citizens Initiative to the EC by FUEN and has been presented to Turkish Minority of Western Thrace through a mission organised by ABTTF and FEP to the Thracian cities of Komotini and Xanthi. In support of the Turkish Minority of Western Thrace FUEN Director Jan Diedrichsen, Democratic Union of Hungarians in Romania (RDMSz) Vice-president László Borbély and RDMSz International Secretary Lorant Vincze joined the visit.

Beyond the international engagement, entrusted with coordination of member associations for maintaining the social and cultural values of the Western Thrace Turks, ATTBF is the founding member of the Permanent Secretariat of International Council of Western Thrace Turks, an upper entity established for synchronization and cooperation of works among organizations created by the West Thracian Turkish diaspora.

== See also ==
- Turks of Western Thrace
- 1990 Komotini events
