= Csilla Hegedüs =

Romanian politician (born 1967)

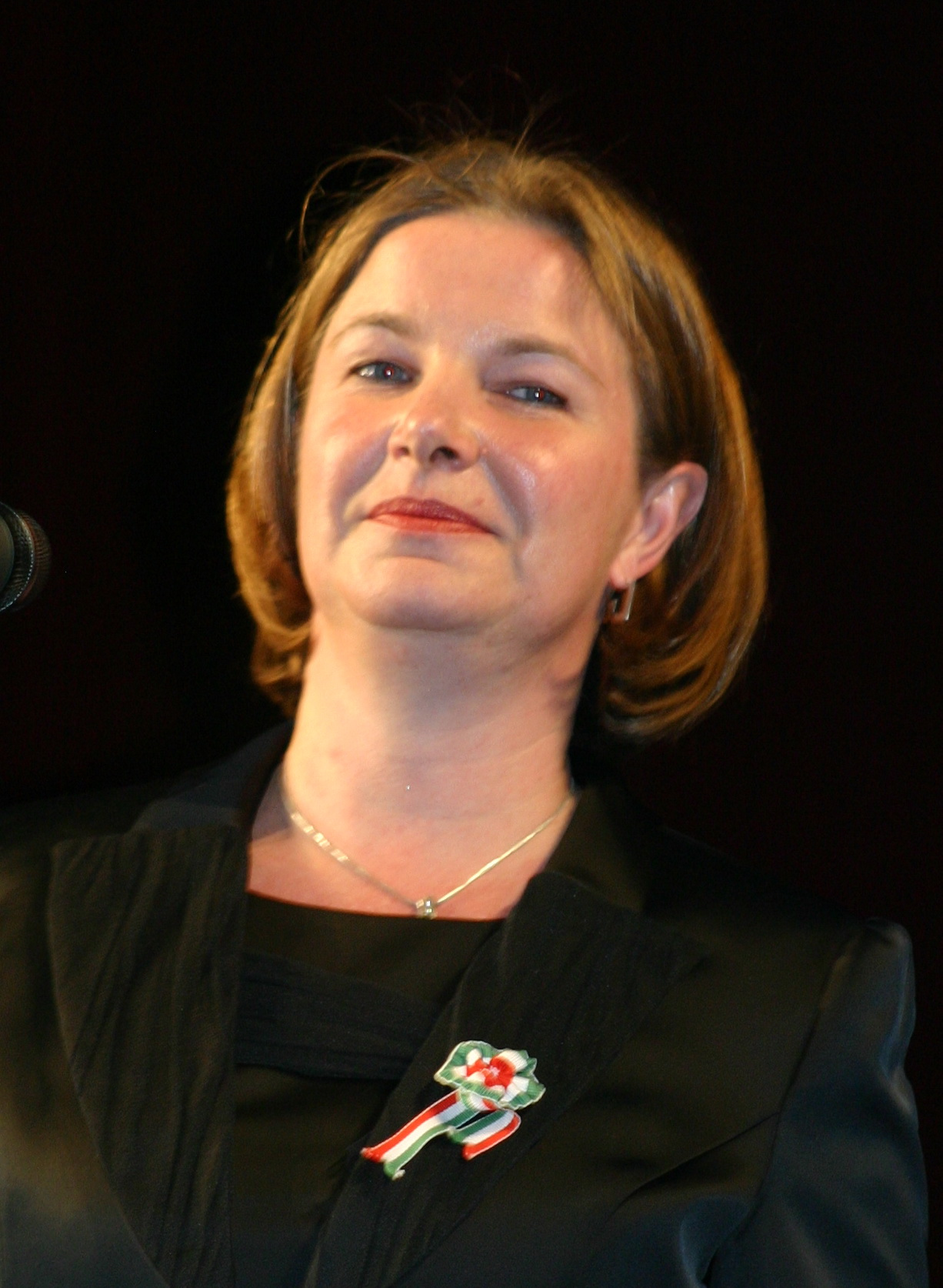
- Hegedüs in 2015 while serving as Culture Minister (photo by László Horváth)

Deputy Prime Minister of Romania
- In office 24 November 2014 – 13 December 2014
- President: Traian Băsescu
- Prime Minister: Victor Ponta
- Preceded by: Hunor Kelemen
- Succeeded by: Vasile Dîncu

Minister of Culture
- In office 24 November 2014 – 13 December 2014
- President: Traian Băsescu
- Prime Minister: Victor Ponta
- Preceded by: Hunor Kelemen
- Succeeded by: Ionuț Vulpescu

Personal details
- Born: 9 September 1967 (age 58) Cluj, Romania
- Website: hegeduscsilla.ro

Csilla Hegedüs (born 9 September 1967) is a Romanian politician and member of the Democratic Alliance of Hungarians in Romania (UDMR) who served as Minister of Culture and Deputy Prime Minister in the Victor Ponta cabinet from November to December 2014. She was also State Secretary within the same ministry from March to November 2014.

In 1997, Hegedüs graduated with an economics degree from Babeș-Bolyai University; she had undertaken studies in tourism and business management at Dimitrie Cantemir Christian University. She also has a degree in adult education from the University of Pécs, which she attained in 2009. From 1997 to March 2014, she headed the Transylvania Trust Foundation, meant to preserve buildings in Transylvania. Subsequently, she became a state secretary at the Culture Ministry in March 2014, and was promoted to minister that November. She left her cabinet positions the following month when her party quit the government.
