= Corina Șuteu =

Romanian politician

Romanian Minister of Culture
- In office 4 May 2016 – 4 January 2017
- President: Klaus Iohannis
- Prime Minister: Dacian Cioloș
- Preceded by: Vlad Alexandrescu
- Succeeded by: Ioan Vulpescu

Personal details
- Born: Bucharest
- Education: University of Bucharest
- Occupation: Consultant, manager

Corina Șuteu is an international cultural consultant. She served as Culture Minister of Romania from May 2016 to January 2017 in the technocrat government. She earlier served as State Secretary within the Ministry of Culture in the cabinet of Dacian Cioloș. from February to April 2016.

== Early life ==
In 1983, she graduated from the University of Bucharest's literature faculty, specializing in Romanian and English, which she taught for the next four years at a Făgăraș high school.

== Career ==
From 1987 to 1989, she edited Teatrul magazine.

She became interested in managing cultural organizations after the fall of communism. At the beginning of the 1990s she was the director of the Theatre Union of Romania (UNITER) and of Theatrum Mundi in Bucharest. From 1991 to 1993, she directed the Theatre Union of Romania. From 1993 to 1995, she directed Bucharest's Theatrum Mundi.

In France, she was for nine years the director of the European master's degree in Cultural management of the Business School in Dijon. In 1995, she initiated the first regional training program in cultural management for Eastern European professionals, the ECUMEST program. From 1995 to 2001, she headed the cultural management master's program at Business School of Dijon. From 2002 to 2005, at the University of Nantes' Institut de l'Homme et de la Technologie, she coordinated the cultural management department.

From 2006 to 2012 she was Director of the Romanian Cultural Institute in New York, the Romanian public agency dedicated to cultural diplomacy and international arts exchange, initiating and implementing the new vision on cultural diplomacy promoted by RCI. Under her leadership, RCI New York forged a space for intercultural dialogue, connecting Romanian arts and artists to the evolving international scene.

She is the initiator and president of the Romanian Film Festival in New York since 2006. She held the presidency of the network of European Cultural Institutes in NYC (EUNIC) in 2010.

From 2012 to 2016, she was a freelance trainer, consultant and researcher. She worked in the fields of cultural cooperation and cultural management and policies with leading organizations throughout Europe.

She is author of Another brick in the wall. A critical review of cultural management education in Europe (Boekman Foundation, Amsterdam, 2006) and of numerous articles and studies.
