= Ioan Vulpescu =

Romanian politician (born 1976)

Minister of Culture
- In office 4 January 2017 – 29 June 2017
- President: Klaus Iohannis
- Prime Minister: Sorin Grindeanu
- Preceded by: Corina Șuteu
- Succeeded by: Lucian Romașcanu
- In office 17 December 2014 – 17 November 2015
- President: Klaus Iohannis
- Prime Minister: Victor Ponta
- Preceded by: Csilla Hegedüs
- Succeeded by: Vlad Alexandrescu

Member of the Senate of Romania
- Incumbent
- Assumed office 20 December 2016
- Constituency: Bucharest

Member of the Chamber of Deputies
- Incumbent
- Assumed office 19 December 2012 – 19 December 2016

Personal details
- Born: 17 June 1976 (age 50) Marghita, Romania
- Party: Social Democratic Party
- Occupation: Politician

Ioan "Ionuț" Vulpescu (born 17 June 1976) is a Romanian politician. A member of the Chamber of Deputies for the Social Democratic Party (PSD) since 2012, he was the Minister of Culture in the Fourth Ponta Cabinet from 17 December 2014 to 17 November 2015 and has held the position again since 4 January 2017.

== Biography ==
=== Studies ===
Ionuț Vulpescu graduated from the faculty of Orthodox Theology at the University of Bucharest. He has a master's in Doctrine and Culture and a PhD in Philosophy from the same institution.

From 2000 to 2004, he serve as an expert at the Department of Culture - Religions of the Presidential Administration. Beginning in 2004, he became adviser to then-President of Romania Ion Iliescu. He was executive secretary of the PSD, in charge of political strategies.

Since the founding of the "Bucharest Club" in 2009, Vulpescu has been its vice president. The group was established in Iliescu's office for his close network of politicians and supporters, who lost power at a time of internal PSD divisions.

=== Politics ===
In September 2012, Vulpescu was appointed by Prime Minister Victor Ponta as a member of the Board of the Romanian Cultural Institute. He left that office 28 January 2013 after winning a Bucharest seat in the Romanian Chamber of Deputies at the 2012 legislative election. In the Chamber, he sits on the Committee for Culture, Arts and mass media, and has served as Minister of Culture starting from 4 January 2017.
