= Federal Union of European Nationalities =

Organization

The Federal Union of European Nationalities (FUEN) is an international non-governmental organization (NGO) established in 1949 in conjunction with the formation of the Council of Europe. FUEN is an umbrella organization, and as of 2023, it has more than 100 member organizations representing ethnic, linguistic and national minorities within Europe. FUEN has been instrumental in encouraging the Council of Europe to adopt the European Charter for Regional or Minority Languages and the Framework Convention for the Protection of National Minorities. FUEN was organized to give expression to European cultures and languages that do not possess form as a nation-state. One in seven Europeans are members of such minorities and fifty-three languages are spoken in Europe by such minorities.

Its predecessor was the pre-war European Congress of Nations (German: Europäischer Nationalitätenkongress) founded by Ewald Ammende. The Congress published a journal "Nation und Staat" (1927–1944).

FUEN organises the Europeada association football tournament. In 2017–2018, FUEN collected 1,124,322 signatures from EU citizens for the Minority SafePack European Citizens' Initiative.

It is based in Flensburg, Germany, with offices in Berlin and Brussels. Its president is Olivia Schubert a German from Hungary, who succeeded in 2025 Lóránt Vincze, a Hungarian from Romania and MEP.

== Member organizations ==
- Austria: Croatian Center for Culture, Education and Politics (2012), Croatian Cultural Association of Burgenland (1958), National Council of Carinthian Slovenes (1958), Community of the Carinthian Slovenes (2012)
- Albania: Montenegrin Community in Albania “ZCGA” - Elbasan (n.d.), Macedonian Association “Ilinden” – Tirana (2015)
- Azerbaijan: "Vatan" Public Union of Ahiska Turks living in Azerbaijan (n.d.)
- Belgium: ProDG (2014)
- Bosnia and Herzegovina: Otaharin - Citizens' Association for the Promotion of Education of Roma (2017)
- Bulgaria: Centre for Aromanian Language and Culture in Bulgaria (n.d.), European Institute - POMAK (n.d.)
- Switzerland: Lia Rumantscha (1954), Pro Grigioni Italiano (2009), The Radgenossenschaft der Landstrasse (2023), Schäft qwant - Trans-national association for Yenish cooperation and cultural exchange (2004)
- Czech Republic: Congress of the Poles in the Czech Republic (n.d.), Assembly of German Associations in the Czech Republic (1993)
- Germany: Federation of Western Thrace Turks in Europe (2007), Domowina (1990), EBLUL Germany - Committee for regional and minority language (2012), Frasche Rädj seksjoon nord (2022), Frisian Association (1949), South Schleswig Association (n.d.), Central Council of German Sinti and Roma (n.d.), Union of Poles in Germany (n.d.)
- Denmark: Federation of Germans in Northern Schleswig (n.d.), Danish Border Association (n.d.)
- Estonia: Estonian Union of National Minorities (2001), Association of Belarusians in Estonia (2004), Union of Germans in Estonia (1998), NGO "Russian School of Estonia" (2017), Union of Russian Educational and Charitable Societies in Estonia (2001)
- Spain: The Pro-Language Platform (2018)
- France: Occitania Football Association (2013), Committee for regional action in Brittany (1949), EL Association (n.d.), The Cultural Institute of Brittany (n.d.), Breton Party (2013), Unser Land (2022)
- Georgia: Association of Germans of Georgia “Einung” (2003), Public Movement Multinational Georgia (2002)
- Greece: Western Thrace Minority University Graduates Association (2007), Party of Friendship, Equality and Peace (2013), Ecumenical Federation of Constantinopolitans (2011), Panhellenic Pomak Association (2019), Rainbow-Macedonian minority party (2002), Macedonian Movement to Promote Mother Language “Krste Misirkov” (2022)
- Hungary: National Self-Government of Romanians in Hungary (2022), National Self-Government of Slovaks in Hungary (2004), Self-Government of Germans in Hungary (n.d.), National Self-Government of Rusyns in Hungary (2023)
- Croatia: German society - Organisation of Danube Swabians in Croatia, Osijek (2011), Democratic Union of Hungarians in Croatia (2002), Coordination of Councils and Representatives of the Czech National Minority (2011), Serb National Council (2000)
- Italy: Foundation "Agostina Piccoli" (2018), Institute for Studies on Local Administration (2013), Slovenska kulturno-gospodarska zveza SKGZ (2022), Union of the Slovenes in Italy (n.d.), Confederation of Slovene Organisations (2019), South Tyrolean People's Party in South Tyrol (1954), Union of the Ladins of Dolomites (1997), Friulian Philological Society (2023)
- Ireland: Údarás na Gaeltachta (2021)
- Kyrgyzstan: Council of Germans in Kirgistan (1998)
- Kazakhstan: The Community of Germans of Kazakhstan "Wiedergeburt" - Public Union (2019)
- Latvia: Association of Germans in Latvia (2009)
- Moldova: German House "Hoffnung" of the Republik of Moldova (2004)
- North Macedonia: Union for the Culture of the Aromanians in Macedonia (2002), Association for Human Right Protection of Roma – Stip (2018), Roma Democratic Development Association SONCE (2017), Roma Community Center “DROM” (2017)
- Netherlands: The Frisian Movement (1949)
- Poland: Kashubian–Pomeranian Association (1993), Masurian Society in Poland (1991), Association of German Social Cultural Societies in Poland (n.d.), Union of Lemkos (1996)
- Romania: Democratic Union of Slovaks and Czechs in Romania (2019), Democratic Forum of Germans in Romania (1993), Arman Community in Romania (2006), Hungarian Civic Party (2014), Democratic Alliance of Hungarians in Romania (1991), Tatar Democratic Union (2021)
- Serbia: Democratic Alliance of Croats in Vojvodina (1993), German People's Union (2002), Humanitarian Centre Rom Obrenovac (2017), Lunjina Serbian–Aromanian Association (2019), Alliance of Vojvodina Hungarians (2005), Humanitarian Society of German Minority "St. Gerhard" (2023)
- Russia: “IVDK”-International Union of German Culture (2004), International Society of Meskhetian Turks (1996), International Union of Greek Societies of CIS Pontos (2002), Bars El: Social Organisation for Fostering and Development of the Karachay-Balkar Traditions (2012), Federal Lezghin National and Cultural Autonomy (FLNCA) (n.d.), Qumuqlar (n.d.)
- Sweden: The Foundation Scanian Future (1991)
- Slovakia: Czech Association in Slovakia (1998), Carpathian-German association in Slovakia (1993), Aliancia–Szövetség (n.d.)
- Slovenia: Italian Union (2021), Association of German Speaking Cultural Societies in Slovenia (2016), The Hungarian Self-Governing Ethnic Community of Pomurje (2017)
- Turkey: Rhodes, Kos and the Dodacanese Turks Culture and Solidarity Association (2014)
- Ukraine: All-Ukrainian National Cultural Association of the Moldovians (2015), The Cultural Alliance of Hungarians in Sub-Carpathia (1993), Association of Crimean Karaites "Krymkarailar" (2003), Mejlis of the Crimean Tatar People (n.d.), Council of Germans in Ukraine (n.d.), Public Organization «Assembly of Nationalities of Ukraine» (2015), Society of the Carpatho-Rusyns in Ukraine (1999), Federation of Greek Communities of Ukraine (2016)
- Uzbekistan: Cultural Society of Germans in Uzbekistan "Wiedergeburt" (2002)

== See also ==
- Minority SafePack
- Unrepresented Nations and Peoples Organization
- European Centre for Minority Issues
- European Bureau for Lesser-Used Languages
