= Puiu Hașotti =

Romanian politician (born 1953)

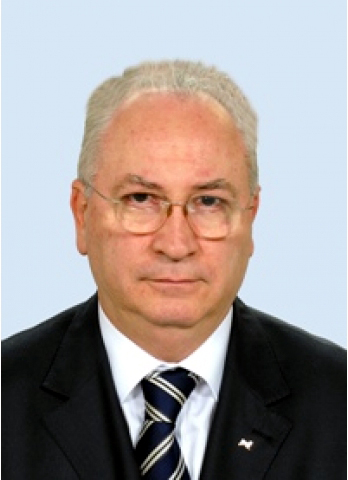

Member of the Chamber of Deputies
- In office 22 Nov 1996 – 10 Dec 2000; 11 Dec 2000 – 11 Dec 2004
- Constituency: no. 14 (Constanța)

Senator of Romania
- Incumbent
- Assumed office 13 Dec 2004 – 12 Dec 2008; 15 Dec 2008
- Constituency: no. 14 (Constanța)

Leader of the National Liberal Party group in the Senate
- Incumbent
- Assumed office 4 April 2007
- Constituency: no. 14 (Constanța)

Minister of Culture
- In office 25 June 2012 – 21 December 2012
- President: Traian Basescu
- Prime Minister: Victor Ponta
- Preceded by: Mircea Diaconu
- Succeeded by: Daniel Barbu

Personal details
- Born: 14 June 1953 (age 73)
- Party: National Liberal Party

Puiu Hașotti (Romanian pronunciation: [ˈpuju ˈhaʃoti]; born 14 June 1953) is a social conservative Romanian politician of Aromanian descent. He is a vice-president of the National Liberal Party (PNL) and the leader of the party's group in the Senate.

== Early life and education ==
Hașotti was born on 14 June 1953 in Constanța, Romania. He is an Aromanian. Hașotti graduated from the Faculty of History, University of Bucharest in 1976 and received his doctorate in historical sciences in 1995. The year before he was a Fulbright Fellow at San Francisco State University. Before entering politics, Hașotti worked as a curator, principal curator, and then senior researcher (between 1976 and 1996). He also was a counsellor at Constanța County Inspectorate for Culture (1990–1995), and a lecturer at Ovidius University of Constanța, Faculty of History (1990–1996). He later gained an associate professorship at this institution, which he still holds.

== Controversy ==
In April 2013, Hașotti incited controversy by declaring that he considers gay people to be "sick people". He also said that, "Homosexuality is not a normal state, it is not a natural relationship". The comments were made in the context of political debate about same-sex civil unions in Romania. Accept, Romania's national LGBT rights organisation, stated that they believed Hașotti's comments were a breach of anti-discrimination law and would report him to the National Council for Combating Discrimination.
