= Gabriel Andreescu =

Romanian human rights activist

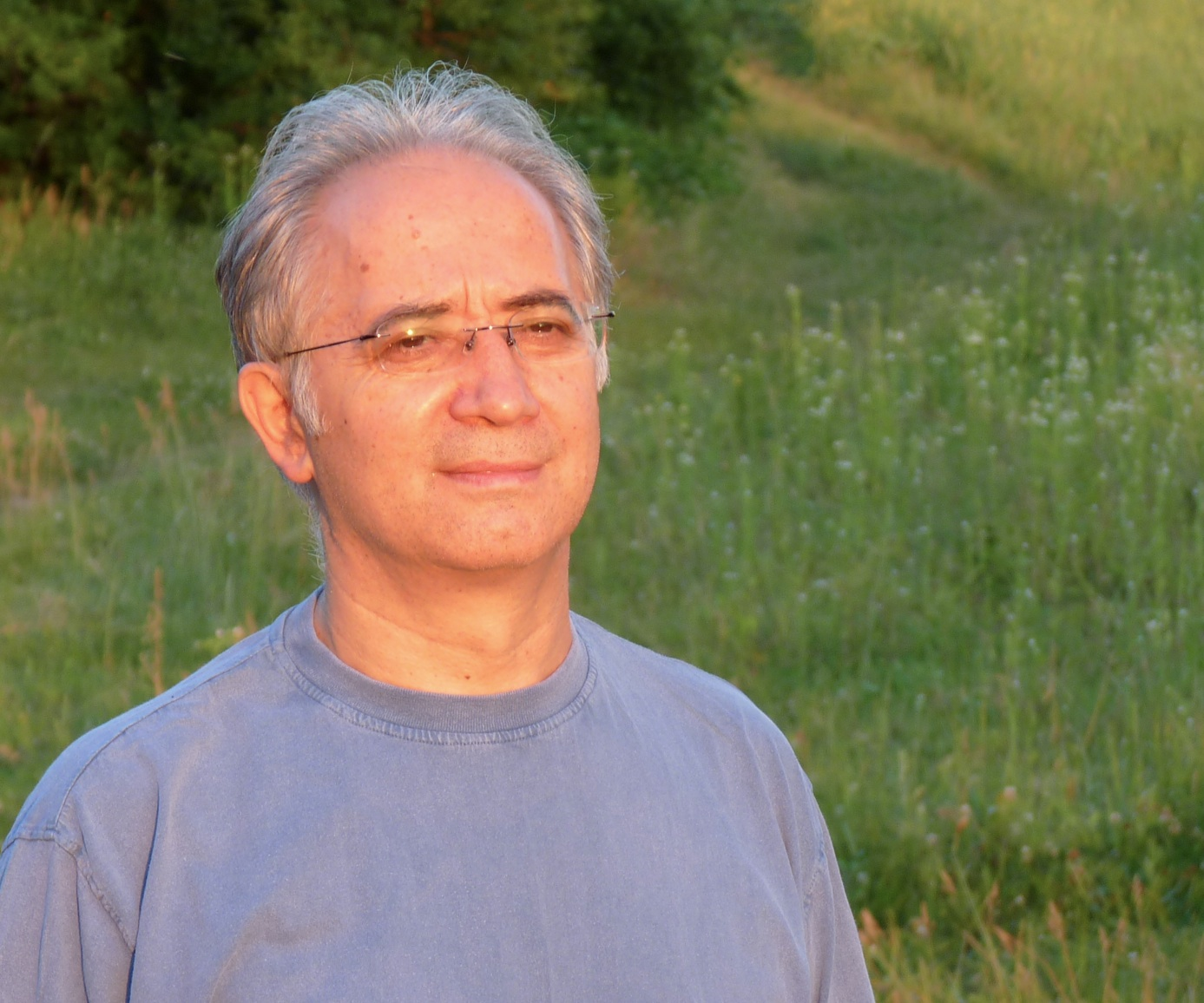
- Gabriel Andreescu in 2010
- Born: April 9, 1952 (age 74); Buzău, Romania
- Education: University of Bucharest
- Occupations: Human rights activist, political scientist

Gabriel Andreescu is a Romanian human rights activist and political scientist born on 8 April 1952 in Buzău. He is one of the few Romanian dissidents who openly opposed Nicolae Ceaușescu and the Communist regime in Romania.

At present, he is professor in the Department of Political Science at the National School for Political Studies and Public Administration (SNSPA) in Bucharest, and an active member of several Romanian human rights organizations. He is also a journalist, writing and lecturing on topics such as multiculturalism, national minorities, religious freedom, and secularism, the ethics and politics of memory and others. He is editor of the Romanian-language New Journal of Human Rights (Noua Revista de Drepturile Omului, formerly Revista Romana de Drepturile Omului).

== Biography ==
Andreescu attended the Bogdan Petriceicu Hasdeu High School in his hometown, then obtained a BA in Physics from the University of Bucharest. He taught high school physics (1976–1980), then moved to Bucharest where he worked as a researcher for the National Institute for Meteorology and Hydrology (1980–1989). During this period he published academic papers on linguistics, logics, and mathematical poetics among others.

After the December 1989 anti-Communist revolution, Andreescu abandoned his career as a physicist to continue his activism for human rights, democracy, and the rule of law. His work as a human rights activist, political analyst, journalist, and writer blended with academic teaching and research.

=== Dissidence under Communism ===
Between 1983 and 1987 Gabriel Andreescu dispatched clandestine information on human rights abuses in Romania to Radio Free Europe and wrote several anti-communist articles and studies, some of which he managed to send and publish abroad. He was investigated by the Securitate (the Romanian communist-era political police) starting with 1979. He was arrested for his anti-communist activities in December 1987 and indicted for treason (but freed in January 1988 as result of international protests, and put under surveillance till the fall of the Communist regime). Nevertheless, he continued to write and dispatch letters of protest to the Western media (1988–1989). Some of them (e.g., Lettre à la Conférence de Cracovie (1988) and Le devoir d'ingérence (1989)) were published in the Western press (L'Autre Europe and Libération). In June 1989 he went on a hunger strike as a protest against the continuous violation of human rights in Romania. He was demoted and placed by the Securitate under house arrest in Buzău, then again arrested, to be released after the revolution of December 1989.

=== Activity after December 1989 ===
After the anti-Communist revolution Andreescu became a member of the Council of the National Salvation Front, the first post-Communist governmental body after the revolution in 1989 (he soon resigned). He also initiated and was co-president of the Association for the Defense of Human Rights in Romania – the Romanian Helsinki Committee (APADOR-CH), where he also worked as expert on national minorities and freedom of conscience and religion. He co-founded and was president of the Group for Social Dialogue (GDS), as well as founding member and vice-president of the Civic Alliance (AC).

Gabriel Andreescu founded and headed other organizations developing strategies and projects in support of human rights, among them the Ombudspersons for National Minorities, the Center for International Studies, the Center of Inquiry-affiliated Center for Critical Conscience, and the Solidarity for Freedom of Conscience. He was a board member of several other organizations (Hungarian Europe Society, Ethnocultural Diversity Resource Center, Partnership for Equality, Open Society Foundation Expert Teams, Foundation for the Development of Civil Society), as well as a member of the scientific boards of other organizations.

Gabriel Andreescu also participated in international programs and research, including

Near neighborhood at the Eastern frontiers of the future European Union (The Centre for Policy Applied Research / Europe Team / Bonn)
Managing Multi-Ethnic Communities: Textbook for schools of public administration in Central and Eastern Europe (Local Government Initiative / Open Society Institute / Budapest)
Improving Hungarian-Romanian Relations (Teleki Foundation / Budapest & Center for International Studies / Bucharest)
International Mission of the Community of Democracies to Georgia
Community Action Programme to Combat Discrimination: Preparatory Work to Establish Transnational Actions for the Development of Policy and/or Legal Responses to the Fight Against Discrimination on Grounds of Racial or Ethnic Origin, Religion or Beliefs, Disability, Age, And Sexual Orientation (EU Commission – Directorate-General Employment and Social Affairs).

As a journalist and political analyst, he contributed to several Romanian newspapers and magazines (Ziua, Timpul, Observator cultural, Revista 22, Opinia, Altera, Cotidianul etc.); between 1994 and 2004 he wrote for Radio Free Europe.

== Awards ==
In recognition of his human rights activism and contribution to the development of Romanian civil society, Andreescu received several awards from Romanian institutions and organizations:

Award from the magazine "Contemporanul" (2015)
Award from the magazine "Observatorul Cultural" for his book "Cărturari, opozanți și documente. Manipularea Arhivei Securității" (2013)
"C. Rădulescu-Motru” Award, in recognition for the contribution to the field of cultural ideology (2012)
Prize of the National Council for Combating Discrimination (2007)
Prize of the Civic Alliance of Roma from Romania (2006 and 2007)
Pro Minoritate (Diaspora Foundation, Timişoara, 2003)
National Order "Star of Romania”, knight (Presidency of Romania, President Emil Constantinescu, 2000)
First Prize for the study "A Romanian Conception of Federal Europe", co-authored with Adrian Severin (Open Society Foundation, 2000)
The Third Millennium Prize (Partida Romilor, 1999)
Pro Amicitia (Association of Magyar Journalists in Romania, 1994 and 1998)

International awards

JSRI Award (Field: Religion and Politics, 2012)
Petofi Sandor Award (21st Century Institute, Budapest, 2009)
European Journalist (Delegation of the Commission of the European Union, 1996)
Pro Minoritate (from the Hungarian Government, 1995)
Human Rights Monitor Award (Human Rights Watch, 1990)

== Publications ==
Gabriel Andreescu published more than 1000 articles, 150 studies, 28 books, and contributed to several collective volumes. Some of his works were translated into English, German, Italian, Spanish and Hungarian.

=== Books ===
- Existenţa prin cultură. Represiune, colaboraţionism şi rezistenţă intelectuală sub regimul communist, Polirom, Iaşi, 2015
- MISA. Radiografia unei represiuni, Polirom, Iași, 2013
- Cărturari, opozanți și documente. Manipularea Arhivei Securității, Polirom, Iași, 2013
- L-am urât pe Ceaușescu. Ani, oameni, dissidență, Polirom, Iaşi, 2009
- Reprimarea mişcării yoga în anii '80, Polirom, Iaşi, 2008
- Schimbări ale hărţii etnice a României, Centrul pentru Diversitate Etnoculturală, Cluj, 2005
- Naţiuni și minorităţi, Polirom, Iași, 2004
- Extremismul de dreapta în România / Right-Wing Extremism in Romania, Centrul pentru Diversitate Etnoculturală, Cluj 2003 [Romanian and English]
- Pages from the Romanian-Hungarian Reconciliation: 1989–1999. The Role of Civic Organizations, Institute of International Education, Washington, 2001
- Polemici neortodoxe, Noesis, Bucharest, 2001
- Ruleta. Români și maghiari, 1990–2000, Polirom, Iaşi, 2001
- Locurile unde se construiește Europa. Adrian Severin în Dialog cu Gabriel Andreescu, Polirom, Iaşi, 2000
- Solidaritatea alergătorilor de cursã lungã, Polirom, Iaşi, 1998
- Patru ani de Revoluție, Litera, Bucureşţi, 1994
- Cel mai iubit dintre ambasadori. Coen Stork în dialog cu Gabriel Andreescu, All, București, 1993
- Spre o filozofie a dissidenței, Litera, București, 1992
- Sistemele axiomatice ale logicii limbajului natural. Funcții și operaționalizare, All, București, 1992

=== Co-authored volumes ===
- Comentarii la Constituția României, Polirom, Iaşi, 2010
- Accesul la informaţie în România / Access to Information in Romania, Centrul pentru Drepturile Omului, Bucharest, 1996 [Romanian and English]
- Evoluţia concepţiei U.D.M.R. privind drepturile minoritãţii maghiare, Centrul pentru Drepturile Omului / Evolutions in the D.AH.R. Conception on Hungarian Minority Rights, Bucharest, 1995 [Romanian and English]
- Concepţia U.D.M.R. privind drepturile minoritãţilor naţionale / Study on the Conception of D.A.H.R. on the Rights of National Minorities, Centrul pentru Drepturile Omului, Bucharest, 1994 [Romanian and English]

=== Edited volumes ===
- (co-editor) Doctrina internaţională a tratării trecutului communist, C.H. Beck, București, 2016
- (co-editor) Ultimul deceniu communist. Scrisori către radio Europa liberă. Vol. II.1986-1989, Polirom, Iaşi, 2014
- (co-editor) Ultimul deceniu communist. Scrisori către radio Europa liberă. Vol. I.1979-1985, Polirom, Iaşi, 2010 (L`ultimo decennio comunista, Ed. Pavesiana, 2014)
- Tătarii din România: teme identitare / Tartars in Romania: Problems of Identity, Center for Human Rights, Bucharest, 2005 [Romanian and English]
- (co-editor) Problema transilvană, Polirom, Iaşi, 1999
- Naționaliști, antinaționaliști. O polemicã în publicistica româneascã, Polirom, Iași, 1996
- România versus România, Clavis, București, 1996

=== Selected articles in books ===
- "The emergence of a new radical right power: the Romanian Orthodox Church", in Michael Minkenberg (ed.), Transforming the Transformation? The East European Radical Right in the Political Process, Routledge, London, 2015
- "The Romanian State on State-Church Relations", in Natalia Vlas and Vasile Boari (eds.), Religion and Politics in the 21st Century: Global and Local Reflections, Cambridge Scholars Publishing, Newcastle, 2013, pp. 236–274
- "Passive / aggressive symbols in the public school: religious displays in the Council of Europe and the United States, with a special focus on Romania" in Jeroen Temperman, The Lautsi Papers: Multidisciplinary Reflections on Religious Symbols in the Public School Classroom, Martinus Nijhoff Publishers, Hotei, 2012, pp. 267–299.
- "Multiculturalismul", în Mihaela Miroiu (coord.), Ideologii politice actuale. Semnificații, evoluții și impact, Polirom, Iași, 2012, pp. 261–304.
- "Melodrama forului. Documentele Securității despre identitatea și rezistența intelectualilor", Vasile Boari, Natalia Vlas, Radu Murea (coord.), Intelectualii și puterea, Institutul European, Iași, 2012, pp. 167–209.
- "Douăzeci de ani de democrație anarhică", în Vasile Boari, Natalia Vas, Radu Murea (coord.), România după douăzeci de ani, Institutul European, Iași, 2011.
- "20 de ani de războaie culturale. Victoria junk-conservatorismului", in Sorin Adam Matei, Mona Momescu (eds.), Idolii forului. De ce o clasă de mjloc a spiritului e de preferat "elitei" intelectualilor publici?, Corint, București, 2010
- "The Paradox of National Identity: Its Cultural-Political Power vs. Its Theoretical Poverty", in Vasile Boari and Sergiu Gherghina (eds.), Weighting Differences: Romanian Identity in the Wider European Context, Cambridge Scholars Publishing, Newcastle, 2009
- "Ellenzéki lét Romániában", in Dimenziók Éve (eds.), 1968, XX. Század Intézet, Budapest, 2008
- "Campaniile de presă: cum ajung adversarii la consens", in Ilie Rad (ed.), Forme ale manipulării prin presă, Tribuna, Cluj-Napoca, 2008
- "Raportul: ansamblul şi detaliile", in Vasile Ernu, Costi Rogozanu, Ciprian Şiulea, Ovidiu Ţichindelean (eds.), Iluzia anticomunismului. Lecturi critice ale Raportului Tismăneanu, Cartier, Chişinău, 2008
- "A Functional Approach. Collective and Individual Rights", in Stanisław Parzymies, OSCE and Minorities. Assessment and Prospects, Wydawnictwo Naukowe Scholar, Warsaw, 2007
- "Romania", in Cas Mudde (ed.) Racist Extremism in Central and Eastern Europe, Routledge, London and New York, 2005
- "Necesitatea şi detaliile unei legi privind regimul cultelor şi libertatea de conştiinţă", in Sandu Frunză (ed.) Paşi spre integare. Religie şi drepturile omului în România, Limes, Cluj, 2004
- "A múltfeldolgozás modelljei", ("Access to the Securitate archives in Romania") in Gábor Halmai (ed.), Űgynőkők és akták, SOROS Alopétráy, Budapest, 2003
- “Multiculturalismul normativ”, in Rudolf Polenda, François Ruegg, Călin Rus (eds.), Interculturalitate. Cercetări şi perspective româneşti, Presa Universitară Clujeană, Cluj, 2002
- “Paths of Secularisation in Eastern Europe: The Church-State Dispute in Romania“, in T.Lipovatz, N. Demertzis, V. Georgiadou (eds.), Religions and Politics in the Age of Modernity, Kritiki, Athens, 2002
- “Universal Thought, Eastern Facts: Scrutinizing National Minority Rights in Romania”, in Will Kymlicka, Magda Opalski (eds.), Can Liberal Pluralism be Exported? Western Political Theory and Ethnic Relations in Eastern Europe, Oxford University Press, New York, 2001
- “Un concept românesc al Europei Federale“, in Un concept al viitorului Uniunii Europene, Polirom, Iaşi, 2001
- “Die Beziehungen zu Moldova und Ukraine aus der Perspektive einer zukunftigen Schengen-Grenze“, in Iris Kempe, Wim van Meurs, Barbara von Ow (eds.), Die EU-Beitrittsstaaten und ihre ostlichen Nachbarn, Bertelsmann Stiftung, 1999
