= Bogdan Petriceicu Hasdeu National College =

- Colegiul Național "Bogdan Petriceicu Hasdeu"
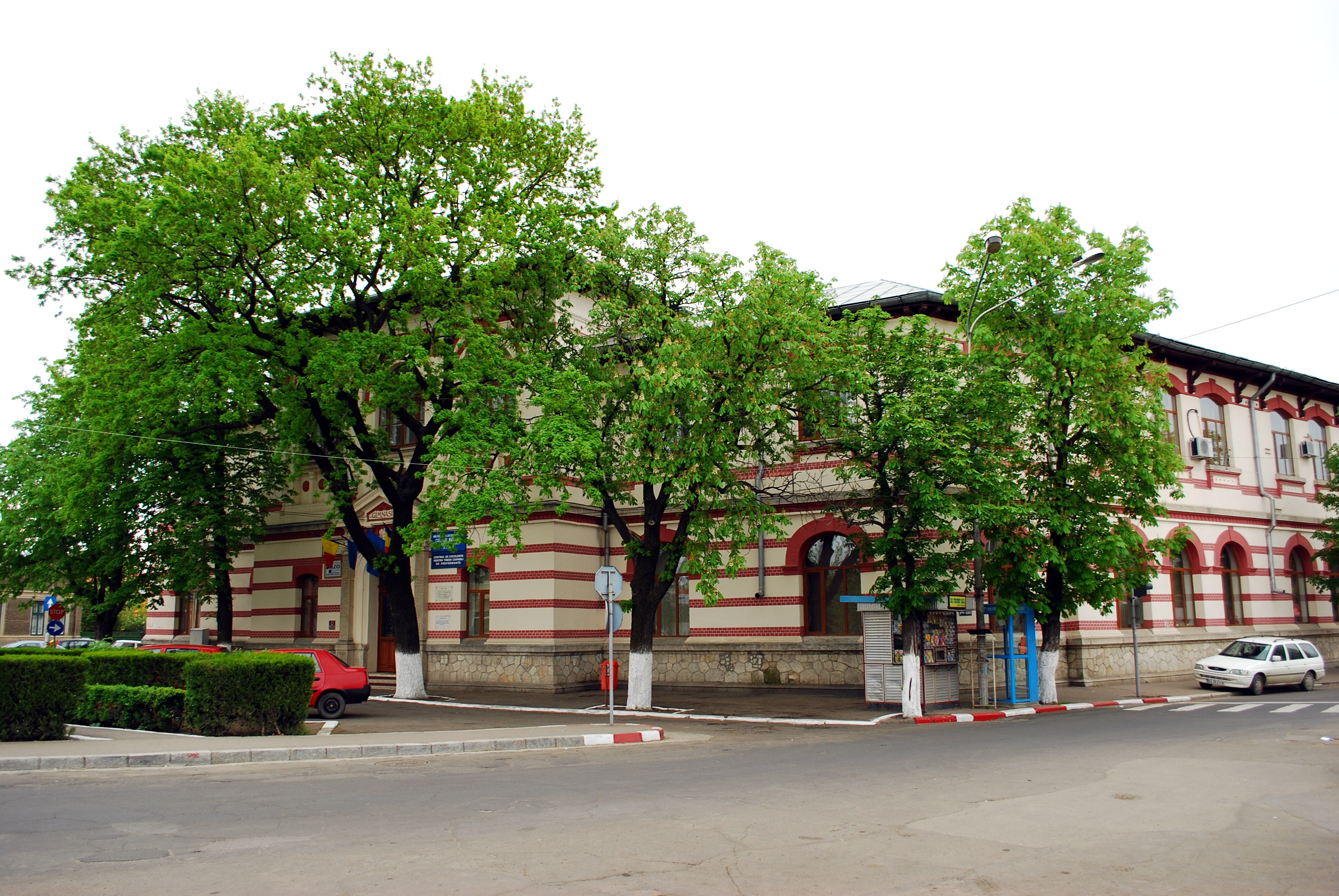

Location
- Bulevardul Gării, Nr. 1 Buzău, Buzău County; Romania
- Coordinates: 45°8′54″N 26°49′32″E

Information
- Funding type: Public
- Established: 1867
- Status: Open
- Category: Middle School and High School
- Grades: 5 to 12
- Gender: coeducation
- Age range: 11–19
- Enrolment: c. 1500
- Average class size: 28
- Language: Romanian
- Hours in school day: 5–7
- Campus type: Urban
- Website: bphasdeu.ro

The Bogdan Petriceicu Hasdeu National College (Romanian: Colegiul Național "Bogdan Petriceicu Hasdeu") is a high school located at 1 Gării Boulevard, Buzău, Romania. It was named after the Romanian scholar and historian Bogdan Petriceicu Hasdeu. Founded in 1867, it is the oldest state-funded high-school in Buzău.

Bogdan Petriceicu Hasdeu is a “theoretical” (as opposed to vocational) high school, with students ranging between grades 9 and 12, but it also has a small number of middle school classes. There are approximately 1,500 students aged between 11 and 19 years old. At the 2024 evaluation of all Romanian secondary schools, the high school came in 1st place, with a score of 9.58/10.

== History ==
=== The opening and the first year (1867–1868) ===
The law of public instruction, issued in November 1864, during the reign of Alexandru Ioan Cuza in Romania, ruled that in the country's major cities state-funded secular high and secondary schools were to be open. In 1865, the government organized schools in several cities, leaving out Buzău, however. This decision was motivated by a lack of funds, and by the fact that in Buzău there was already a secondary school functioning, the Theological Seminar. That school was not, however, secular, and the citizen's pressure persuaded the mayor to open a secondary school in 1867.

The school was funded by the municipality. It functioned on the premises of the city primary school and its first headmaster was Luca Pavlovici Călăceanu. Upon the headmaster's request for a curriculum, the Ministry of Public Instruction sent him the curriculum taught at the Saint Sava National College in Bucharest. The new public secondary school was attended by 11 students, all in the junior grade.

=== Trade school (1868–1869) ===
As the school was once again denied ministry funding in the early spring of 1868, the second year of the school's existence was also financed by the municipality. The new school year was open in September with 14 new students, all in the junior grade. By November, as the teachers were not receiving wages, conflicts arose between them and the mayor. Therefore, the municipality decided to teach a trade-school curricula. As the curricula had a high degree of difficulty, several students dropped out.

=== Sciences school (1869–1870) ===
The trade school project failed and the mayor decided to reorganize the school again in 1869. A curricula was requested from the ministry again in order to help recruiting teachers, and a science-school curricula, for two grades, similar to the one that was to be taught in the science school from Alexandria was received. The city decided, however, to teach the same secondary school curricula. During this year, the school had three teachers and no headmaster, being managed directly by the mayor.

The school was in a poor state by 1870, so the education inspector from Ploiești, Ioan Eliade, recommended that the school be appointed a provisional headmaster and that a final decision be made on the type of school and the curricula that should be taught.

=== The "Tudor Vladimirescu" Secondary School (1870–1894) ===
In 1870, Nae Stănescu, the mayor of Buzău, decided that the school should be a classic secondary school, with a corresponding curricula, and asked that Basil Iorgulescu and Ioan Rășcan, the two main teachers at the school be granted tenure, without further examination. The school was named The Tudor Vladimirescu Secondary School, and Basil Iorgulescu became its headmaster. It functioned with around 50 students in two grades (junior and senior) each year until 1875.

In 1873, Costache Ciochinescu, a 1848 revolutionary from Buzău, donated his personal library made up of 557 books, 4 paintings, and a map of Romania to the Vladimirescu secondary school. In 1879, the school was close to being closed, as the minister of education wanted to open a crafts school in Buzău. The municipality decided to close the secondary school, but, due to teachers' opposition, the school was maintained. Finally, in 1884, the government decided to take over the school's funding, relieving the local municipality. In the same year, trade sciences were removed from the curricula, where they had been kept by the local council. This change occurred in order to harmonize the curricula with other state-funded schools.

A new building was constructed between 1889 and 1890, on a piece of land formerly belonging to the Banului monastery. Also in 1890, the Ministry of Education suggested the school's patron be changed, and headmaster Basil Iorgulescu proposed that the school be named after Bogdan Petriceicu Hasdeu. However, Hasdeu refused the honor, and suggested that the school be named after his father instead. Thus, the Tudor Vladimirescu was renamed "The Alexandru Hâjdeu Secondary School". By 1891, the number of students studying there was over 200.

=== High school (1894–present) ===
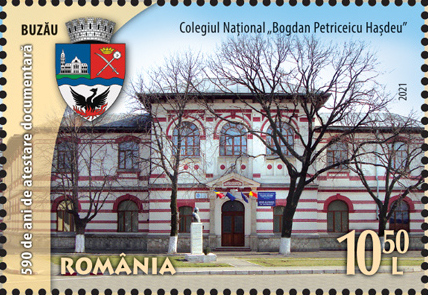
The college on a 2021 stamp of Romania

In 1893, the Ministry issued an order to approve the opening of the first high-school class at the Al. Hâjdeu school, which happened in 1894. The first high-school class graduated in 1897. Basil Iorgulescu resigned as headmaster in 1901, due to poor health, and died three years later.

During World War I, the high school was closed and the building was used by the army as a military hospital. As Buzău was occupied by German forces, the Romanian Army evacuated the city on 26 November 1916. Five days later, the German Army reached Buzău and also decided to use Hasdeu as a hospital, as well as stable for horses. On 11 February 1918, before the end of the German occupation, the Hasdeu reopened in a different building, provided by the mayor and shared with the Theological Seminar and the Şcoala Normală. Eventually, on 1 November 1918, as the war was almost over, the German Army allowed the school to use its own building for classes. The war damaged the buildings heavily, and many valuable items, as well as 20% of the books in the library were lost at the time. Headmaster Nazarie assessed the losses to 1.8 million lei.

By 1923, the school had over 1000 students registered and the classes were organized in two shifts. Additional land was purchased in order to build a dorm. Although the high-school had to downsize during the Great Depression, in 1932, the school changed its patron to Bogdan Petriceicu Hasdeu, as it had initially been the school's request. At the ceremony, a bust of Hasdeu, sculpted by Oscar Han was unveiled in front of the main building.

During World War II. classes continued, but the dorm was requisitioned by the Romanian Army. After the war, the school became 100% state-funded, as tuition was forbidden by the communist government. In 1953, the school was renamed Middle School no. 1, Buzău, losing the right to hold the name of its patron, Bogdan Petriceicu Hasdeu, until 1958. Also, primary and secondary school classes were organized along with the high school ones.

In 1965, it was renamed B.P. Hasdeu High School, and the primary school classes were terminated. However, secondary school classes were kept. The school received the title of National College (title given to the best Romanian high-schools) in 1996.

== Notable teachers ==
- Ion Andreescu
- Constantin Giurescu

== Notable alumni ==
- Gabriel Andreescu
- Ion Caraion
- Ștefan Gușă
- Nicolae Leonard
- George Emil Palade
- Valeriu Pantazi
- Constantin Ion Parhon
- Cătălin Predoiu
- Lucian Romașcanu
- Elena Udrea
