= Daniel Barbu =

Romanian political scientist (1957–2024)

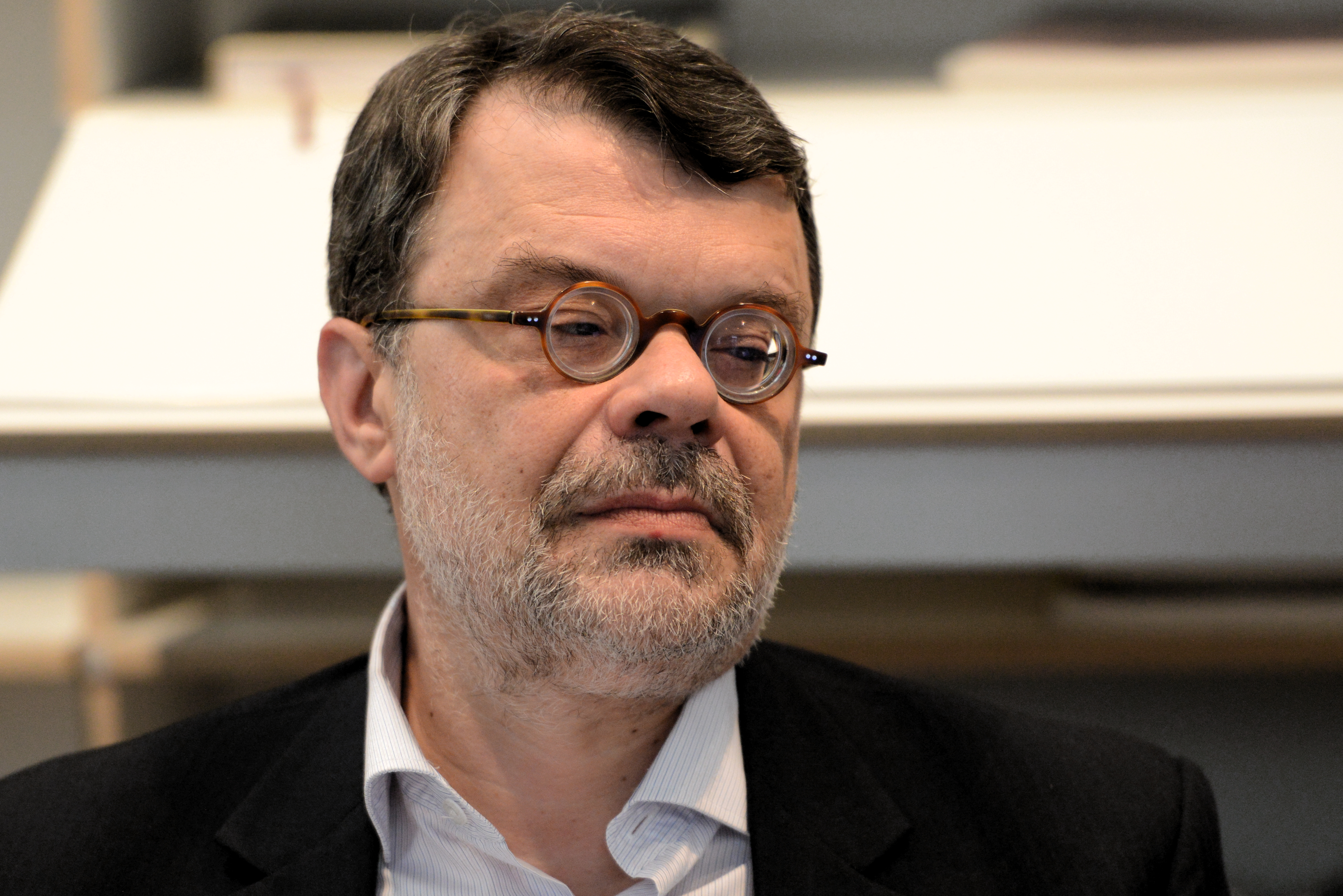
- Barbu in 2014

Minister of Culture
- In office 21 December 2012 – 12 December 2013
- President: Traian Băsescu
- Prime Minister: Victor Ponta
- Preceded by: Puiu Hașotti
- Succeeded by: Gigel Știrbu

Member of the Senate of Romania
- In office 19 December 2012 – December 2016
- Constituency: 42-Bucharest, Electoral district no. 5

Personal details
- Born: 21 May 1957 Bucharest, Romanian People's Republic
- Died: 18 March 2024 (aged 66)
- Resting place: Bellu Cemetery, Bucharest
- Party: Alliance of Liberals and Democrats (ALDE)
- Education: Bucharest National University of Arts; Babeș-Bolyai University; University of Bucharest
- Profession: Political scientist, publisher, essayist, journalist and professor
- Website: danielbarbu.eu

Daniel-Constantin Barbu (21 May 1957 – 18 March 2024) was a Romanian political scientist, publisher, essayist, journalist, and professor of political science at the University of Bucharest. He served as dean of the Faculty of Political Science and director of the Institute for Political Research at the University of Bucharest. He was the author as of June 2007 of eight books and many more articles on political science, and a contributor to the magazine Sfera Politicii.

He was also a member of the Romanian Senate from Bucharest (2012–2016) and from December 2012 to December 2013 Romania's Minister of Culture in Victor Ponta's second cabinet. From 2017 to 2019 he served as President of Romania's Permanent Electoral Authority.

== Early years ==
Barbu was born in Bucharest, and graduated from the Nicolae Bălcescu High School (the present-day Saint Sava National College) in 1976. At that time, the Union of Communist Youth, official youth organization in Communist Romania, refused to grant him permission to attend either the Faculty of History-Philosophy or that of Law. Consequently, Barbu attended art history at the Bucharest Fine Arts Institute, graduating in 1980. He then was employed as a curator at the Village Museum in Bucharest (1980) and the National History Museum of Romania (1981–1986).

== Academic career ==
Between 1987 and 1998, Barbu was a research fellow at the University of Bucharest's Institute of South-Eastern European Studies, that became an institute of the Romanian Academy in 1990. After the Romanian Revolution of 1989, he completed his Ph.D. in art history at the University of Cluj-Napoca in 1991, his thesis was on Artistic relations between Romanian countries and the Veneto-Cretan school in the 16th century. Between 1990 and 1991, he was head of Editura Meridiane, a Bucharest-based publishing house. He was also general director of Realitatea Românească, a daily newspaper, in 1991–1992. He then went to Switzerland, where he took doctoral studies in Catholic theology at the University of Fribourg until 1993. He was also a guest researcher at the Pontifical Oriental Institute in Rome. In the same year, he was appointed associate professor (Conferențiar universitar) at the University of Bucharest.

Barbu was the Dean of the Faculty of Political Science (and Public Administration) of the University of Bucharest from 1994 to 2000 and from 2002 to 2004. In 1997 he was promoted to a full professorship. In 1999, he took a second doctorate, in philosophy, from the University of Bucharest, and received the habilitation (Abilitare) in political science. In the same year, he took over as director of the Institute for Political Research of the University of Bucharest, a position he held until 2011. From 2004 to 2010, he chaired the Department of political science and from 2004 to 2011 he served as director of the university's Graduate school of political science. He was appointed to the scientific board of the Institute for the Investigation of Communist Crimes and the Memory of the Romanian Exile in 2014. In the following year, Barbu earned a third doctorate, in theology, from the University of Bucharest.

Barbu was a visiting professor at the School for Advanced Studies in the Social Sciences (EHESS) in Paris (1995), the National and Kapodistrian University of Athens (2000), University of Pittsburgh (2001), Jackson State University (2002), Institut d'études politiques de Bordeaux (2004), Central European University in Budapest (2005), and Sciences Po Aix (2009).

Barbu specialised in the comparative history of European civilizations, political science and comparative political science, social and political models of the state, minorities and confessional groups in Romania, constitutions, government and politics in Europe, totalitarian regimes, communism and state-socialism, and political anthropology.

== Politics ==
Barbu worked as a state adviser for President Emil Constantinescu between 1997 and 1999.

In 2004, the European Anti-fraud Office (OLAF) notified the Romanian Government about irregularities found in a Phare program headed by Barbu, as Dean of the Faculty of Political Science. The event was reported by an article on the BBC Romanian service on 5 May and appeared in the Daily Bulletin of the Romanian Ministry of Foreign Affairs a day later. According to both sources, the program engulfed over 200,000 euros coming from PHARE TEMPUS grant money into civil servant training courses which never took place and which had nonexistent people enrolled. In an interview during the 2012 parliamentary election campaign, as candidate from the Social-Liberal Union, Daniel Barbu dubbed the event as a misunderstanding and a "no penal matter".

A member of the National Liberal Party (PNL), Barbu was elected to the Romanian Senate, representing Bucharest's 5th electoral district at the December 2012 election. After the election, Prime Minister Victor Ponta designated Barbu as the Romanian Minister of Culture. It was Ponta who had in 2004 headed the government's control department which investigated the OLAF notifications. In December 2013, Barbu claimed that the funding allocated to the national program for the prevention and treatment of HIV/AIDS was too high compared to the amount allocated to the ministry of culture's programs. He suggested that by abolishing or halving the funds for the AIDS prevention program, the Craiova Shakespeare Festival could be expanded or more festivals could be organized. The National Council for Combating Discrimination launched an inquiry and Crin Antonescu, leader of PNL and President of the Senate, demanded Barbu's resignation, which he submitted on 12 December 2013.

From 2017 to 2019 Barbu served as President of Romania's Permanent Electoral Authority. He resigned from that position in order to run for the 2019 European Parliament election on the Alliance of Liberals and Democrats's (ALDE) list. With 4.1 percent of the votes, the party failed to win any seats.

== Death ==
Barbu died on 18 March 2024, at the age of 66. His funeral mass was held at the Roman Catholic Saint Joseph Cathedral and he was buried at Bellu Catholic Cemetery.

== Latest works ==
- Politica pentru barbari [Politics for the Barbarians], Nemira, Bucharest, 2005.
- Republica absentă. Politică și societate în România postcomunistă [The Absent Republic. Politics and Society in Post-Communist Romania], 2nd edition (revisited), Nemira, Bucharest, 2004.
  - Die abwesende Republik [The Absent Republic], Frank & Timme, Berlin, 2009.
- Bizanț contra Bizanț. Explorări în cultura politică românească [Byzantium contra Byzantium. Exploring Romanian political culture], Nemira, Bucharest, 2001 (1st ed. 1999).
- O arheologie constituțională românească. Studii şi documente [A Romanian constitutional archeology. Studies and documents], Editura Universităţii din București, București, 2000.
- Byzance, Rome et les Roumains. Essais sur la production politique de la foi au Moyen Âge [Byzantium, Rome, and the Romanians. Essays on the political production of faith in the Middle Ages], Éditions Babel, Bucarest, 1998.
- Șapte teme de politică românească [Seven Themes of Romanian Politics], Antet, Bucharest, 1997.
- Au cetățenii suflet? O teologie politică a societăților post-seculare, Editura Vremea, București, 2016.

== Sources ==
- (in Romanian) Profile at the University of Bucharest site. Retrieved 5 July 2007
- (in Romanian) Profile at the Faculty of Political Sciences (University of Bucharest)
