= Ministry of Culture (Romania) =

Government ministry of Romania

- Incumbent; Ioana Ciocan since 20 October 2026
- First holder: Andrei Pleșu
- Website: www.cultura.ro

The Ministry of Culture of Romania (Romanian: Ministerul Culturii) is one of the ministries of the Government of Romania. The current position holder is András István Demeter from the Democratic Alliance of Hungarians in Romania (UDMR/RMDSZ).

The Romanian National Institute of Historical Monuments, part of this ministry, maintains the list of historical monuments in Romania. The list, created in 2004–2005, contains historical monuments entered in the National Cultural Heritage of Romania.

== List of Culture Ministers ==
| Portrait | Name | Term of office | | Party | Prime Minister |
|---|---|---|---|---|---|
| | Andrei Pleșu | 26 December 1989 | 16 October 1991 | Independent | Petre Roman |
| | Ludovic Spiess | 16 October 1991 | 19 November 1992 | Independent | Theodor Stolojan |
| | Marin Sorescu | 19 November 1992 | 11 December 1996 | Independent | Nicolae Văcăroiu |
| | Ion Caramitru | 12 December 1996 | 28 December 2000 | PNȚCD | Victor Ciorbea; Radu Vasile; Mugur Isărescu |
| | Răzvan Theodorescu | 28 December 2000 | 21 December 2004 | PSD | Adrian Năstase |
| | Mona Muscă | 29 December 2004 | 22 August 2005 | PNL | Călin Popescu-Tăriceanu |
| | Adrian Iorgulescu | 22 August 2005 | 22 December 2008 | PNL | Călin Popescu-Tăriceanu |
| | Theodor Paleologu | 22 December 2008 | 23 December 2009 | PDL | Emil Boc |
| | Hunor Kelemen | 23 December 2009 | 7 May 2012 | UDMR/RMDSZ | Emil Boc; Mihai Răzvan Ungureanu |
| | Mircea Diaconu | 7 May 2012 | 25 June 2012 | PNL | Victor Ponta |
| | Puiu Hașotti | 25 June 2012 | 21 December 2012 | PNL | Victor Ponta |
| | Daniel Barbu | 21 December 2012 | 12 December 2013 | PNL | Victor Ponta |
| | Gigel Știrbu | 12 December 2013 | 5 March 2014 | PNL | Victor Ponta |
| | Hunor Kelemen | 5 March 2014 | 24 November 2014 | UDMR/RMDSZ | Victor Ponta |
| | Csilla Hegedüs | 24 November 2014 | 13 December 2014 | UDMR/RMDSZ | Victor Ponta |
| | Ioan Vulpescu | 17 December 2014 | 17 November 2015 | PSD | Victor Ponta |
| | Vlad Alexandrescu | 17 November 2015 | 3 May 2016 | Independent | Dacian Cioloș |
| | Corina Șuteu | 4 May 2016 | 4 January 2017 | Independent | Dacian Cioloș |
| | Ioan Vulpescu | 4 January 2017 | 29 June 2017 | PSD | Sorin Grindeanu |
| | Lucian Romașcanu | 29 June 2017 | 16 January 2018 | PSD | Mihai Tudose |
| | George Ivașcu | 29 January 2018 | 4 November 2019 | Independent | Viorica Dăncilă |
| | Bogdan Gheorghiu | 4 November 2019 | 25 November 2021 | PNL | Ludovic Orban; Florin Cîțu |
| | Lucian Romașcanu | 25 November 2021 | 15 June 2023 | PSD | Nicolae Ciucă |
| | Raluca Turcan | 15 June 2023 | 23 December 2024 | PNL | Marcel Ciolacu |
| | Natalia-Elena Intotero | 23 December 2024 | 23 June 2025 | PSD | Marcel Ciolacu |
| | András István Demeter | 23 June 2025 | 20 October 2026 | UDMR/RMDSZ | Ilie Bolojan |
| | Ioana Ciocan | 20 October 2026 | Incumbent | Independent | Luca Niculescu |

== See also ==
- Culture of Romania
- List of historical monuments in Romania
