= Hunor Kelemen =

Romanian politician (born 1967)

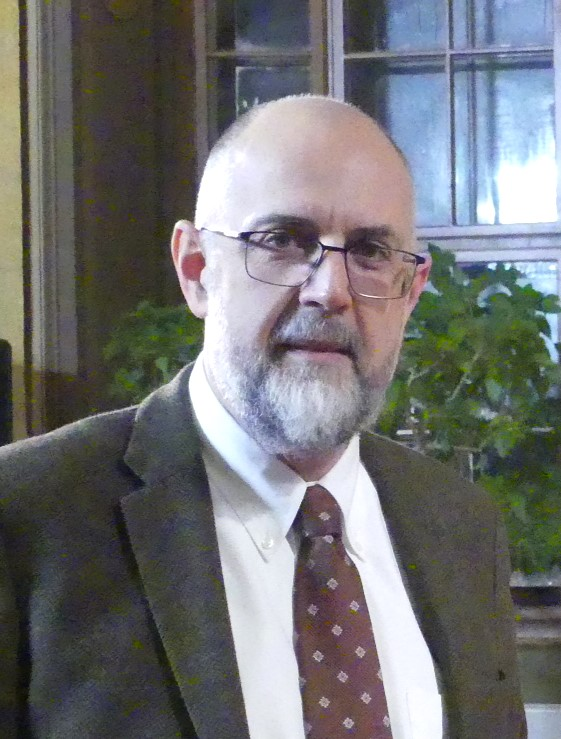
- Kelemen in 2023

Deputy Prime Minister of Romania
- In office 23 December 2020 – 15 June 2023 Serving with Sorin Grindeanu^{[a]}
- President: Klaus Iohannis
- Prime Minister: Florin Cîțu; Nicolae Ciucă
- Preceded by: Raluca Turcan
- In office 5 March 2014 – 24 November 2014
- President: Traian Băsescu
- Prime Minister: Victor Ponta
- Preceded by: Daniel Constantin
- Succeeded by: Csilla Hegedüs

Minister of Culture
- In office 23 December 2009 – 7 May 2012
- Prime Minister: Emil Boc; Mihai Răzvan Ungureanu
- Preceded by: Theodor Paleologu
- Succeeded by: Mircea Diaconu
- In office 5 March 2014 – 24 November 2014
- Prime Minister: Victor Ponta
- Preceded by: Gigel Știrbu
- Succeeded by: Csilla Hegedüs

Member of the Chamber of Deputies
- Incumbent
- Assumed office December 2000
- Constituency: Harghita County

President of the Democratic Alliance of Hungarians in Romania
- Incumbent
- Assumed office February 2011
- Preceded by: Béla Markó

Personal details
- Born: 18 October 1967 (age 59) Cârța, Romania
- Party: Democratic Alliance of Hungarians in Romania (since 1997)
- Spouse: Éva Czézár (m. 2012)
- Children: 2
- Education: University of Agricultural Sciences and Veterinary Medicine of Cluj-Napoca; Babeș-Bolyai University
- Profession: Veterinarian; philosophy teacher
- Website: www.kelemenhunor.ro
- a. With Dan Barna before 7 September 2021.

Hunor Kelemen (Note: Romanian pronunciation: [ˈhunor ˈkelemen]; Hungarian pronunciation: [ˈhunor ˈkɛlɛmɛn]) (born 18 October 1967) is a Romanian politician and Hungarian-language writer. The current president of the Democratic Alliance of Hungarians in Romania (UDMR), he has been a member of the Romanian Chamber of Deputies since 2000, and was nominated as his party's candidate for the 2009, 2014, 2019 and 2024 presidential elections. From December 2009 to May 2012 he was Romania's Minister of Culture in the Emil Boc and Mihai Răzvan Ungureanu governments, a role he has reprised between March and October 2014 in the government headed by Victor Ponta. In 2020, he was re-elected as a member of parliament and became the deputy prime minister of Romania.

In 2000, Hunor Kelemen was awarded the Order of the Star of Romania, Commander rank, and in 2008 Hungary's Commander's Cross of the Order of Merit. In 2012, he married Éva Czézár; the civil ceremony took place at Cârța Town Hall, while the religious wedding was held at St. Michael's Church in Cluj-Napoca.

== Biography ==
An ethnic Hungarian, he was born in Cârța, Harghita. He completed primary school in Ineu-Ciuc (the other village of the Cârța commune), and the gymnasium in his native locality, while practising ice hockey in the school's team. After completing high school in Târgu Mureș, he enrolled in the University of Agricultural Sciences and Veterinary Medicine of Cluj-Napoca, graduating as a veterinarian in 1993, and then in the Faculty of Philosophy of the Babeș-Bolyai University, graduating in 1998.

Following the Revolutions of 1989, Hunor Kelemen was one of the founders of the Hungarian language cultural magazines Jelenlét and later became deputy editor in chief. After 1993 he also collaborated with the Hungarian language magazine Korunk, and between 1990 and 1997 he was editor of cultural and political shows for the Radio Cluj, part of the Romanian Radio Broadcasting Company. In 1995 Hunor Kelemen published his first poetry volume in Hungarian language, Mínuszévek, for which he was awarded the Debut Prize of the Writers' Union of Romania in 1996. He further published a novel, A madárijesztők halála ("The scarecrow's death"), in 1999, and a second poetry volume, A szigetlakó ("The islander"), in 2001, both in Hungarian language.

Kelemen entered politics in 1997, when he was appointed as Secretary of State from the UDMR in the Romanian government's Ministry of Culture. He held this post until 2000, when he was elected in the lower house of the Romanian Parliament on the UDMR list. He was re-elected in 2004 and in 2008, obtaining over 50% of the votes in his electoral college in the latter elections.

In June 2009, the UDMR Council of the Union Representatives voted Hunor Kelemen as candidate for the office of President of Romania in that year's November elections. On this occasion Kelemen declared his program will include a proposal for Hungarian ethnic autonomy, in a way "that would not upset the Romanian ethnics". In July, at a summer camp organised by the UDMR at Băile Tușnad, he acknowledged that, as a Hungarian ethnic, he had no chance to win, but he presented the motives that led to his candidature: the desire of the Hungarian community of Romania to have a candidate of its own, the need to fill the traditional Hungarian segment in Romanian politics, and the need to present the message of the Hungarian minority to the Romanian majority. He received 372,764 votes (3.83% of the ballot). He performed better in the regions with important Hungarian communities, winning a majority in the counties of Harghita (71.2%) and Covasna (52.8%), and the second place in Mureș and Satu Mare.

On 20 December 2009, Emil Boc, nominated as prime-minister by the re-elected Traian Băsescu, proposed Hunor Kelemen as the Minister of Culture in the PDL-UDMR coalition government. The proposal was met with strong protests by PDL vice-president Cezar Preda, who declared that his party made the "greatest political mistake of the last years". Following unofficial protests from the Patriarch of the Romanian Orthodox Church, the Religious Affairs, previously subordinated to the Ministry of Culture, were put under the direct control of the prime-minister. Reportedly, the Orthodox Church was dissatisfied with being subordinated to a minister of a different denomination. The cabinet was approved by the Parliament on 23 December 2009.

Kelemen left government in May 2012 when the Răzvan Ungureanu government lost a vote of confidence and was replaced by the one led by Victor Ponta.

Together with Hans Heinrich Hansen, Hunor Kelemen was behind the European Citizens' Initiative called Minority SafePack, which successfully collected more than 1,000,000 signatures in a year starting from 3 April 2017 in order to "improve the protection of persons belonging to national and linguistic minorities and strengthen cultural and linguistic diversity in the European Union".

== Electoral history ==
=== Presidential elections ===
Election	Affiliation	First round			Second round		
Election	Affiliation	Votes	Percentage	Position	Votes	Percentage	Position
2009	UDMR	372,761	3.83%	5th	not qualified		
2014	UDMR	329,727	3.47%	8th	not qualified		
2019	UDMR	357,014	3.87%	6th	not qualified		
2024	UDMR	416,353	4.50%	7th	not qualified		
