= Bogdan Gheorghiu =

Romanian politician

Minister of Culture
- In office 4 November 2019 – 25 November 2021
- Prime Minister: Florin Cîțu
- Preceded by: Valer-Daniel Breaz
- Succeeded by: Lucian Romașcanu

Personal details
- Born: July 1, 1975 (age 51) Fălticeni, Suceava County, Socialist Republic of Romania
- Party: National Liberal Party (PNL)

Bogdan Gheorghiu (born 1 July 1975 in Fălticeni) is a Romanian politician who has been serving as Minister of Culture in the Cîțu Cabinet, led by Prime Minister Florin Cîțu, as of 23 December 2020. He previously served in this position in the first and second cabinet led by Ludovic Orban. He is affiliated with the National Liberal Party (PNL).

On December 1, 2022, during the 17th session of the UNESCO Intergovernmental Committee for the Safeguarding of the Intangible Cultural Heritage, held in Rabat, Morocco, decisions were adopted regarding the inscription of both elements on the Representative List of the Intangible Cultural Heritage of Humanity.
