= Lucian Romașcanu =

Romanian politician

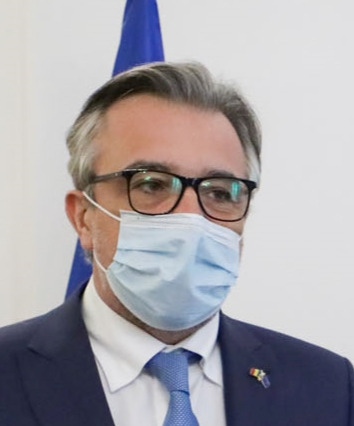
- Romașcanu in 2022

Member of the European Court of Auditors for Romania
- Incumbent
- Assumed office 1 July 2025
- President: Tony Murphy
- Preceded by: Viorel Ștefan

Minister of Culture
- In office 25 November 2021 – 15 June 2023
- Prime Minister: Nicolae Ciucă
- Preceded by: Bogdan Gheorghiu
- Succeeded by: Raluca Turcan
- In office 29 June 2017 – 29 January 2018
- Prime Minister: Mihai Tudose; Mihai Fifor (Note: As Acting Prime Minister.)
- Preceded by: Bogdan Gheorghiu
- Succeeded by: George Ivașcu

Spokesman of the Social Democratic Party
- Incumbent
- Assumed office 11 November 2021
- Leader: Marcel Ciolacu
- Preceded by: Ștefan-Radu Oprea
- In office April 2020 – 21 August 2020
- Leader: Marcel Ciolacu

Leader of the Social Democratic Party in the Senate
- In office 2020–2021
- Leader: Marcel Ciolacu

Member of the Senate for Buzău
- Incumbent
- Assumed office 20 December 2016

Personal details
- Born: 19 May 1967 (age 58) Focșani, Vrancea County, Romania
- Party: Social Democratic Party
- Children: 2
- Education: Bogdan Petriceicu Hasdeu National College
- Alma mater: Bucharest Academy of Economic Studies; University of Washington; ASEBUSS Bucharest (EMBA)

Lucian N. Romașcanu (born 19 May 1967) is a Romanian politician serving as Minister of Culture from 2021 to 2023. A member of the Social Democratic Party (PSD), he has been Senator for Buzău since 2016. He previously served as Culture Minister from 2017 to 2018.

Romașcanu was elected for Buzău at the 2016 legislative election. Following Mihai Tudose's appointment as Prime Minister, Romașcanu was appointed Minister of Culture. From January 2017, he served as Chairman of the Committee on Culture and Media of the Senate. In August 2020, after it was shown that he had sworn at journalists before a press conference, Romașcanu was dismissed as spokesman of the PSD.

Romașcanu served as Leader of the PSD in the Senate from 2020 to 2021. Under Nicolae Ciucă, Romașcanu was reinstated to his previous role of Minister of Culture.

== Early life ==
Romașcanu was born in Focșani, Vrancea County, Romania. He attended Bogdan Petriceicu Hasdeu National College, Buzău, graduating in 1985. He then attended the Faculty of Commerce at the Bucharest Academy of Economic Studies, graduating in 1991. He obtained an Executive MBA (EMBA) from the University of Washington and ASEBUSS Bucharest in 2002.

== Career ==
From 2015 to 2016, Romașcanu was acting country manager for technology company Tailwind.

Romașcanu served as leader of the Social Democratic Party in the Senate from 2020 to 2021.

On 25 November 2021 he was appointed Minister of Culture in the government of Nicolae Ciucă.

=== Dismissal as Spokesman of the Social Democratic Party ===
On 21 August 2020, it was revealed that Romașcanu had sworn at journalists before a press conference, after journalists had left the press conference room to attend a press conference with the Leader of the PSD, Marcel Ciolacu.

Later that day on 21 August, Romașcanu said that he regretted his use of language, and that his language was related to dissatisfaction about his colleagues who had left the PSD. Romașcanu was dismissed.

== Personal life ==
Romașcanu is married and has two children.
