= Minority SafePack =

Initiative on minority rights in the EU

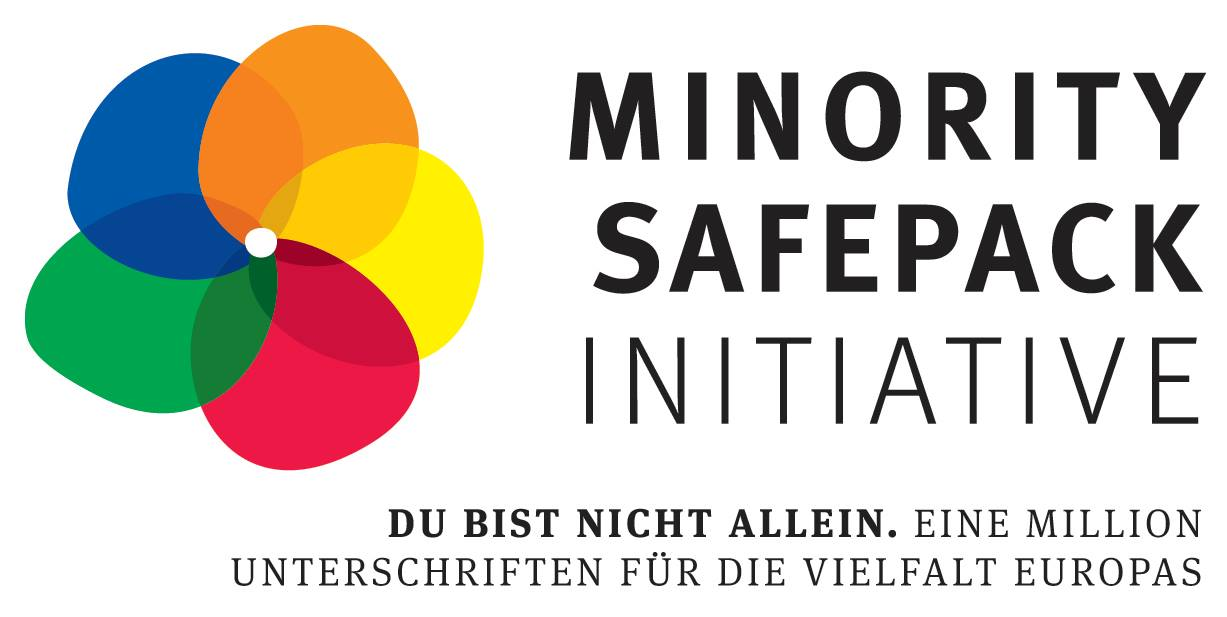
Logo of the initiative

Minority SafePack – one million signatures for diversity in Europe is an ongoing European Citizens' Initiative on minority rights in the EU, sponsored by FUEN.

== Content ==
The proposals registered by the European Commission were summarised as follows (by the initiators)

- EU Recommendation for the protection and promotion of cultural and linguistic diversity
- Funding programmes for small linguistic communities,
- The creation of a Language Diversity Centre
- The objectives of EU’s regional development funds to include the protection of national minorities and the promotion of cultural and linguistic diversity
- Research about the added value of minorities to our societies and Europe
- Approximating equality for stateless minorities e.g. Roma
- A single European copyright law, so that services and broadcast can be enjoyed in the mother tongue
- Freedom of service and reception of audio-visual content in the minority regions
- Block exemption of regional (state) support for minority culture, media and cultural heritage conservation.

The proposals rejected by the European Commission were:

- A Council directive, regulation or decision, for strengthening within the EU the place of citizens belonging to a national minority, with the aim of ensuring that their concerns are taken into consideration in the election of the European Parliament;
- Effective measures to address discrimination and to promote equal treatment, including for national minorities, in particular through a revision of the existing Council directives on the subject of equal treatment.

== Litigation ==
The European Commission initially refused to register the initiative, in 2013. The authors (who include Hunor Kelemen, Anke Spoorendonk, Karl-Heinz Lambertz, Luis Durnwalder and Valentin Inzko) have appealed the refusal in court, where they were joined by Hungary and the Commission - by Slovakia and Romania. The General Court annulled the Commission decision in February 2017. In March 2017, the Commission decided to launch collection of signatures for 9 of 11 proposals initially included in the initiative.

== Collection of signatures ==
Collection of signatures (both online and offline) began in April 2017, and continued until 3 April 2018.

The initiative has been supported by the Tyrol–South Tyrol–Trentino Euroregion, by the Basque Parliament and the Parliament of Navarre; an invitation to sign it was published at the web portal of the Parliament of the German-speaking Community of Belgium. As reported by FUEN, it has also been supported by the President of the European Parliament and the Hungarian Parliament.

As of 4 April 2018, the initiative has been supported online by 771,089 EU citizens (the unionwide threshold is 1,000,000). The necessary statewide threshold has been achieved by online signatures in nine member states (in Romania, Hungary, Latvia, Spain, Denmark, Slovakia, Lithuania, Croatia, and Slovenia), with seven having been needed.

Counting both online and offline signatures, the petition has been signed by 1,215,789 EU citizens. The threshold was reached in eleven countries, namely Romania, Hungary, Latvia, Spain, Denmark, Slovakia, Croatia, Lithuania, Slovenia, Bulgaria, and Italy. On 25 July, it was confirmed that over 1.1 million signatures have been recognised as valid.

== Consideration ==
The European Parliament has expressed support for the initiative in December 2020, as did the Bundestag in November. However no new legal acts have been proposed, the Commission refers to already existing policies that have been amended and will further support the goals of the initiative. It emphasises that diversity is ‘at the heart of the Union’ and one of the core principles the EU was founded on.
