= Democratic Union of Hungarians in Romania =

Romanian political party

Democratic Union of Hungarians in Romania Romániai Magyar Demokrata Szövetség Uniunea Democrată Maghiară din România
- President: Hunor Kelemen
- Leader in the Senate: Lóránd Turos
- Leader in the Chamber of Deputies: Botond Csoma
- Founded: 25 December 1989
- Headquarters: Bucharest (presidency); Cluj-Napoca (presidency and executive presidency)
- Ideology: Hungarian minority interests; Transylvanianism; Social conservatism; Christian democracy; Pro-Europeanism; Historical: Economic nationalism
- Political position: Centre-right
- National affiliation: National Coalition for Romania (2021–2023, 2024–2025); Romania Forward Electoral Alliance (2025)
- European affiliation: European People's Party
- European Parliament group: European People's Party Group
- International affiliation: Centrist Democrat International
- Senate: 10 / 135
- Chamber of Deputies: 21 / 330
- European Parliament: 2 / 33
- Mayors: 200 / 3,176
- County Presidents: 4 / 41
- County Councilors: 104 / 1,340
- Local Council Councilors: 2,526 / 39,900
- Ministers: 0 / 18

Party flag

Website
- udmr.ro

The Democratic Union of Hungarians in Romania (DUHR; Hungarian: Romániai Magyar Demokrata Szövetség, RMDSZ [ˈromaːnijɒji ˈmɒɟɒr ˈdɛmokrɒtɒ ˈsøvɛt͡ʃːeːɡ]; Romanian: Uniunea Democrată Maghiară din România, UDMR) is a political party in Romania which aims to represent the significant Hungarian minority of Romania.

Officially considering itself a federation of minority interests rather than a party, from the 1990 general elections onwards UDMR has had parliamentary representation in the Romanian Senate and Chamber of Deputies. From 1996 onwards, UDMR has been a junior coalition partner in several governments. It has been described as having close ties with Hungary’s right-wing, socially conservative Fidesz party and, implicitly, with former Prime Minister Viktor Orbán.

The party is a member of the European People's Party and Centrist Democrat International.

== History ==
The UDMR was founded on 25 December 1989, immediately after the fall of the Communist dictatorship in the Romanian Revolution of 1989 to represent in public the interests of the Hungarian community of Romania. Its first president was writer Géza Domokos during the early 1990s.

The UDMR obtained consistent results during the 1990, 1992, 1996, 2000, 2004, 2008, and the 2012 elections, gaining representation in both houses of the Parliament, yet until 1996 the UDMR acted in opposition. From 1996 onwards, the party governed in a coalition with the Romanian Democratic Convention (Romanian: Convenția Democrată Română) (CDR)—a wide centre-right alliance that won the elections that year—and obtained some positions in the government of Victor Ciorbea.

Four years later, the opposition party, the Social Democratic Party of Romania (PSD) won the 2000 elections. Although the UDMR did not join the new government as a coalition partner, it did sign a series of annual contracts with the PSD in which the PSD pledged to implement certain legal rights for the Hungarian minority community in return for UDMR's endorsement in parliament.

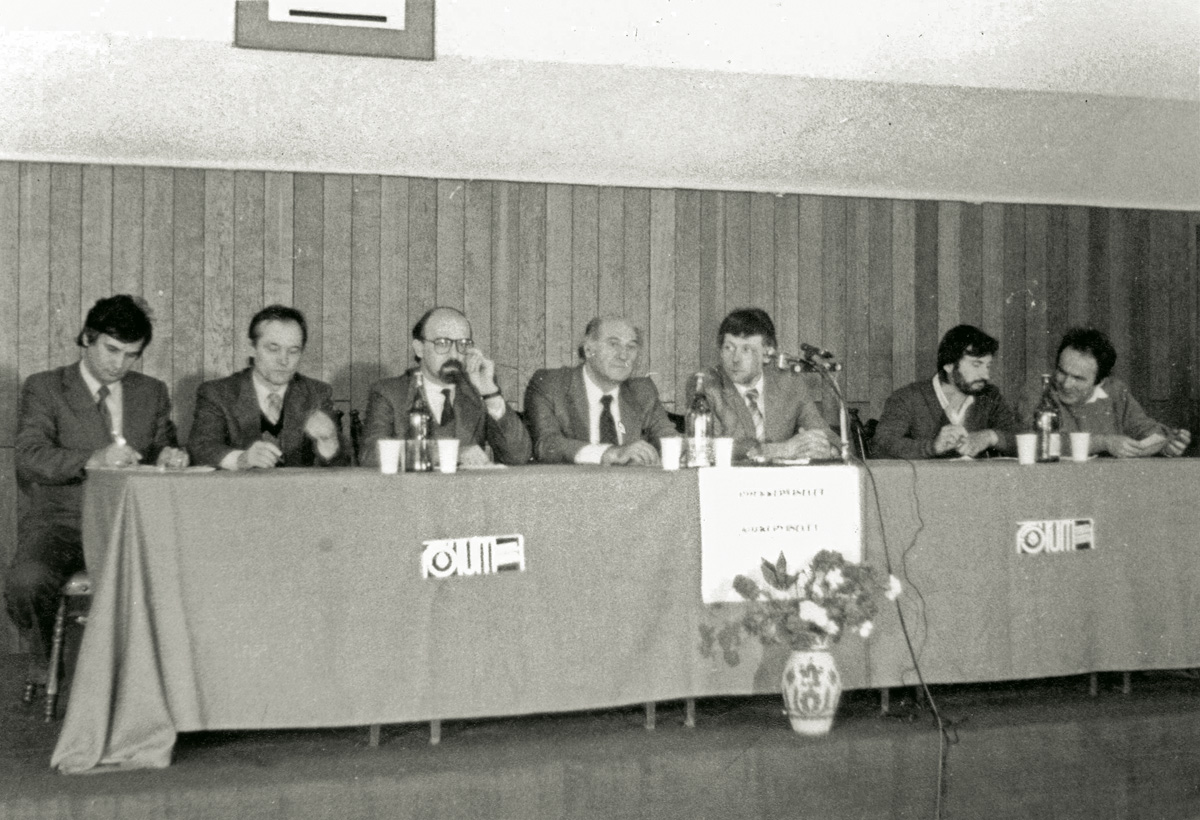
Former presidents of the UDMR Géza Domokos and Béla Markó at one of the first meetings after the founding of the organisation

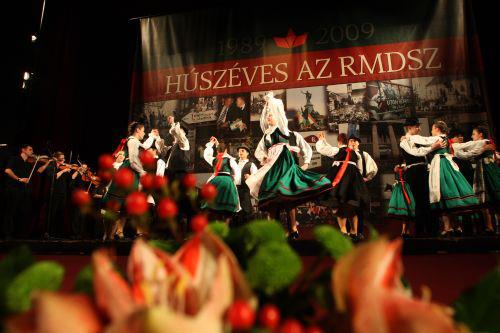
The UDMR celebrates 20 years since its establishment.

In the 2004 elections, the UDMR made an alliance to back Adrian Năstase of the Social Democratic Party, who was the favourite to win the presidential elections, but the surprise victory of Traian Băsescu rocked the Romanian political spectrum. After negotiations, the UDMR, together with the Romanian Humanist Party (later to become the Conservative Party), defected from the PSD alliance and pledged to form a coalition with the Justice and Truth Alliance (DA). The UDMR obtained positions in the government.

After the 2008 legislative elections UDMR entered in opposition. In 2009, after the adoption of a motion of no confidence against the Emil Boc's left and right grand coalition government, the UDMR became part of the new Emil Boc Cabinet, and continued after Emil Boc's resignation as junior coalition partner of the Mihai Răzvan Ungureanu Cabinet together with the PDL and UNPR. In 2012 the Romanian Parliament voted a motion of no confidence against the Ungureanu Cabinet. After the formation of the Social Liberal Union (USL) government led by Victor Ponta, the UDMR entered the opposition.

After the 2012 elections the same parties continued to form a government under the leadership of Victor Ponta. In 2014 the liberal part of the party coalition left the government, while the UDMR, PC, and UNPR joined the new government. The UDMR left the government in December 2014, shortly after the landslide victory of Klaus Iohannis as President of Romania. Subsequently, the UDMR provided mostly confidence and supply agreements to other ruling majorities before becoming part of a grand coalition after December, 2020. After the resignation of the Ciucă Cabinet, UDMR withdrew from the coalition, after the National Liberals decided to take the Minister of Development, Public Works and Administration, which was held by UDMR in the Ciucă Cabinet.

== Party organisation ==
=== Status ===
UDMR is not a legally registered political party, but takes part in elections under art. 4(2) of the Law 68/1992 which assimilates organizations representing national minorities to political parties from an electoral point of view. UDMR is an "alliance" of the ethnic Hungarian community in Romania, which incorporates several platforms of different ideologies, social, scientific, cultural or professional groups as associated organizations, youth and women organisations. The UDMR represents the Magyar (ethnic Hungarian) community of Romania (1,237,746 citizens, according to the 2011 census). Hungarians represent 18.9% of the total population of Transylvania; in Szeklerland (Harghita, Covasna and part of Mureș counties) they form the majority. The overwhelming majority (99%) of the Hungarian population of Romania lives in Transylvanian counties (Arad, Bistriţa-Năsăud, Bihor, Brașov, Alba, Harghita, Hunedoara, Cluj, Covasna, Caraș-Severin, Maramureș, Mureș, Satu Mare, Sibiu, Sălaj, Timiș). In national elections, the Alliance consistently obtains around 6% of the votes, which roughly corresponds to the percentage of ethnic Hungarian voters (6,5%).

=== Structure ===
The organization's president is Hunor Kelemen, elected at a party congress in 2011. Béla Markó, a writer, had held the position from 1993. He in turn was preceded by founding president Géza Domokos, in office from 1990 to 1993.

The UDMR is structured into 22 territorial organizations, covering all regions of Transylvania, the capital Bucharest, several counties outside Transylvania, as well as platforms representing different political ideologies (Christian Democratic, Socialist, Liberal, National Liberal). It has several associated partners and groups representing the civil society, or the social, scientific, artistic or professional domains. As decision-making bodies, the UDMR operates the Congress, the Council of Representatives, the Permanent Council and the Presidency. The executive presidency is the executive body of the alliance. The consulting bodies of the alliance are: the Consulting Council of Regional Presidents, the Consulting Council of Platforms and the National Council of Self-governments. The bodies credited with controlling are the Regulation Control Committee, the Ethics and Disciplinary Committee. In addition, the President regularly convenes other consultative bodies such as the Economic Council and the Foreign Council.

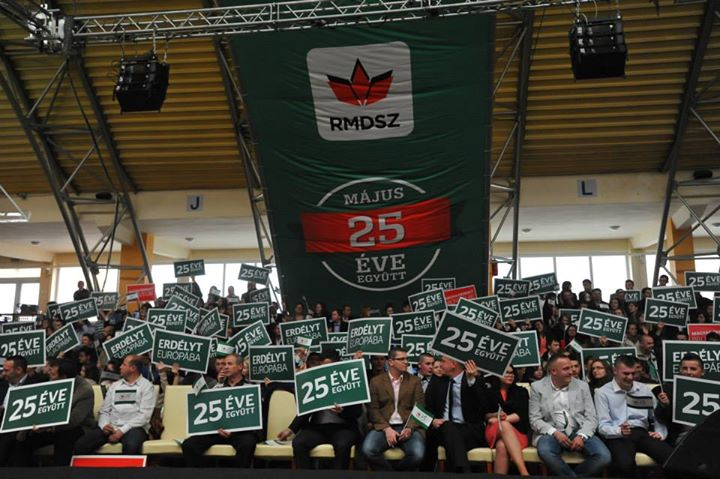
The UDMR celebrates 25 years since its establishment.

=== Doctrine ===
As an ethnic minority organization representing the Hungarians of Romania, the UDMR, above all, concerns itself with Hungarian minority rights, including cultural and territorial autonomy.

The most important objectives of the UDMR are the preservation and development of the Hungarian community in Transylvania, the achievement of the different types of autonomy: cultural autonomy for the smaller and most vulnerable communities and the territorial autonomy and self-determination for those living in large majority area. The use of the mother tongue in all segments of private and public life, the education in mother tongue, the administration of all establishments in the area of minority education and culture are the most important elements of the daily struggle of the UDMR.

The alliance has undertaken the task of representing the interests of the Hungarian community of Romania in Romanian and European politics as well. Ever since its establishment, the formation advocated for the necessity of a united political life, one single voice, that expresses the goals of the Hungarian minority in Romania. This is based on the principle that, as a minority, the Transylvanian Hungarian community should politically be represented by a single, united organization that would offer a framework for varied ideologies and not by various political parties. The UDMR seeks to establish equal to equal relations with Romanian and European political actors expecting their support in pursuing the goals of the Hungarian community. The UDMR is convinced the Hungarian community in Romania is the only entity entitled to make decisions concerning the Hungarian community in Romania.

The UDMR focuses on cooperation and dialogue with the majority. Participating in the governing coalition is important as the alliance can greatly contribute through governmental means to the improvement of the life of the Hungarian community in Romania. The presence and role in the Romanian government of the UDMR protects the status and future of ethnic minorities in Romania and safeguards their evolution. The presence of the UDMR in the Romanian government is not limited to benefits in the field of Romanian politics: the fact bears an important message for states in the vicinity of Hungary, where ethical issues have lately appeared to be increasingly problematic. Since 1999 the UDMR has been a member of the European People's Party (EPP), and since 1991 it is member of the Federal Union of European Nationalities (FUEN).

Various specific goals, gradually detailed during the years, include:

- Free use of mother tongue in private and public life, as well as in administration and justice;
- Development of a native-language school system, with all levels and all types of instruction;
- Full restitution of the community and Church-owned properties that were confiscated during the Communist regime;
- Autonomy and self governance for Szeklerland;
- Cultural autonomy for all national minorities in Romania (national minority law in the Romanian Parliament 2005);
- Decentralization of administration.

The UDMR leaders have claimed on several occasions that they believe local autonomy (decentralization) to be the most appropriate and efficient form of self-government. However, the UDMR has also stated that it wishes to achieve this goal only through a dialogue and consensus with the Romanian majority, and based on proven Western European models.

The UDMR has been criticized on several occasions for its lack of specific doctrine. The main argument for preserving the current structure is that if it split up into smaller fractions of different ideological orientations, it would be impossible for the Hungarian community to obtain more seats in the Parliament (one single seat is allocated to each minority group by default) due to the electoral threshold of 5%.

Several voices from within the UDMR and the Hungarian community have criticized it for being too moderate and making too many compromises in political treaties with other Romanian parties. The Hungarian Civic Alliance, formed by Hungarians against the UDMR, and the Hungarian People's Party of Transylvania (PPMT) formed by former members of the UDMR aimed to form separate, more radical, political entities. However, during the 2004 and 2008 elections, the UDMR proved to still have the endorsement of the overwhelming majority of Hungarians. Disputes with this fraction group led to the departure of László Tőkés (who endorsed the PPMT) from the position of honorary president. In 2009 Tőkés joined, as frontrunner, the Hungarian Unity list for the European Parliamentary elections in Romania, but as elected Member of the European Parliament, he became an independent politician and resigned from his UDMR membership.

In 2022, the UDMR proposed an amendment to the Romanian Child Protection Law that would ban the discussion of homosexuality and gender identity in public spaces. The bill passed in the Senate of Romania in April 2022 and was approved by the Romanian Human Rights Commission but requires approval by Romania's lower house of Parliament.

Despite the fact that UDMR maintains a moderate autonomist outlook, some politicians and pundits in Romania criticized several leading figures of the party as Hungarian nationalist, separatist, and anti-Romanian.

== Achievements ==
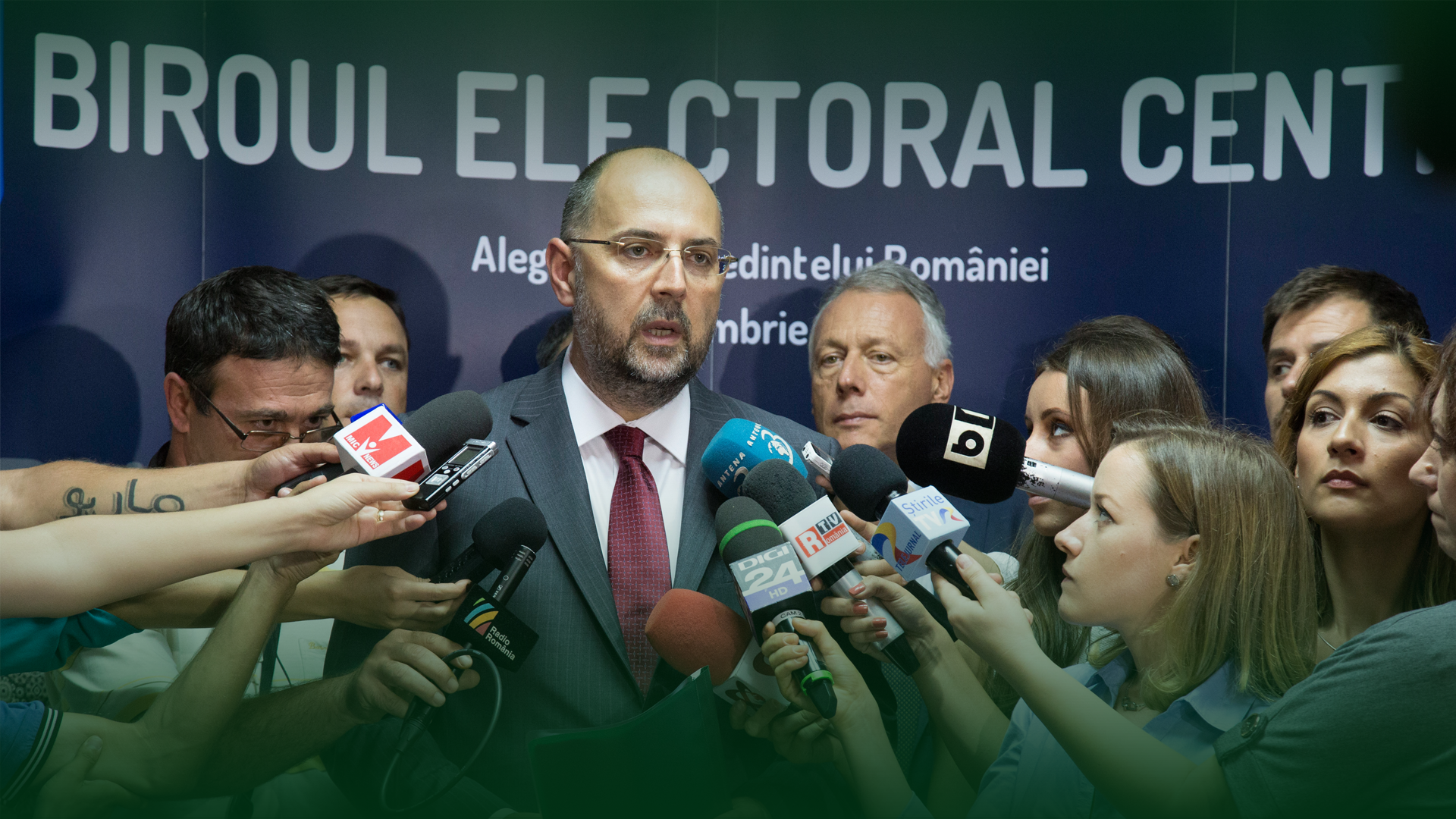
Current leader of the UDMR, Hunor Kelemen, ran as a presidential candidate in 2009, 2014, 2019, and 2024.

1989–1999:

- Developments in the educational system, including reclaiming for Hungarian-language education in some (though not all) schools that were transformed during the Communist regime;
- The law that allowed partial restitution of real estate confiscated during the Communist regime;
- Amendment to the administrative law, allowing for the use of Hungarian names of towns and villages as well as Romanian names (on public signs and indicators) where Hungarians live in numbers larger than 20%.

2000–2004:

- Adoption of restitution law of community forest, community and church real estates;
- Construction of new educational establishments, conservation of important historical buildings;
- Implementation of language rights in administration and justice;
- The inauguration of the symbolic Liberty (Szabadság) statue in Arad, demolished by the communist regime.

2004–2008:

- Establishment of the Institute for Minority Studies in Cluj;
- Establishment of new schools for professional education;
- Construction of sport establishments across Transylvania;
- The opening of the General Consulate of Hungary in Miercurea-Ciuc;
- Availability of a Hungarian language telephone directory.

2010:

- Decentralization process in the education and in health services;
- The History and Geography of Romania can be learned in mother tongue;
- The Hungarian language education benefits from more funding, the establishments are administered by the local authorities.

2011:

- Important public investment were channeled into Hungarian led local communities, including sewage and water systems;
- The renewal of the 12 national road across Szeklerland;
- The UDMR managed to stop the intention of the political majority to create new and bigger administrative units, which would mint the diminution of Hungarian led counties.

2012–2013:

- The establishment of a Council for Cultural Autonomy, aiming to create a network of all goods and heritage of the Hungarian community in Romania;
- The UDMR presented the Transylvania 2020 project about the investment opportunities and development of the EU funding based on the 2014-2020 MFF of the EU;
- The UDMR together with the FUEN and the SVP from South Tyrol initiated the Minority SafePack European Citizens’ Initiative.

== Electoral history ==
=== Parliamentary elections ===
Election	Chamber			Senate			Position	Aftermath
Election	Votes	%	Seats	Votes	%	Seats	Position	Aftermath
1990	991,601	7.23	29 / 395	1,004,353	7.20	12 / 119	2nd	Opposition to FSN government (1990–1991)
1990	991,601	7.23	29 / 395	1,004,353	7.20	12 / 119	2nd	Opposition to FSN-PNL-MER-PDAR government (1991–1992)
1992	811,290	7.46	27 / 341	831,469	7.58	12 / 143	5th	Opposition to PDSR-PUNR-PRM government (1992–1996)
1996	812,628	6.64	25 / 343	837,760	6.82	11 / 143	4th	CDR-USD-UDMR government (1996–2000)
2000	736,863	6.80	27 / 345	751,310	6.90	12 / 140	5th	Endorsing PDSR minority government (2000–2004)
2004	628,125	6.17	22 / 332	637,109	6.10	10 / 137	4th	DA-PUR-UDMR government (2004–2007)
2004	628,125	6.17	22 / 332	637,109	6.10	10 / 137	4th	PNL-UDMR minority government (2007–2008)
2008	425,008	6.20	22 / 334	440,449	6.39	9 / 137	4th	Opposition to PDL-PSD government (2008–2009)
2008	425,008	6.20	22 / 334	440,449	6.39	9 / 137	4th	PDL-UNPR-UDMR government (2009–2012)
2008	425,008	6.20	22 / 334	440,449	6.39	9 / 137	4th	Opposition to USL government (2012)
2012	380,656	5.14	18 / 412	388,528	5.24	9 / 176	4th	Opposition to USL government (2012–2014)
2012	380,656	5.14	18 / 412	388,528	5.24	9 / 176	4th	PSD-UNPR-UDMR-PC government (2014)
2012	380,656	5.14	18 / 412	388,528	5.24	9 / 176	4th	Opposition to PSD-UNPR-ALDE government (2014–2015)
2012	380,656	5.14	18 / 412	388,528	5.24	9 / 176	4th	Endorsing the technocratic Cioloș Cabinet (2015–2017)
2016	435,969	6.19	21 / 329	440,409	6.24	9 / 136	4th	Endorsing PSD-ALDE government (2017–2019)
2016	435,969	6.19	21 / 329	440,409	6.24	9 / 136	4th	Opposition to PSD minority government (2019)
2016	435,969	6.19	21 / 329	440,409	6.24	9 / 136	4th	Endorsing PNL minority government (2019–2020)
2016	435,969	6.19	21 / 329	440,409	6.24	9 / 136	4th	Opposition to PNL minority government (2020)
2020	339,030	5.74	21 / 330	348,262	5.89	9 / 136	5th	PNL-USR PLUS-UDMR government (2020–2021)
2020	339,030	5.74	21 / 330	348,262	5.89	9 / 136	5th	PNL-UDMR minority government (2021)
2020	339,030	5.74	21 / 330	348,262	5.89	9 / 136	5th	CNR (with PSD and PNL) government (2021–2023)
2020	339,030	5.74	21 / 330	348,262	5.89	9 / 136	5th	Opposition to CNR government (2023–2024)
2024	585,589	6.34	22 / 331	590,783	6.38	10 / 136	7th	
2024	585,589	6.34	22 / 331	590,783	6.38	10 / 136	7th	PSD-PNL-UDMR minority government (2024–2025)
2024	585,589	6.34	22 / 331	590,783	6.38	10 / 136	7th	PNL-UDMR minority government (2025)
2024	585,589	6.34	22 / 331	590,783	6.38	10 / 136	7th	PSD-PNL-USR-UDMR government (2025–2026)
2024	585,589	6.34	22 / 331	590,783	6.38	10 / 136	7th	PNL-USR-UDMR minority government (2026)
2024	585,589	6.34	22 / 331	590,783	6.38	10 / 136	7th	Endorsing PSD minority government (2026–present)

=== Local elections ===
Election	County Councilors (CJ)			Mayors			Local Councilors (CL)			Popular vote	%	Position
Election	Votes	%	Seats	Votes	%	Seats	Votes	%	Seats	Popular vote	%	Position
2008	429,329	5.13	89 / 1,393	378,413	4.28	184 / 3,179	404,657	4.75	2,195 / 40,297	—N/a	—N/a	4th
2012	473,783	5.60	88 / 1,338	400,627	4.89	202 / 3,121	435,205	5.41	2,248 / 39,121	—N/a	—N/a	4th
2016	411,823	4.98	95 / 1,434	315,236	3.69	195 / 3,186	390,321	4.66	2,284 / 40,067	—N/a	—N/a	4th
2020	379,924	5.28	92 / 1,340	299,334	4.01	199 / 3,176	362,442	4.92	2,360 / 39,900	379,924	5.28	6th
2024	506,659	6.42	104 / 1,340	378,594	4.31	200 / 3,176	471,588	5.42	2,525 / 39,900	378,594	4.32	5th

Election	County Presidents (PCJ)			Position
Election	Votes	%	Seats	Position
1992	—N/a	—N/a	4 / 41	3rd
1996	—N/a	—N/a	6 / 41	3rd
2000	—N/a	—N/a	4 / 41	3rd
2004	—N/a	—N/a	5 / 41	4th
2008	419,028	5.26	4 / 41	4th
2012	467,420	5.45	2 / 41	4th
2016	—N/a	—N/a	5 / 41	3rd
2020	366,480	5.04	4 / 41	3rd
2024	—N/a	—N/a	4 / 41	3rd

=== Presidential elections ===
Election	Candidate	First round			Second round		
Election	Candidate	Votes	Percentage	Position	Votes	Percentage	Position
1996	György Frunda	761,411	6.0%	4th	not qualified		
2000	György Frunda	696,989	6.2%	5th	not qualified		
2004	Béla Markó	533,446	4.1%	4th	not qualified		
2004	Adrian Năstase^{1}	not endorsed			4,881,520	48.77%	2nd
2009	Hunor Kelemen	372,761	3.83%	5th	not qualified		
2014	Hunor Kelemen	329,727	3.47%	8th	not qualified		
2019	Hunor Kelemen	357,014	3.87%	6th	not qualified		
2024	Hunor Kelemen	416,353	4.50%	7th	not qualified		
2024	Elena Lasconi^{2}	not endorsed			election annulled		
2025	Crin Antonescu^{3}	1,892,930	20.07%	3rd	not qualified		
2025	Nicușor Dan^{4}	not endorsed			6,168,642	53.6%	1st

Notes:

^{1} PSD candidate endorsed by UDMR/RMDSZ in the second round.

^{2} USR candidate endorsed by UDMR/RMDSZ in the second round, which was ultimately not held.

^{3} Common candidate of the Romania Forward Electoral Alliance, a coalition of the governing PSD and PNL endorsed alongside UDMR/RMDSZ.

^{4} Independent candidate endorsed by UDMR/RMDSZ in the second round.

=== European elections ===
Election	Votes	Percentage	MEPs	Position	EU Party	EP Group
2007	282,929	5.52%	2 / 35	5th	EPP	EPP Group
2009	431,739	8.92%	3 / 33	4th	EPP	EPP Group
2014	350,689	6.29%	2 / 32	5th	EPP	EPP Group
2019	476,777	5.26%	2 / 32	6th	EPP	EPP Group
2024	579,180	6.48%	2 / 32	4th	EPP	EPP Group

== See also ==
- Hungarians in Romania
- Székely autonomy movement
