= Țurcan =

Ţurcan or Turcan is a Romanian-language surname that may refer to:

- Aurel Țurcan (1876–1939), Austro-Hungarian-born Romanian politician
- Elena Turcan (born 1975), Moldovan former footballer
- Iaser Țurcan (born 1998), Moldovan footballer
- Ioan Țurcan (1818–1902), ethnic Romanian Austro-Hungarian Orthodox priest and politician
- Jean Turcan (1846–1895), French sculptor
- Leonida Țurcan (1894–?), Moldovan politician
- Mihai Țurcan (footballer, born 1941), Romanian footballer
- Mihai Țurcan (footballer, born 1989), Moldovan footballer
- Nicolae Țurcan (born 1989), Moldovan football goalkeeper
- Raluca Turcan (born 1976), Romanian politician
- Romeo V. Turcan (born 1970), Moldovan professor
- Valeriu Turcan (born 1976), Romanian political consultant and journalist
- Veaceslav Țurcan (1965–2021), Moldovan lawyer and human rights activist
- Vladimir Țurcan (born 1954), Moldovan judge and former politician

== See also ==
- Țurcanu (surname)
