= Costin Borc =

Romanian engineer and economist

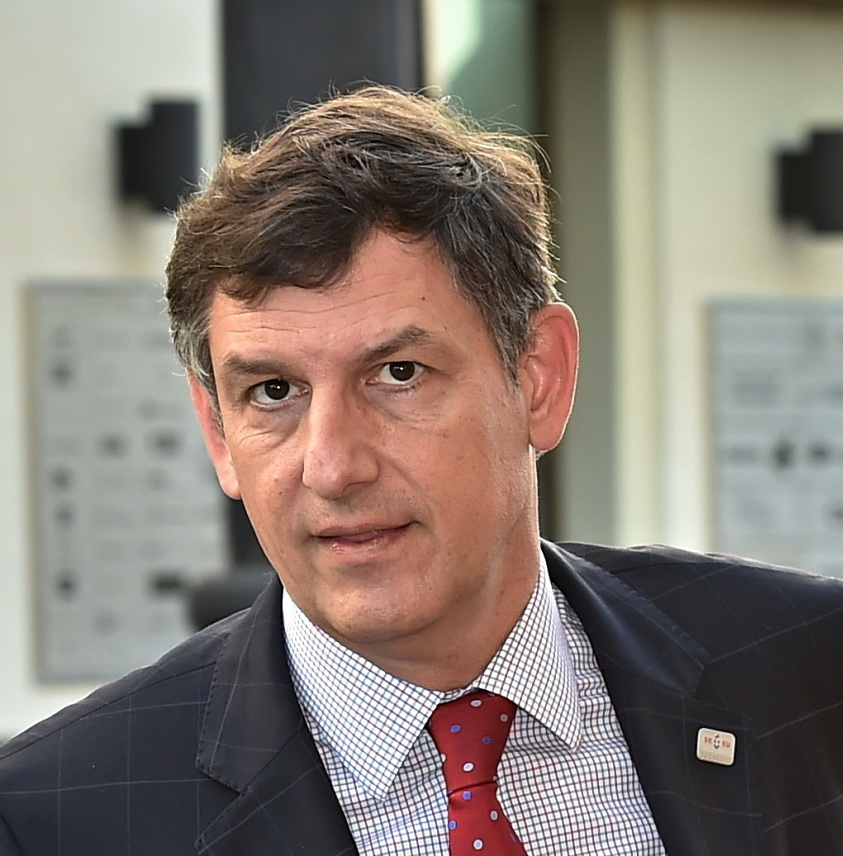
- Portrait of Costin Borc

Deputy Prime Minister of Romania Minister of Economy, Trade and Tourism
- In office 17 November 2015 – 4 January 2017
- President: Klaus Iohannis
- Prime Minister: Dacian Cioloș
- Preceded by: Gabriel Oprea
- Succeeded by: Sevil Shhaideh

Personal details
- Born: 7 May 1965 (age 60) Bucharest, Romania

Costin Borc (born 7 May 1965) is a Romanian engineer and economist who was the Deputy Prime Minister and Minister of Economy, Trade and Tourism in the Cioloș Cabinet. He took office on 17 November 2015.
