= Țurcanu =

Țurcanu is a Romanian-language surname. Notable people with the surname include:

- Eugen Țurcanu (1925–1954), Romanian communist criminal
- Ion Țurcanu (born 1946), Moldovan historian, politician and scholar
- Iurie Țurcanu (born 1973), Moldovan politician
- Lucia Bercescu-Țurcanu (1911–1995), Romanian opera singer
- Radu David Țurcanu (born 2006), Romanian tennis player
- Victoria Țurcanu (born 1996), Moldovan footballer
- Viorica Țurcanu (born 1954), Romanian fencer

== See also ==
- Țurcan (surname)
