= Drochia =

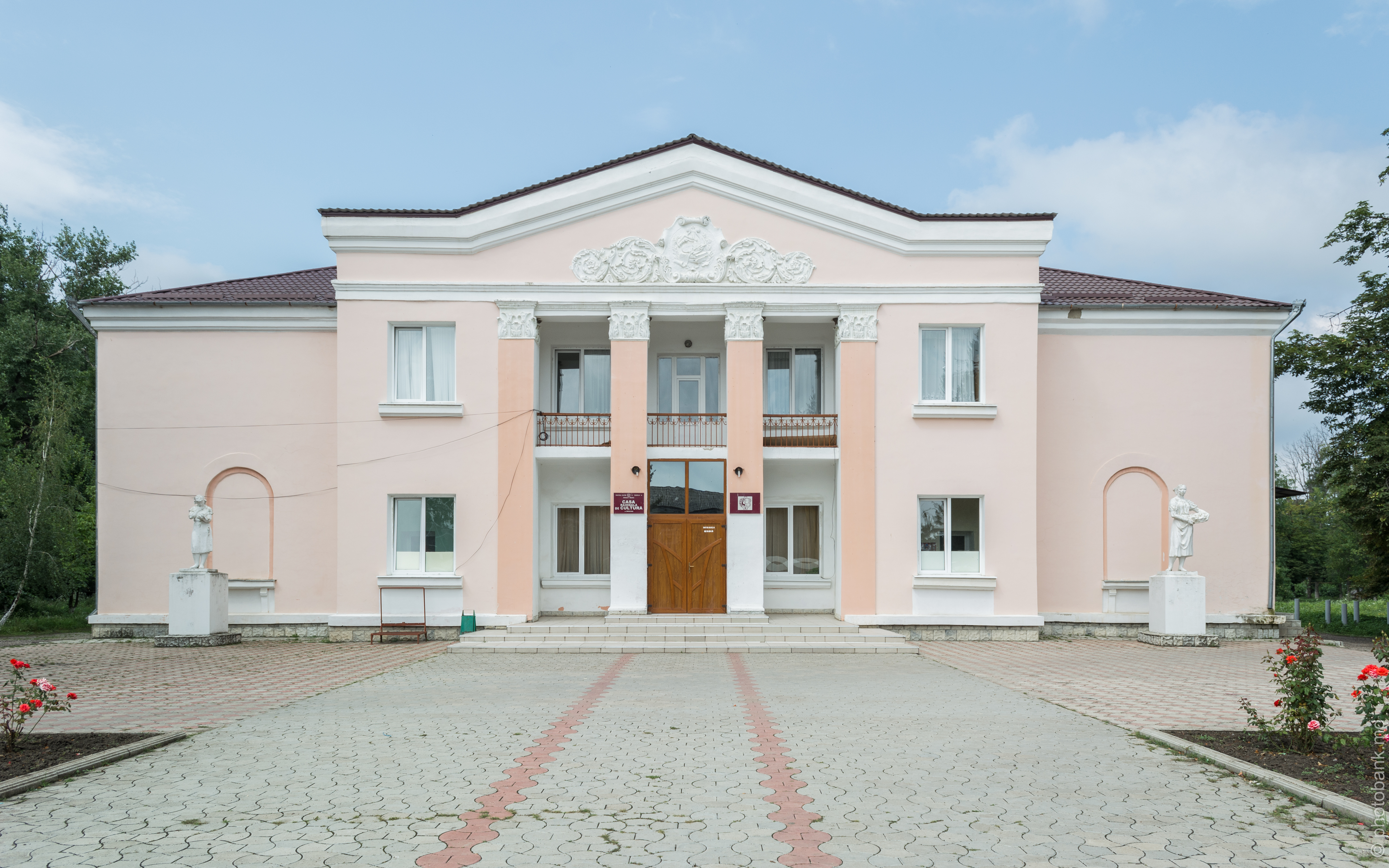
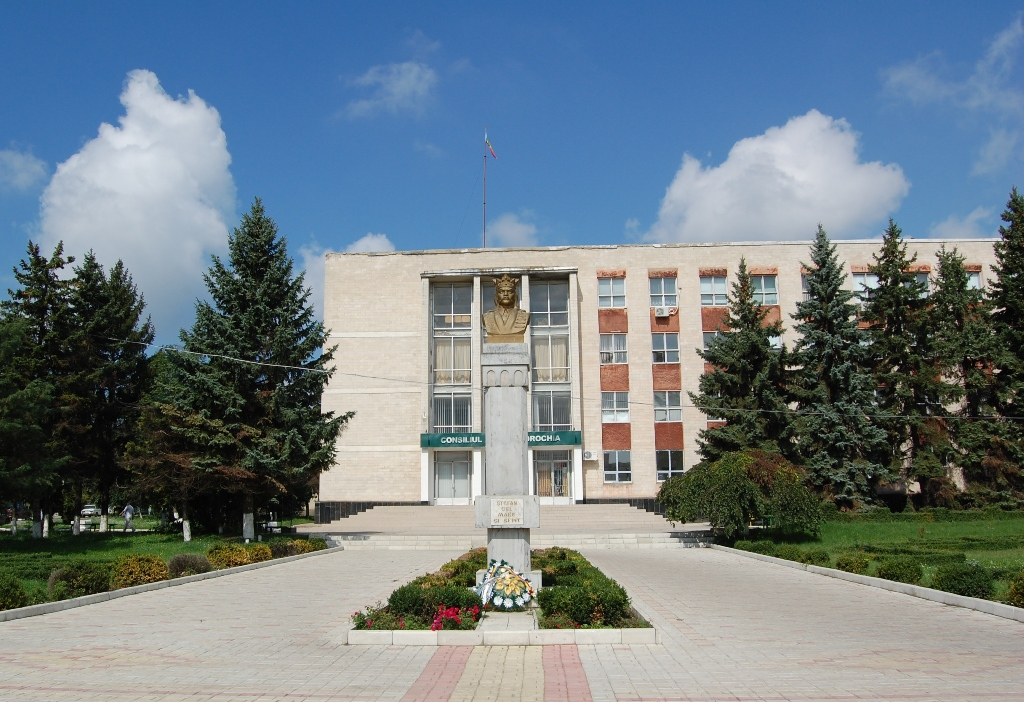
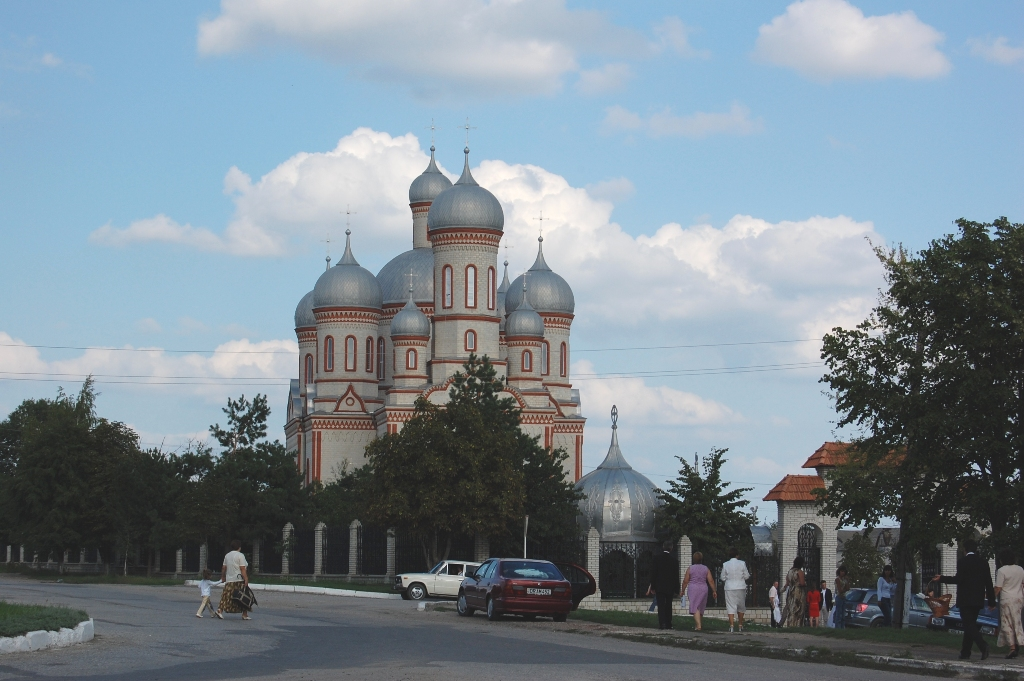
- Drochia

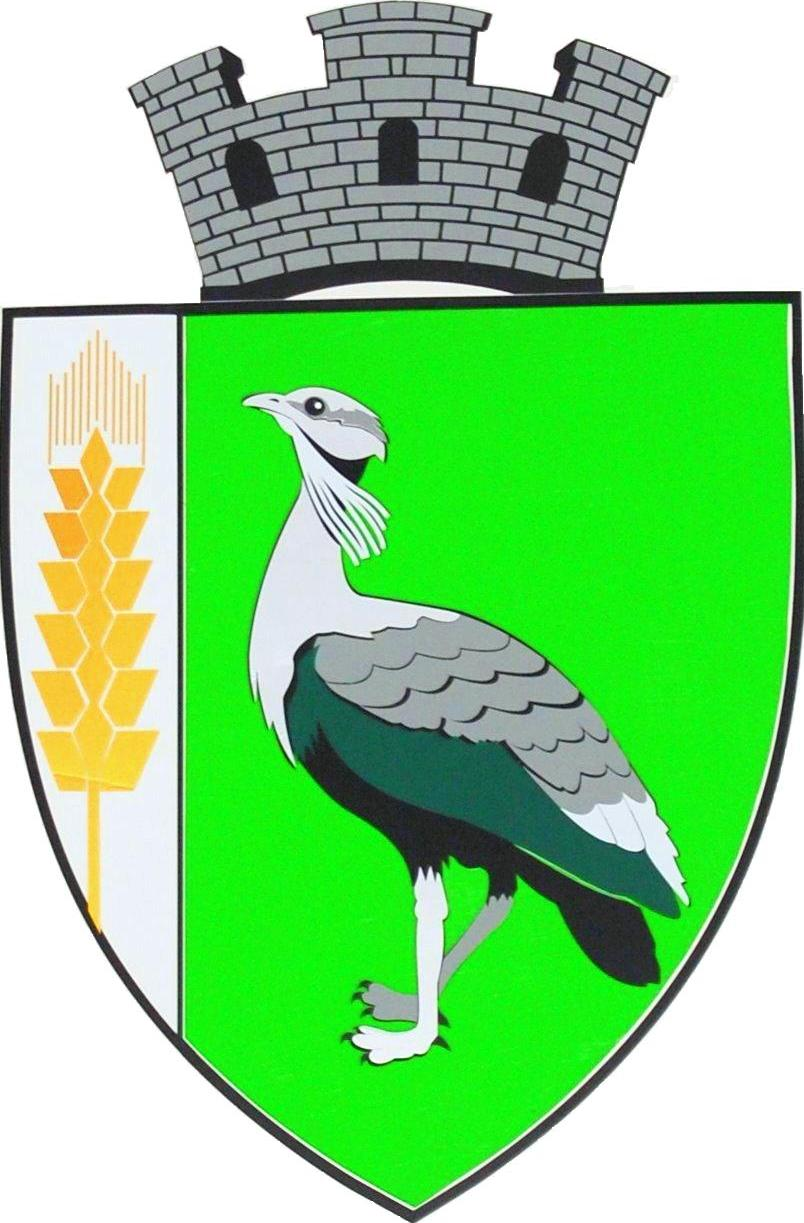
- Flag Coat of arms

- Location in Moldova
- Coordinates: 48°2′N 27°45′E
- Country: Moldova
- District: Drochia District
- Established: 1777

Government
  - Mayor: Cereteu Nina (PN), since 2015
- Elevation: 741 ft (226 m)

Population (2014)
  - Total: 13,150
- Time zone: UTC+2 (EET)
  - Summer (DST): UTC+3 (EEST)
- Postal code: MD-52xx
- Area code: +373 252 xx x xx
- Climate: Dfb

Drochia (Romanian pronunciation: [ˈdroki.ja]) is a city in the northern part of Moldova. It is the administrative center of the eponymous district. The city is located 174.4 km (108.4 mi) north of the national capital, Chișinău, and 67 km (42 mi) north-east of the Romanian city of Iași. The average elevation of Drochia is 226 meters. The population at the 2004 census was 16,606.

The name of the city comes from a local type of bird, called dropie (English: great bustard).

== History ==
Drochia is first mentioned by chroniclers in 1777. By 1830 it was a small settlement encompassing 25 families. A document dating from 1847 notes that a small grape-processing plant, the town's first industrial enterprise, had been built. Two mills situated on a local stream were built in 1875.

More intensive industrial development emerged after the railway first came through at the end of the 19th century. At the 1930 census, the locality (then a village) was known as Drochia-Gară (literally Drochia Station), and had a population of only 595. It was part of Plasa Bădiceni of the Soroca County.

Drochia received the status of a city in 1973.

== Demographics ==
According to the 2024 census, 12,939 inhabitants lived in Drochia, a decrease compared to the previous census in 2014, when 13,150 inhabitants were registered.

Ethnic composition of Drochia (2024)
1. Moldovans (Note: There is an ongoing controversy regarding the ethnic identification of Moldovans and Romanians.) (85.6%)
2. Romanians (4.70%)
3. Ukrainians (6.70%)
4. Russians (2.30%)
5. Others (0.70%)
Linguistic composition of Drochia (2024)
1. Moldovan (Note: In March 2023, the Parliament of Moldova passed a law updating all legislative texts and the constitution to refer to the national language as Romanian, effectively rendering the term "Moldovan" obsolete.) (59.2%)
2. Romanian (24.4%)
3. Russian (13.0%)
4. Ukrainian (3.10%)
5. Other (0.30%)

Historical population
Year	Pop.	±%
1930	595	—
1959	6,638	+1015.6%
1970	11,161	+68.1%
1979	15,280	+36.9%
1989	21,298	+39.4%
2004	16,606	−22.0%
2014	13,150	−20.8%
2024	12,939	−1.6%

=== Historical demographics ===
Ethnic composition (1930 Census)
Romanians	181
Ruthenians and Ukrainians	77
Russians	209
Jews	112
Poles	5
Armenians	7
Serbians, Croatians, Slovenes	1
others	3
Total	595

Linguistic composition (1930 Census)
Romanian	198
Russian	210
Yiddish	102
Ukrainian	80
Polish	4
other	1
Total	595

== Media ==
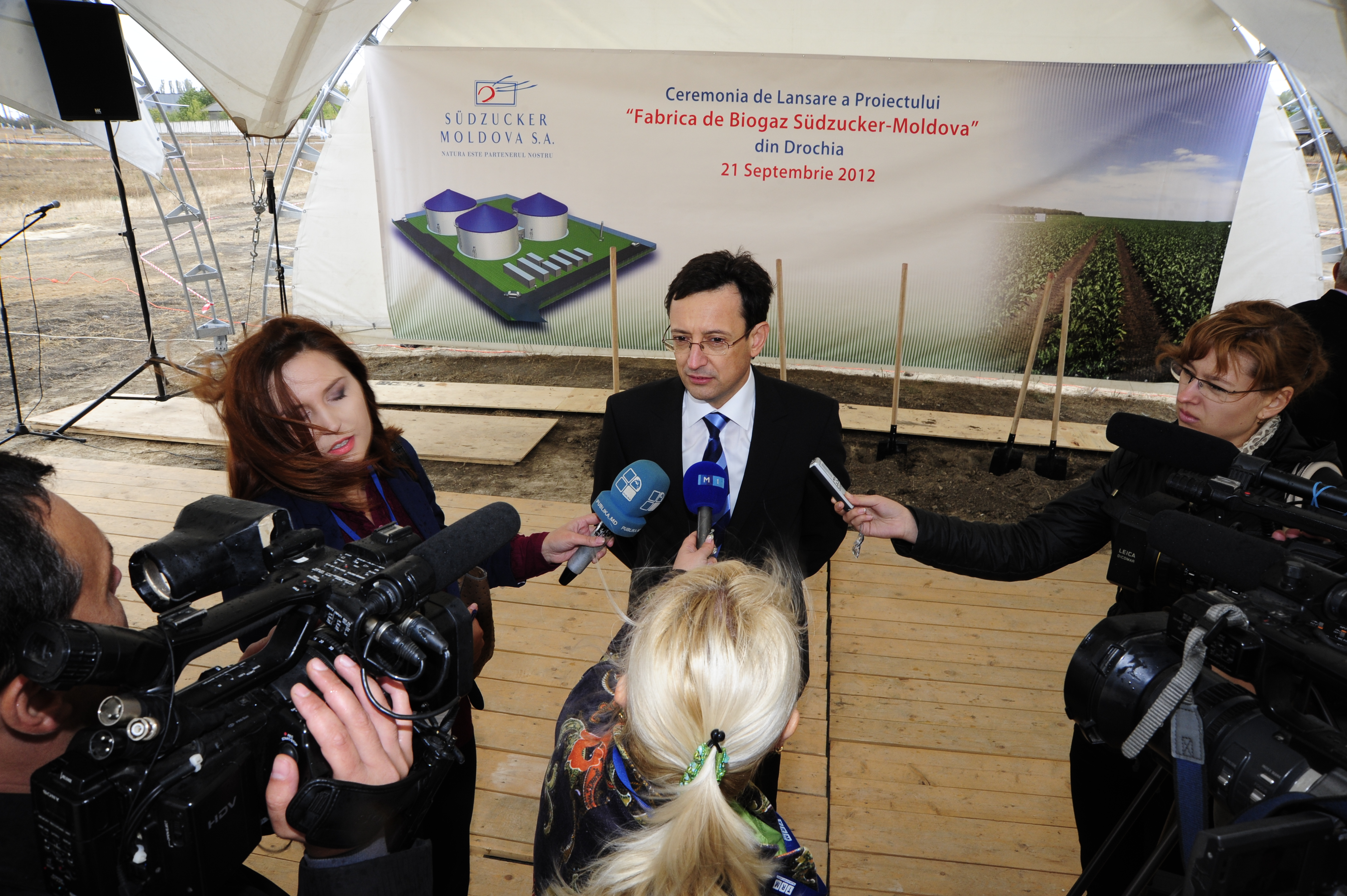
Journalists interviewing Octavian Armașu during the inauguration of a biogas plant outside the city, 2012

- Radio Chișinău 93.8 FM
- Vocea Basarabiei 101,0
- Radio Studentus www.studentus.md/listen.html

== Mayors of Drochia ==
- Anatol Pleșca 1991–1999
- Valeriu Ceban 1999–2007
- Grigore Melnic 2007 – 2011
- Igor Grozavu 2011 – 2015
- Nina Cereteu 2015 - 2023
- Nina Cereteu 2023 - present

== International relations ==
=== Twin towns – Sister cities ===
Drochia is twinned with:

- Borisov, Belarus
- Dorohoi, Romania
- Kolomyia, Ukraine
- Rădăuți, Romania
- Pineto, Italy

== Notable people ==
- Romeo V. Turcan, professor
- Victor Pînzaru, athlete

== Photo gallery ==
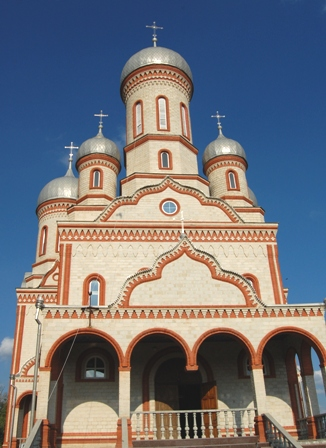
Cathedral of the "Adormirea Maicii Domnului"

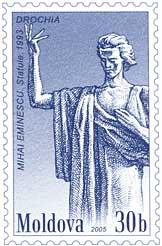
Monument of Mihai Eminescu

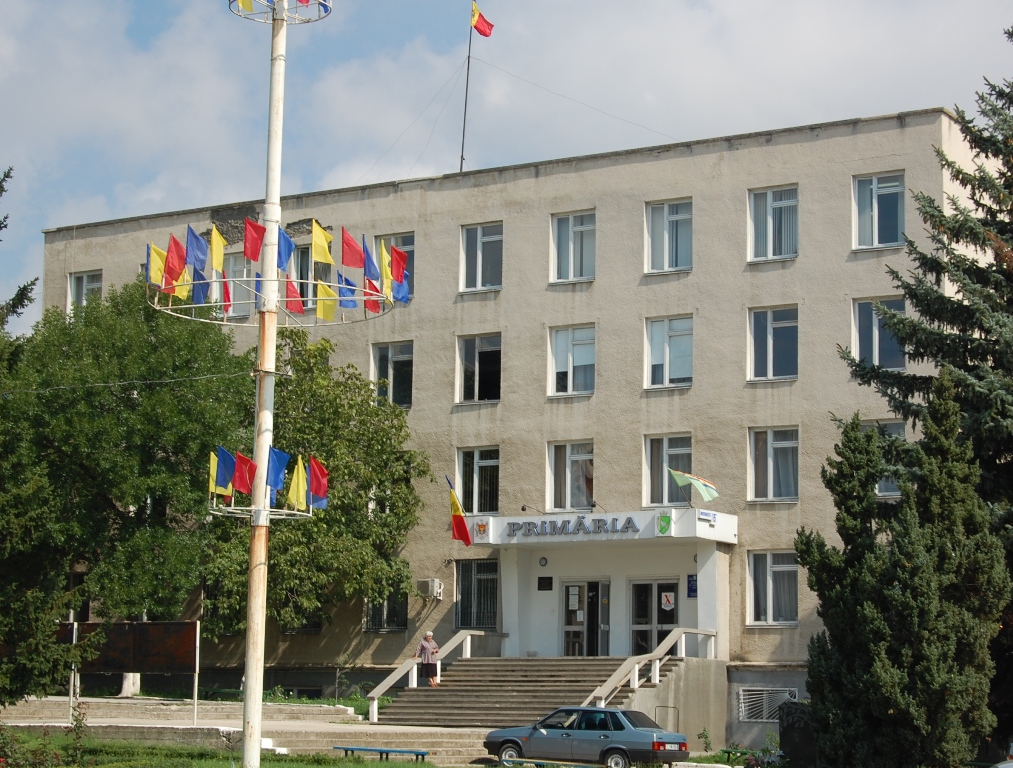
City Hall

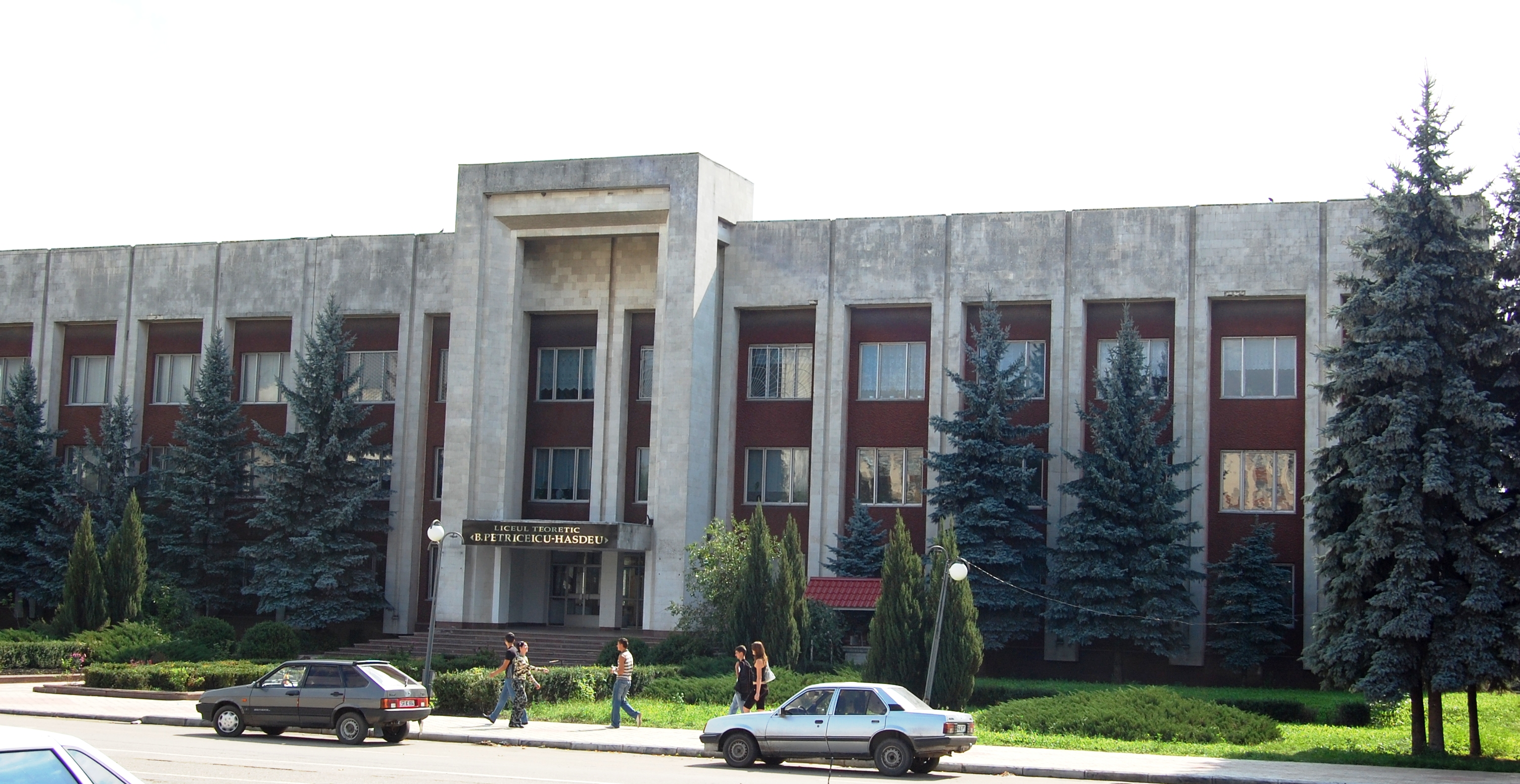
Bogdan Petriceicu Hasdeu High School

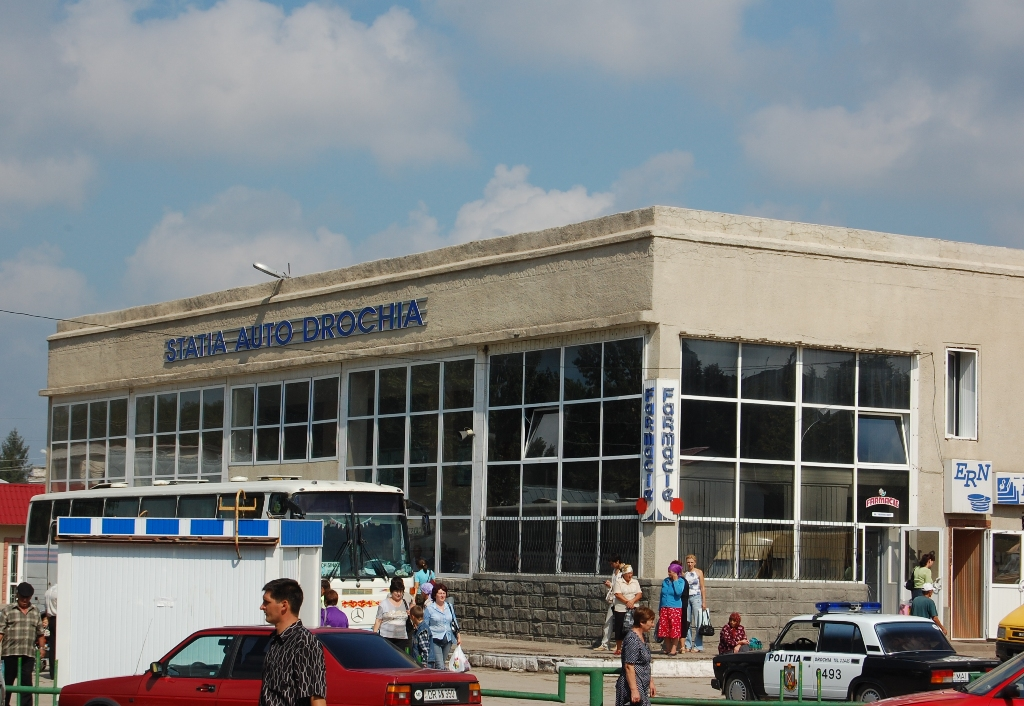
Drochia Bus Terminal

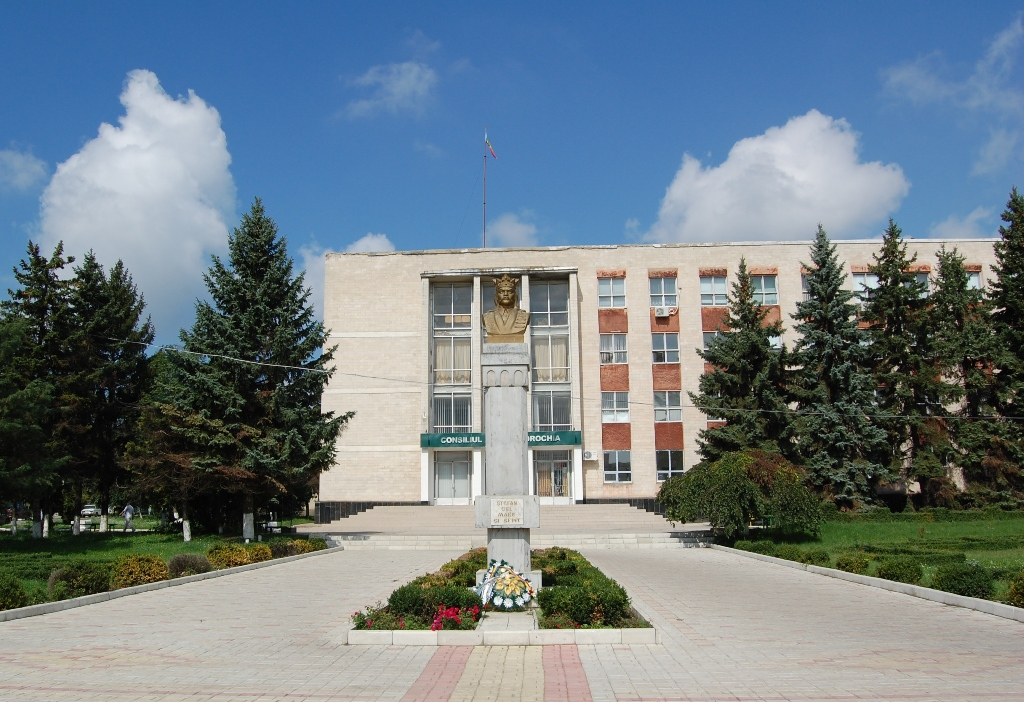
Drochia District Council and the monument of Stephen III of Moldavia

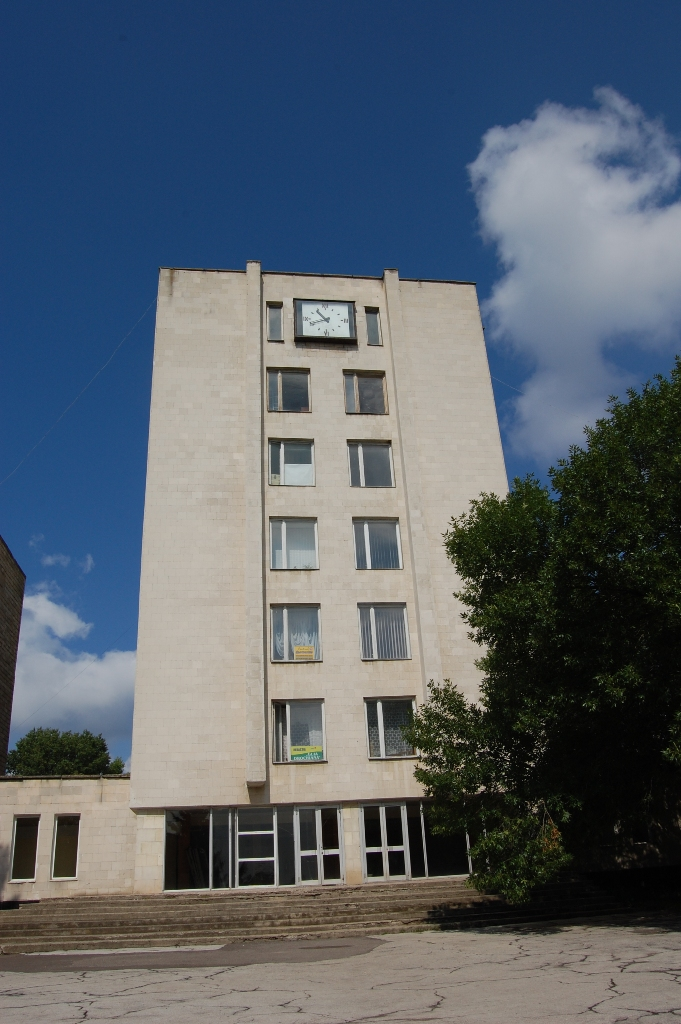
Office building

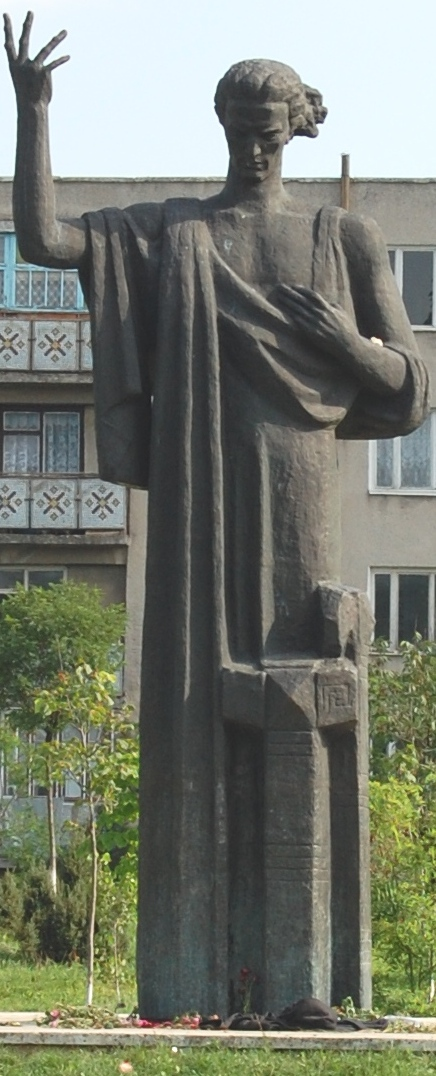
Monument of Mihai Eminescu
