= Berceanu =

Berceanu (pronunciation: [berˈt͡ʃe̯anu]) is a Romanian surname. Notable people with the surname include:

- Gheorghe Berceanu (1949–2022), Romanian wrestler
- Radu Berceanu (born 1953), Romanian engineer and politician
