= Vasile Dîncu =

Romanian politician

Vasile Dîncu MEP
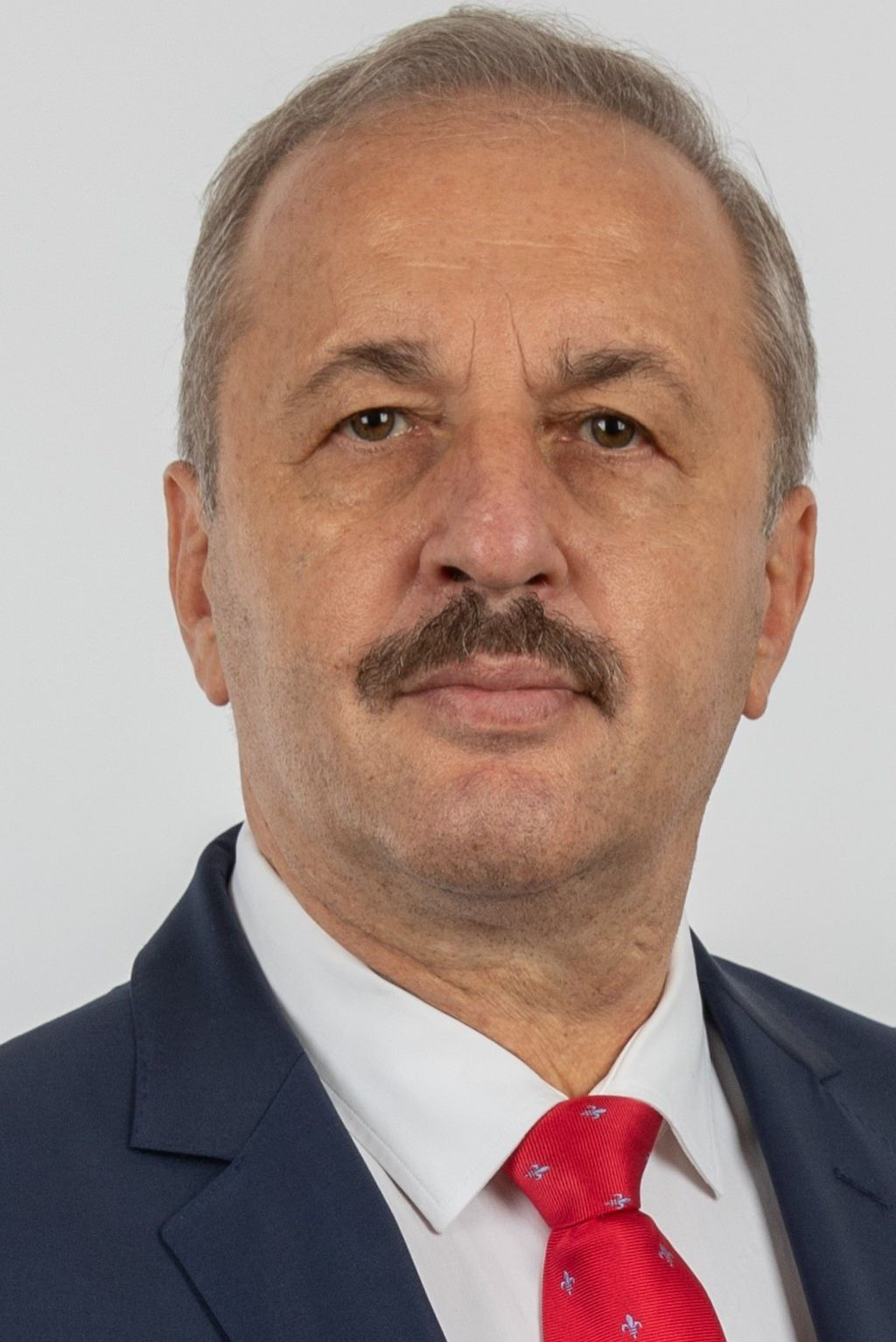
- Official portrait, 2020

Minister of National Defence
- In office 25 November 2021 – 24 October 2022
- Prime Minister: Nicolae Ciucă
- Preceded by: Nicolae Ciucă
- Succeeded by: Nicolae Ciucă (interim)

Deputy Prime Minister of Romania
- In office 17 November 2015 – 4 January 2017
- President: Klaus Iohannis
- Prime Minister: Dacian Cioloș
- Preceded by: Gabriel Oprea
- Succeeded by: Sevil Shhaideh

Minister of Regional Development and Public Administration
- In office 17 November 2015 – 4 January 2017
- Preceded by: Sevil Shhaideh
- Succeeded by: Sevil Shhaideh

Member of the European Parliament for Romania
- In office 1 January 2007 – 13 May 2007

Senator
- Incumbent
- Assumed office 21 December 2020
- In office 14 February 2004 – 20 December 2008

Personal details
- Born: 25 November 1961 (age 64) Năsăud, Cluj Region, Romanian People's Republic
- Party: Social Democratic Party
- Scientific career
- Education: Babeș-Bolyai University
- Fields: Politics, sociology, history, and pedagogy
- Workplaces: University of Bucharest; Babeș-Bolyai University

Vasile Sebastian Dîncu (Romanian pronunciation: [vaˈsile ˈdɨŋku]; born 25 November 1961) is a Romanian politician, sociologist, professor and writer who served as Deputy Prime Minister in the Cioloș Cabinet and was Minister of National Defence in the Ciucă Cabinet.

== Biography ==
Vasile Dîncu was born on 25 November 1961 in Năsăud, a town now in Bistrița-Năsăud County. Dîncu is a member of the Social Democratic Party (PSD) since 2019, having previously been part of the party from 2000 to 2008. He has also been a Member of the European Parliament, of the Party of European Socialists (PES) and a Senator of Romania.

Between 2015 and 2017, Dîncu served as Deputy Prime Minister and Minister of Regional Development and Public Administration in the cabinet of former Prime Minister of Romania Dacian Cioloș. He then retired from politics for a while, but later returned and, on 2020, he was elected once again as a member of the Senate of Romania for PSD. On 25 November 2021, Dîncu was appointed as Minister of National Defence in the Ciucă Cabinet, succeeding Nicolae Ciucă in his post as the latter became the new Prime Minister of Romania. On 24 October 2022 Dîncu resigned as Minister of National Defence following comments he made on social media recommending the US and NATO should negotiate with Russia on behalf of Ukraine. He also cited an inability to collaborate with the President as his reason for resigning.

Dîncu has published several books. He is a member of the Writers' Union of Romania.

Dîncu was also an active Holocaust denier under the Ion Iliescu's government.
