= Cristian Boureanu =

Romanian businessman and politician (born 1972)

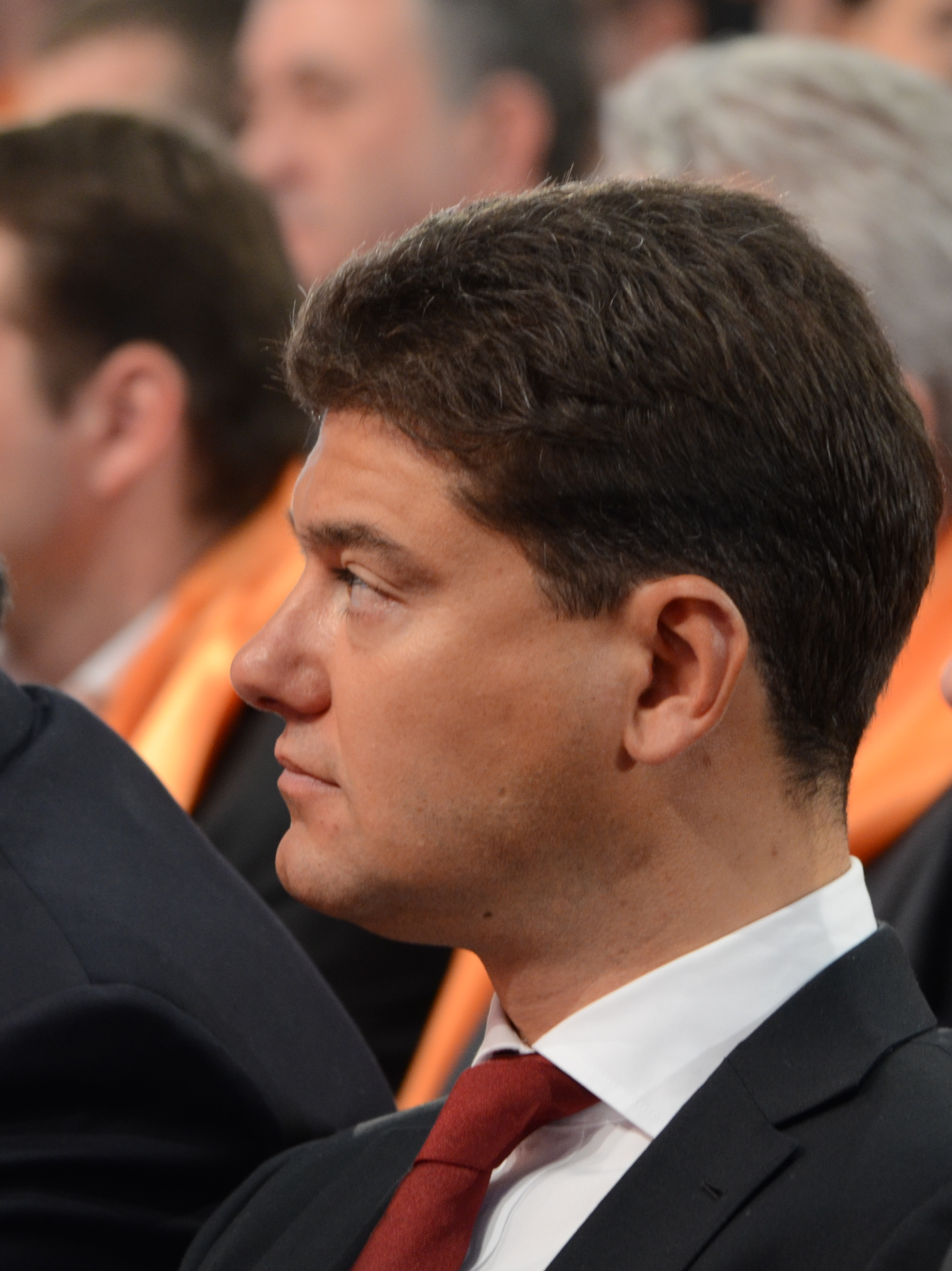
- Cristian Boureanu (March 2013)
- Born: December 15, 1972; Lusaka, Zambia
- Occupation(s): Businessman and politician

Cristian Alexandru Boureanu (born December 15, 1972) is a Romanian businessman and politician. A former member of the Democratic Liberal Party (PD-L), he was a member of the Romanian Chamber of Deputies for Argeș County from 2004 to 2012.

He and his first wife Irina had a daughter before divorcing in 2003. In 2007, he married Valentina Pelinel, a former model, and divorced her in 2014.

== Biography ==
He was born in Lusaka, Zambia, where his parents were temporarily working as geological engineers, and in 1991 completed secondary studies at the Mathematics-Physics High School in Bucharest. From 1991 to 1996, he attended the International Economic Relations Faculty of the Bucharest Academy of Economic Studies. He holds a 2003 degree from the Carol I National Defence University, and in 2004 received a master's degree in governance and institutional development from the National School of Administration and Political Science of Bucharest. From April 1999 to December 2000, he worked as an adviser at the Finance Ministry. From 2000 to 2001, he was an adviser to the president of the Chamber of Deputies' economic committee. He is a private investor in companies active in various sectors, such as commerce, construction and economic consultancy. In early 2008, his property holdings were worth an estimated €13.5 million, in addition to valuables and bank accounts.

Boureanu entered politics in 1995, when he joined the National Liberal Party (PNL). From May 1998 to April 2000, he was secretary general of the National Liberal Youth, serving as the organisation's president from that time until October 2002. From January 2001 to August 2002, he served on the PNL's permanent central bureau; he then advanced to the executive central bureau, where he remained until February 2005. That month, he returned to the permanent central bureau, serving until December. At that point, he was suspended from the PNL: the party leadership, including Prime Minister Călin Popescu-Tăriceanu, viewed as unacceptable Boureanu's accusations that certain of his colleagues had conducted negotiations with the opposition Social Democratic Party. He remained suspended until September 2006, when he and fellow dissident member Raluca Turcan were ejected entirely, having been warned in July to cease making public statements against party decisions and having continued to do so. He then joined the Liberal Democratic Party, serving as its vice president for political and international relations from March 2007 to February 2008, when the party merged with the Democratic Party to form the Democratic Liberal Party. Within the PD-L, he serves as a vice president and as president of its Argeș County chapter. Meanwhile, he was first elected to the Chamber in 2004, serving on the industry and services committee, including as its vice president until September 2006. Re-elected in 2008, he served as vice president on the same committee, and was part of the Romanian Parliament's delegation to the Assembly of the Western European Union. At the 2012 election, he ran for a seat centered around Huși, losing to a local farmer and political novice on a 62-23 margin. He subsequently criticized the Right Romania Alliance, blaming it for the scale of the PD-L's defeat.

Aside from his public feud with the PNL leadership, which involved acid criticism of Tăriceanu (whom he once called a "corrupt prime minister" and a "toxic product for the Romanian people"), Boureanu has been involved in other controversies as well. In May 2008, he was the subject of a criminal investigation for "abuse of office against the public interest" by the National Anticorruption Directorate for his role in signing a contract in 2000 between Loteria Română and the Greek firm Intralot that caused the former to incur losses of over €120 million. In summer 2009, he drew attention for his attempts to end the work of the parliamentary committee investigating abuses by Youth and Sport Minister and PD-L colleague Monica Iacob Ridzi. His verbal interventions were also noted, with one Social Democrat claiming he had insulted seven or eight of the committee's members; at one point, he addressed chairwoman Alina Gorghiu as "missie" and made mention of her "lovers". Boureanu was convicted of assaulting a police officer in 2017, for which he received a suspended sentence of 1 year and 9 months.
