= Deputy Prime Minister of Romania =

- Viceprim‑ministru al Guvernului României
- Appointer: Prime Minister of Romania
- Website: gov.ro

The Deputy Prime Minister of Romania (Romanian: Vice prim ministru României), officially the Deputy Prime Minister of the Government of Romania (Romanian: Vice prim ministru Guvernului României), is a minister in the Government of Romania. It is considered a non-portfolio role.

== Current deputy prime ministers ==
| Photo | Name | Party | Since |
|---|---|---|---|
| | Marian Neacșu | PSD | 15 June 2023 |
| | Cătălin Predoiu | PNL | 15 June 2023 |
| | Barna Tánczos | UDMR | 23 Dec 2024 |
| | Ionuț Moșteanu | USR | 23 Jun 2025 |

== List of deputy prime ministers (1932–1947) ==
| Portrait | Name | Term of office | | Party | Prime Minister |
|---|---|---|---|---|---|
| | Gheorghe Mironescu | 20 October 1932 | 13 November 1933 | PNȚ | Iuliu Maniu; Alexandru Vaida-Voevod |
| Office not in use | | 1933–1936 | | —N/a | |
| | Ion Inculeț | 29 August 1936 | 14 November 1937 | | Gheorghe Tătărescu |
| Office not in use | | 1937–1939 | | —N/a | |
| | Armand Călinescu | 1 February 1939 | 6 March 1939 | FRN | Miron Cristea |
| Office not in use | | 1939–1940 | | —N/a | |
| | Gheorghe Mihail | 4 July 1940 | 4 September 1940 | Mil. | Ion Gigurtu |
| | Horia Sima | 14 September 1940 | 20 January 1941 | Iron Guard | Ion Antonescu |
| | Mihai Antonescu | 20 January 1941 | 23 August 1944 | Independent | Ion Antonescu |
| | Petru Groza | 4 November 1944 | 28 February 1945 | FP | Constantin Sănătescu; Nicolae Rădescu |
| | Gheorghe Tătărescu | 6 March 1945 | 5 November 1947 | PNL-T | Petru Groza |

== List of first vice presidents of the Council of Ministers (1948–1989) ==
| Portrait | Name | Term of office | | Party | Prime Minister |
|---|---|---|---|---|---|
| | Gheorghe Gheorghiu-Dej | 15 April 1948 | 2 June 1952 | PMR | Petru Groza |
| Office not in use | | 1952–1954 | | —N/a | |
| | Chivu Stoica | 20 August 1954 | 4 October 1955 | PMR | Gheorghe Gheorghiu-Dej |
| | Iosif Chișinevschi | 20 August 1954 | 4 October 1955 | PMR | Gheorghe Gheorghiu-Dej |
| | Alexandru Drăghici | 20 August 1954 | 4 October 1955 | PMR | Gheorghe Gheorghiu-Dej |
| | Emil Bodnăraș | 4 October 1955 | 19 March 1957 | PMR | Chivu Stoica |
| | Alexandru Drăghici | 4 October 1955 | 19 March 1957 | PMR | Chivu Stoica |
| | Miron Constantinescu | 4 October 1955 | 19 March 1957 | PMR | Chivu Stoica |
| | Petre Borilă | 4 October 1955 | 19 March 1957 | PMR | Chivu Stoica |
| Office not in use | | 1957–1961 | | —N/a | |
| | Gheorghe Apostol | 21 March 1961 | 17 March 1965 | PMR | Ion Gheorghe Maurer |
| | Alexandru Drăghici | 18 March 1965 | 24 July 1965 | PMR | Ion Gheorghe Maurer |
| | Emil Bodnăraș | 18 March 1965 | 20 August 1965 | PMR | Ion Gheorghe Maurer |
| | Gheorghe Apostol | 18 March 1965 | 20 August 1965 | PMR | Ion Gheorghe Maurer |
| | Ilie Verdeț | 24 July 1965 | 20 August 1965 | PCR | Ion Gheorghe Maurer |
| | Gheorghe Apostol | 21 August 1965 | 3 January 1967 | PCR | Ion Gheorghe Maurer |
| | Emil Bodnăraș | 21 August 1965 | 8 December 1967 | PCR | Ion Gheorghe Maurer |
| | Alexandru Bârlădeanu | 21 August 1965 | 8 December 1967 | PCR | Ion Gheorghe Maurer |
| | Ilie Verdeț | 3 January 1967 | 8 December 1967 | PCR | Ion Gheorghe Maurer |
| | Ilie Verdeț | 9 December 1967 | 18 March 1975 | PCR | Ion Gheorghe Maurer; Manea Mănescu |
| Office not in use | | 1975–1978 | | —N/a | |
| | Ilie Verdeț | 7 March 1978 | 30 March 1979 | PCR | Manea Mănescu |
| | Gheorghe Oprea | 7 March 1978 | 30 March 1979 | PCR | Manea Mănescu |
| | Gheorghe Oprea | 30 March 1979 | 29 March 1980 | PCR | Ilie Verdeț |
| | Gheorghe Oprea | 29 March 1980 | 22 December 1989 | PCR | Ilie Verdeț; Constantin Dăscălescu |
| | Ion Dincă | 29 March 1980 | 22 December 1989 | PCR | Ilie Verdeț; Constantin Dăscălescu |
| | Elena Ceaușescu | 29 March 1980 | 22 December 1989 | PCR | Ilie Verdeț; Constantin Dăscălescu |

== List of deputy prime ministers (1989–present) ==
| Portrait | Name | Term of office | | Party | Prime Minister |
|---|---|---|---|---|---|
| | Mihai Drăgănescu | 28 December 1989 | 31 May 1990 | FSN | Petre Roman |
| | Gelu Voican Voiculescu | 28 December 1989 | 28 June 1990 | FSN | Petre Roman |
| | Ion Aurel Stoica | 28 March 1990 | 28 June 1990 | FSN | Petre Roman |
| | Anton Vătășescu | 28 March 1990 | 28 June 1990 | FSN | Petre Roman |
| Office not in use | | 1990–2008 | | —N/a | |
| | Dan Nica | 22 December 2008 | 1 October 2009 | PSD | Emil Boc |
| | Vasile Blaga (Acting) | 1 October 2009 | 27 November 2009 | PDL | Emil Boc |
| | Béla Markó | 23 December 2009 | 9 February 2012 | UDMR | Emil Boc; Mihai Răzvan Ungureanu |
| Office not in use | | 2012 | | —N/a | |
| | Florin Georgescu | 7 May 2012 | 21 December 2012 | Independent | Victor Ponta |
| | Daniel Chițoiu | 21 December 2012 | 19 February 2014 | PNL | Victor Ponta |
| | Liviu Dragnea | 21 December 2012 | 5 March 2014 | PSD | Victor Ponta |
| | Gabriel Oprea | 21 December 2012 | 5 March 2014 | UNPR | Victor Ponta |
| | Victor Ponta (Acting) | 19 February 2014 | 5 March 2014 | PSD | Victor Ponta |
| | Kelemen Hunor | 5 March 2014 | 24 November 2014 | UDMR | Victor Ponta |
| | Liviu Dragnea | 5 March 2014 | 13 December 2014 | PSD | Victor Ponta |
| | Gabriel Oprea | 5 March 2014 | 13 December 2014 | UNPR | Victor Ponta |
| | Daniel Constantin | 5 March 2014 | 13 December 2014 | PC | Victor Ponta |
| | Csilla Hegedüs | 24 November 2014 | 13 December 2014 | UDMR | Victor Ponta |
| | Gabriel Oprea | 17 December 2014 | 9 November 2015 | UNPR | Victor Ponta |
| | Vasile Dîncu | 17 November 2015 | 4 January 2017 | Independent | Dacian Cioloș |
| | Costin Borc | 17 November 2015 | 4 January 2017 | Independent | Dacian Cioloș |
| | Daniel Constantin | 4 January 2017 | 3 April 2017 | ALDE | Sorin Grindeanu |
| | Sevil Shhaideh | 4 January 2017 | 14 June 2017 | PSD | Sorin Grindeanu |
| | Grațiela-Leocadia Gavrilescu | 3 April 2017 | 14 June 2017 | ALDE | Sorin Grindeanu |
| | Augustin Jianu | 16 June 2017 | 29 June 2017 | PSD | Sorin Grindeanu |
| | Sevil Shhaideh | 29 June 2017 | 17 October 2017 | PSD | Mihai Tudose |
| | Marcel Ciolacu | 29 June 2017 | 29 January 2018 | PSD | Mihai Tudose |
| | Grațiela Gavrilescu | 29 June 2017 | 29 January 2018 | ALDE | Mihai Tudose |
| | Paul Stănescu | 17 October 2017 | 29 January 2018 | PSD | Mihai Tudose |
| | Grațiela Gavrilescu | 29 January 2018 | 27 August 2019 | ALDE | Viorica Dăncilă |
| | Paul Stănescu | 29 January 2018 | 4 November 2019 | PSD | Viorica Dăncilă |
| | Viorel Ștefan | 29 January 2018 | 4 November 2019 | PSD | Viorica Dăncilă |
| | Raluca Turcan | 4 November 2019 | 23 December 2020 | PNL | Ludovic Orban |
| | Dan Barna | 23 December 2020 | 6 September 2021 | USR | Florin Cîțu |
| | Kelemen Hunor | 23 December 2020 | 25 November 2021 | UDMR | Florin Cîțu |
| | Sorin Grindeanu | 25 November 2021 | 15 June 2023 | PSD | Nicolae Ciucă |
| | Kelemen Hunor | 25 November 2021 | 15 June 2023 | UDMR | Nicolae Ciucă |
| | Marian Neacșu | 15 June 2023 | 25 April 2026 | PSD | Marcel Ciolacu; Cătălin Predoiu (acting); Ilie Bolojan |
| | Cătălin Predoiu | 15 June 2023 | 20 October 2026 | PNL | Marcel Ciolacu; Cătălin Predoiu (acting); Ilie Bolojan |
| | Barna Tánczos | 23 December 2024 | 20 October 2026 | UDMR | Marcel Ciolacu; Cătălin Predoiu (acting); Ilie Bolojan |
| | Marian Neacșu | 20 October 2026 | Incumbent | PSD | Luca Niculescu |

== See also ==
- List of heads of government of Romania
