= Paul Stănescu =

Romanian politician (born 1957)

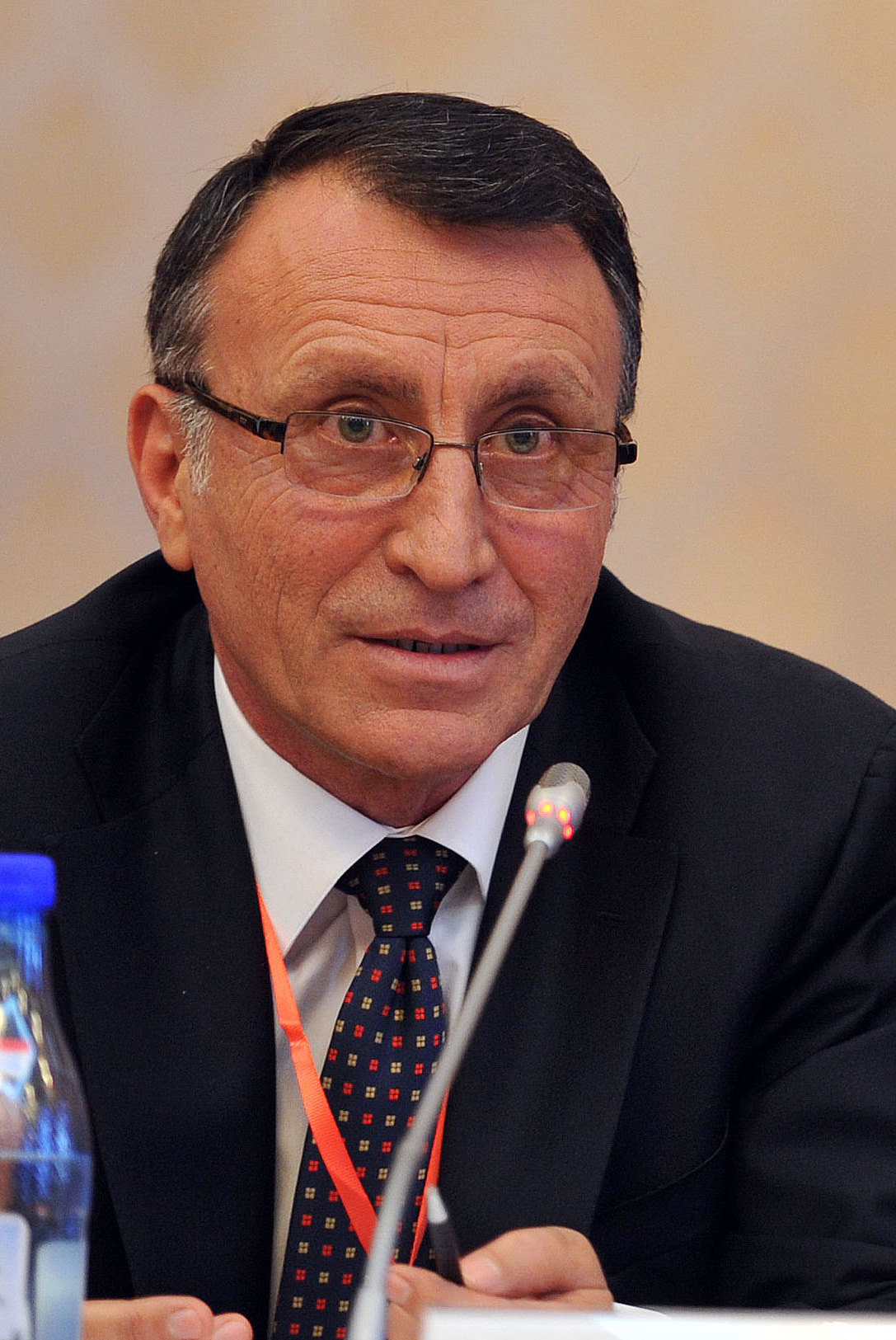

Deputy Prime Minister of Romania
- In office 17 October 2017 – 4 November 2019
- President: Klaus Iohannis
- Prime Minister: Mihai Tudose; Viorica Dăncilă
- Preceded by: Sevil Shhaideh
- Succeeded by: Raluca Turcan

Minister of Regional Development
- In office 17 October 2017 – 4 November 2019
- President: Klaus Iohannis
- Prime Minister: Mihai Tudose; Viorica Dăncilă
- Preceded by: Sevil Shhaideh

Personal details
- Born: 25 August 1957 (age 68)

Paul Stănescu (Romanian pronunciation: [ˈpa.ul stəˈnesku]; born 25 August 1957) is a Romanian politician. He served as the Deputy Prime Minister and Minister of Regional Development from 17 October 2017 to 4 November 2019.

In 1978, Stănescu entered the agronomy faculty of the University of Craiova, graduating in 1982. From that year until 1987, he headed the canning factory in Caracal. From 1988 to 1991, he directed the state agricultural enterprise in Studina village. From 1992 to 2008, Stănescu managed an agricultural firm in Vișina village. From 2008 to 2016, he was president of the Olt County Council. In 2016, he was elected to the Romanian Senate.
