= Ludovic Orban =

Prime Minister of Romania from 2019 to 2020

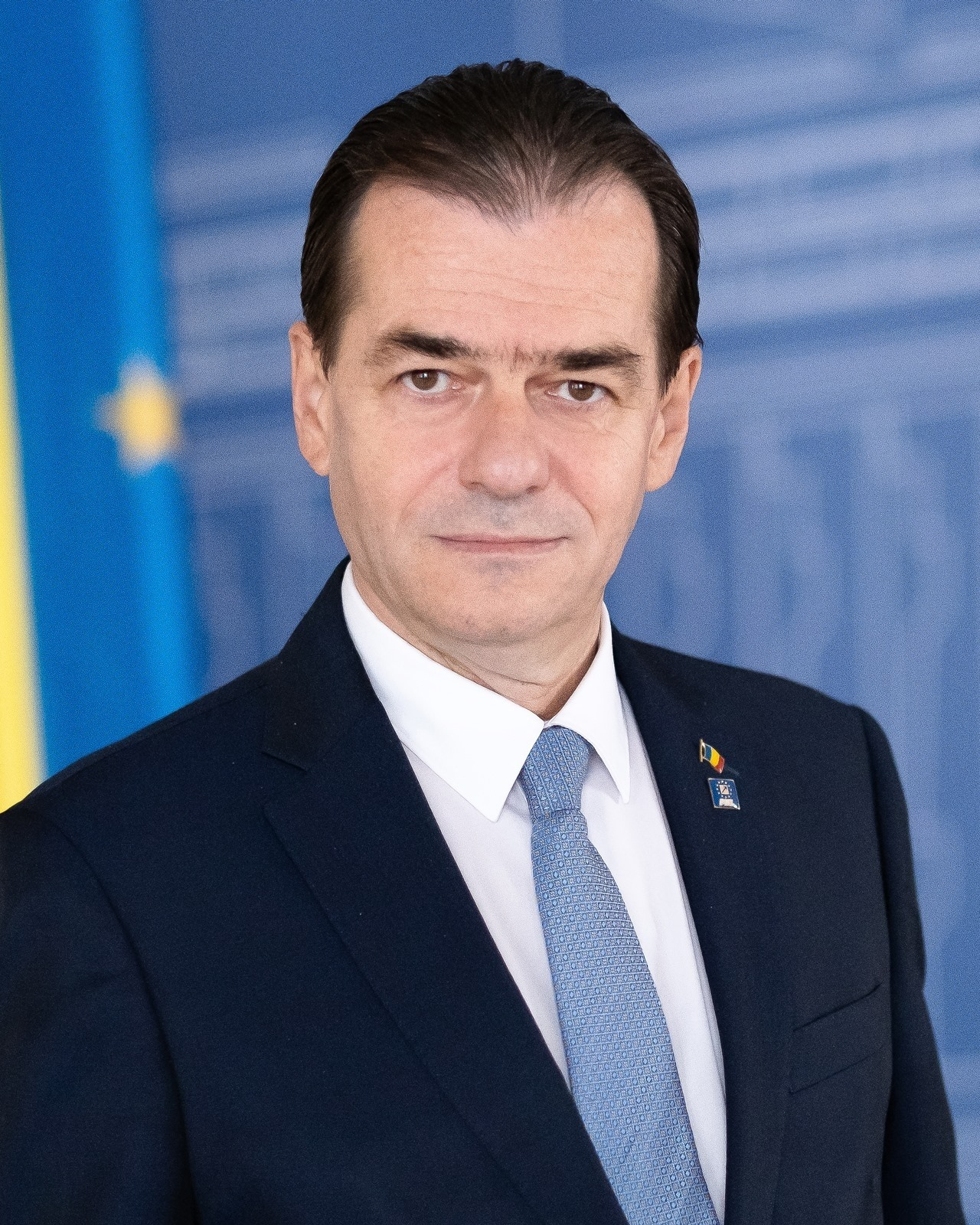
- Official portrait, 2020

Prime Minister of Romania
- In office 4 November 2019 – 7 December 2020
- President: Klaus Iohannis
- Deputy: Raluca Turcan
- Preceded by: Viorica Dăncilă
- Succeeded by: Florin Cîțu

President of the Chamber of Deputies
- In office 22 December 2020 – 13 October 2021
- Preceded by: Marcel Ciolacu
- Succeeded by: Marcel Ciolacu

President of the National Liberal Party
- In office 17 June 2017 – 25 September 2021
- Preceded by: Alina Gorghiu
- Succeeded by: Florin Cîțu

President of the Force of the Right
- Incumbent
- Assumed office 14 December 2021
- Preceded by: Office established

Minister of Transport
- In office 5 April 2007 – 22 December 2008
- Prime Minister: Călin Popescu-Tăriceanu
- Preceded by: Radu Berceanu
- Succeeded by: Radu Berceanu
Parliamentary offices
Member of the Chamber of Deputies
In office 20 December 2020 – 20 December 2024
Constituency	Bucharest
In office 15 December 2008 – 19 December 2016
Constituency	Bucharest
Local offices
Deputy Mayor of Bucharest
In office July 2004 – 5 April 2007
Mayors	Traian Băsescu; Adriean Videanu
Member of the Local Council of Sector 3
In office 23 February 1992 – 16 June 1996
Mayor	Constantin Tutunaru

Personal details
- Born: 25 May 1963 (age 63) Brașov, Romanian People's Republic
- Party: Force of the Right (FD) (2021–present)
- Other political affiliations: National Liberal Party (PNL) (1998–2021); Liberal Party 1993 (PL '93) (1993–1997)
- Spouse: Mihaela Orban
- Children: 1
- Education: Transilvania University of Brașov (UNITBV); National University of Political Studies and Public Administration (SNSPA)
- Religion: Unitarian

Ludovic Orban (Note: Romanian pronunciation: [ˈludovik ˈorban]) (born 25 May 1963) is a Romanian engineer and politician who was the prime minister of Romania from November 2019 to December 2020. He was president of the National Liberal Party (PNL) between 2017 and 2021, which expelled him shortly after he lost a bid for another term as its leader. He was also minister of transport from April 2007 to December 2008 in the second Tăriceanu cabinet.

From 2008 to 2016, he was a member of the Chamber of Deputies for Bucharest. He resumed his parliamentary seat within the Chamber of Deputies after the 2020 Romanian legislative election; shortly thereafter, he was elected president of the Chamber of Deputies of Romania. He resigned from this position in October 2021. Two months later, he founded a new centre-right political party, the Force of the Right (FD).

== Biography ==
=== Early life and career ===
Orban was born in the Transylvanian city of Brașov to an ethnic Hungarian father and an ethnic Romanian mother. He was baptized and confirmed into his father's Unitarian Church of Transylvania, and speaks Hungarian at a basic level. Between 1948 and 1956, under the early communist regime, the elder Orban was an agent of the Securitate secret police. Orban completed secondary studies at the city's Andrei Șaguna High School in 1982. He then studied industrial machinery design technology at the University of Brașov, graduating in 1988. In 1993, he completed post-graduate studies in political science at the National School of Administration and Political Science of Bucharest.

From 1988 to 1990, a period that spanned the Romanian Revolution, he trained as an engineer at an insulation factory in Târgu Secuiesc. He worked as an engineer at a Brașov factory from 1990 to 1991. From 1991 to 1992, he wrote for the daily Viitorul Românesc, and between 1997 and 2001, he held a series of government and agency positions at the Energy Policy Agency, the Disabled Persons Directorate, the Public Information Department, the National Public Employee Agency and the National Centre for Communications and Public Relations Specialisation. He has also been active in a foundation called "Children, the light of the world" and done consulting work.

=== Rise in politics ===
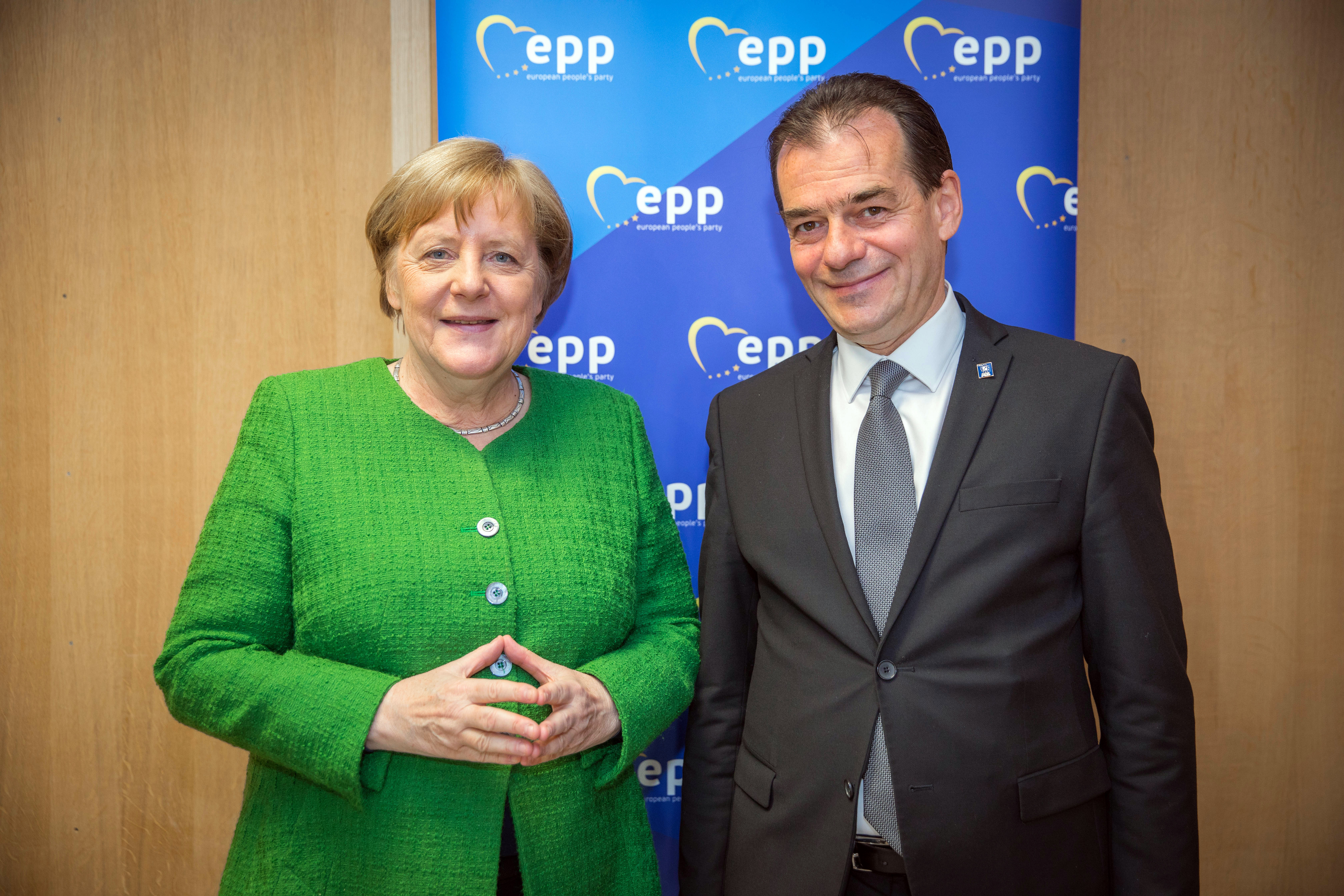
Orban with German Chancellor Angela Merkel with in the EPP Summit in Sibiu, 9 May 2019

Orban was a Sector 3 local councillor from 1992 to 1996. He was elected a Sector 1 local councillor that year, but resigned. From 1992 to 1997, he was an advisor for the Liberal Party 1993 (PL '93) (belonging to the party's executive committee between 1993 and 1997) and its predecessor PNL-AT, two splinter groups of the main National Liberal Party (PNL) which sided with the Romanian Democratic Convention during the mid- to late-1990s. In 1998, he joined the PNL's national council, after the PL '93 merged into it. From 2001 to 2002, he sat on the PNL's permanent central bureau and, in 2002, joined the party's public administration committee. He headed the Bucharest chapter of the PNL from November 2002 and, from July 2004 to April 2007, was deputy mayor of Bucharest.

He left this office following a cabinet reshuffle, becoming transport minister until his party's loss at the 2008 election, where he himself won a seat in a Bucharest constituency. While minister, he also ran for mayor of Bucharest as part of the 2008 local elections, losing in the first round by finishing in fourth place with 11.4% of the vote. In March 2009, concurrent with his ally Crin Antonescu's ascent to the PNL presidency and the sidelining of the Tăriceanu faction, Orban became the party's vice president. He ran for the party presidency in December 2014 and was defeated by Alina Gorghiu on a 47–28 vote. Orban was a candidate in the June 2016 race for mayor of Bucharest, but two months before the election, withdrew from the race as well as from his PNL and Chamber posts after being placed under investigation by the National Anticorruption Directorate. He was not a candidate in the 2016 parliamentary election. In January 2017, the High Court of Cassation and Justice acquitted him on a charge of influence peddling. The following month, he announced his candidacy for the PNL leadership; he went on to defeat Cristian Bușoi by a 78–21 margin.

=== Prime minister and split from PNL ===
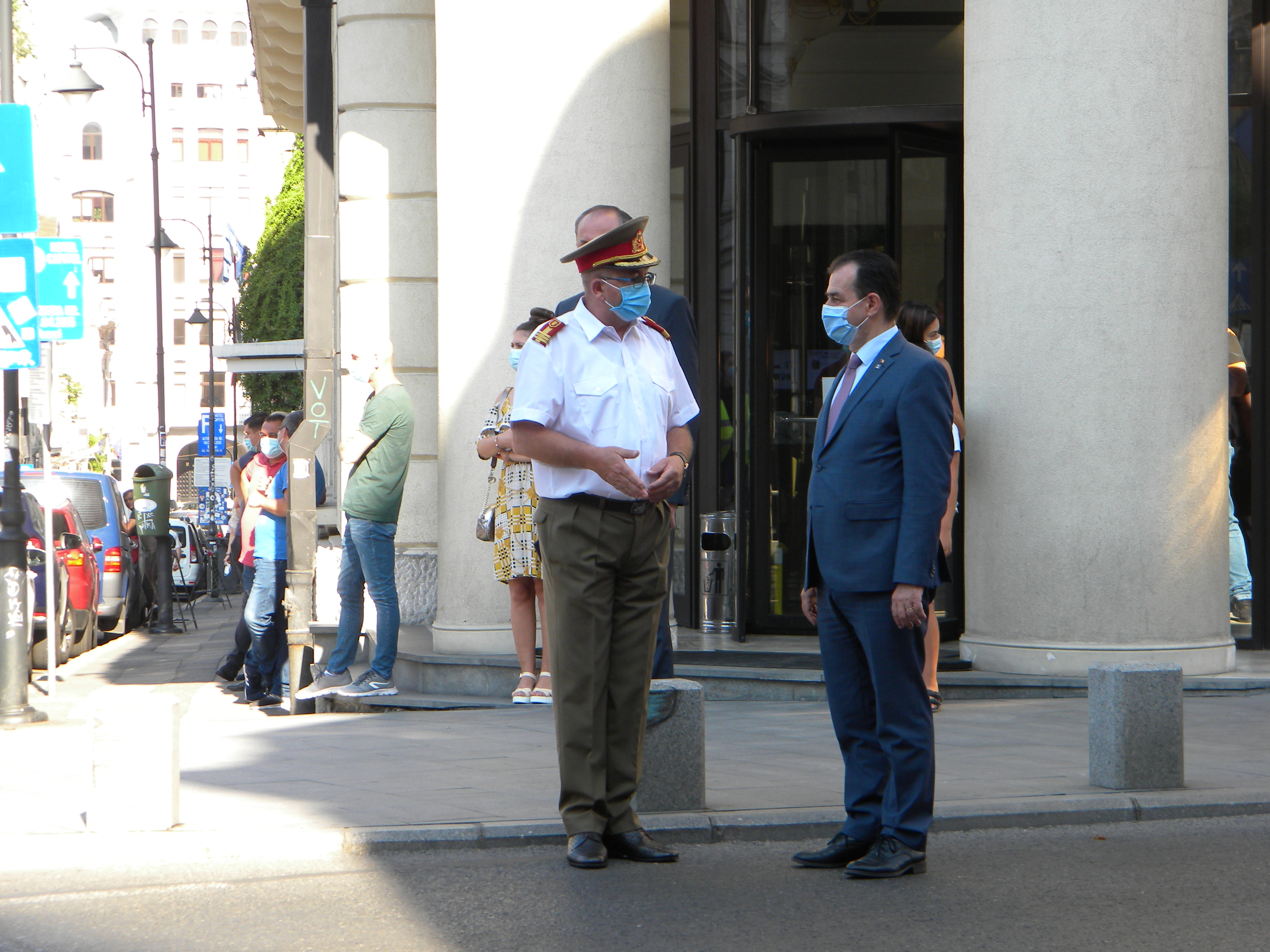
Orban photographed in downtown Bucharest on 29 July 2020

In October 2019, after the fall of Viorica Dăncilă's government, President Klaus Iohannis designated Orban as prime minister. His cabinet received parliamentary approval the following month, with 240 lawmakers voting in favor, seven more than required. His government was ousted via a no-confidence motion in February 2020, with 261 lawmakers voting in favor. The following month, a new Orban-led cabinet received parliamentary approval on a 286–23 vote. Most PNL representatives, including Orban himself, were absent due to suspected exposure to COVID-19. The Social Democrats (PSD) voted in favor of the cabinet, given the emergency circumstances, while pledging concerted opposition. PRO Romania voted against. Orban resigned in December, following the PNL's poor performance at the parliamentary election. At the same time, Orban himself won a new term in the Chamber. Once the new parliament convened, he was elected its president, defeating his PSD rival by a vote of 179–110.

In 2021, Orban ran for a new term as PNL president. During the campaign, he staked out a liberal conservative position, emphasizing a commitment to traditional values and rejecting what he termed "neo-Marxist progressivism". In September, during a party congress, Orban was defeated by Florin Cîțu on a 2,878–1,898 vote, or around 60%-40%. Shortly thereafter, he submitted his resignation as Chamber president to Cîțu. The latter not having taken any action by mid-October, Orban quit by notifying the Chamber secretariat himself. In November, the PNL leadership expelled Orban from the party. The following month, he founded a new centre-right party, Force of the Right (FD). In October 2025, Orban became domestic political advisor to President Nicușor Dan, who fired him a month later. This occurred after Orban criticized the Save Romania Union and its use of Dan’s image during the campaign of Cătălin Drulă for mayor of Bucharest.

== Controversies ==
Orban is a somewhat controversial figure, known for his provocative declarations. A fierce critic of the former president, Traian Băsescu, he called him an "imbecile" for referring to the "imbecile" attitude of a minister during summer 2008 floods, and once shouted, "The President is the last Sauron to rule in this realm of darkness!", referencing The Lord of the Rings of J.R.R. Tolkien.

He also criticised the Emil Boc government, which during 2009 was composed of the Băsescu-associated Democratic Liberal Party and the Social Democrats, referring to the latter party's then-leader, Mircea Geoană, as Băsescu's "steward"; and attacking cabinet policies on education, tourism promotion (which he sees as an unnecessary luxury), and the 2008 financial crisis (where he foresaw the government being unable to pay pensions and salaries). Speaking to a group of female PNL members in Alba County in March 2006, he drew accusations of sexism for saying, "You need not go through any boss's bed to reach important public positions," and declaring that Mioara Mantale, Elena Udrea and party colleague Raluca Turcan had done so, but not Mona Muscă or Norica Nicolai. Driving in Cotroceni in December 2007, his car hit a 16-year-old girl, forcing her hospitalisation; despite a call by the prime minister, Călin Popescu-Tăriceanu, for his resignation, Orban refused to do so and prosecutors ultimately decided not to pursue criminal charges, although his license was suspended and he was fined.

== Personal life ==
Orban and his wife Mihaela have one son. His brother, Leonard Orban, is the former European Commissioner for Multilingualism. He is unrelated to Viktor Orbán, and has said that their sharing a name is often a source of shame for him.

== Electoral history ==
=== Presidential elections ===
Election	Affiliation	First round			Second round		
Election	Affiliation	Votes	Percentage	Position	Votes	Percentage	Position
2024	FD (endorsed by PMP, AD, PNȚ-MM)	20,089	0.22%	11th	Not qualified		

=== Mayor of Bucharest ===
Election	Affiliation	First round			Second round		
Election	Affiliation	Votes	Percentage	Position	Votes	Percentage	Position
2008	PNL	64,636	11.85%	4th	Not qualified		

== See also ==
- First Orban cabinet
- Second Orban cabinet

Political offices
Preceded by Radu Berceanu	Minister of Transport; 2007–2008	Succeeded by Radu Berceanu
Preceded by Viorica Dăncilă	Prime Minister of Romania; 2019–2020	Succeeded by Nicolae Ciucă; Acting
Preceded by Marcel Ciolacu	President of the Chamber of Deputies; 2020–2021	Succeeded by Marcel Ciolacu
Party political offices
Preceded by Raluca Turcan; Acting	Leader of the National Liberal Party; 2017–2021	Succeeded by Florin Cîțu
Position established	Leader of the Force of the Right; 2021–present	Incumbent
