= Valeriu Turcan =

Romanian journalist (born 1976)

Valeriu Turcan (Romanian pronunciation: [vaˈlerju turˈkan]; born May 22, 1976) is a Romanian political consultant and journalist. From 2007 to 2012, he served as press secretary to President Traian Băsescu, as well as being an adviser of his in the Presidency's Communications Department. He has been married to Raluca Turcan, a member of the Chamber of Deputies, since 2004. The couple have a son, Eric, born in 2007.

== Biography ==
From 1994 to 1998, he studied at the University of Bucharest's Journalism and Communication Science Faculty, specialising in journalism. In 2003, he earned an MA in International Communications from the University of Leeds. Since 2007, he has been associate lecturer at his alma mater.

From 1996 to 1999, he was political editor and reporter for Radio Contact. From 1999 to 2002, working in London, he was a producer for the Romanian-language edition of BBC World Service. From 2003 to 2005 he was a political consultant for local and parliamentary elections in Romania, as well as a public relations consultant; one of his clients was the politician Cristian Boureanu. In January 2005 he served as a state counsellor to Prime Minister Călin Popescu-Tăriceanu, and from that month until Tăriceanu fired him in March 2006 when his wife came into conflict with the National Liberal Party (PNL) leadership, he was president of the Agency for Government Strategies. From that October until March 2007, he was consultant on communications projects. In April, following the resignation of Adriana Săftoiu, he became press secretary to Băsescu, remaining his spokesman when Băsescu was shortly thereafter suspended from office, and retaining the for nearly five years. He resigned in February 2012, stating his intention to return to the private sector.
