= Trifăuți =

- Commune and village
- Location in Moldova
- Coordinates: 48°10′N 28°23′E
- Country: Moldova
- District: Soroca District

Population (2014 census)
  - Total: 934
- Time zone: UTC+2 (EET)
  - Summer (DST): UTC+3 (EEST)

Trifăuți is a village in Soroca District, Moldova.

== Notable people ==
- Leonida Țurcan
