= Alina Gorghiu =

Romanian lawyer and politician

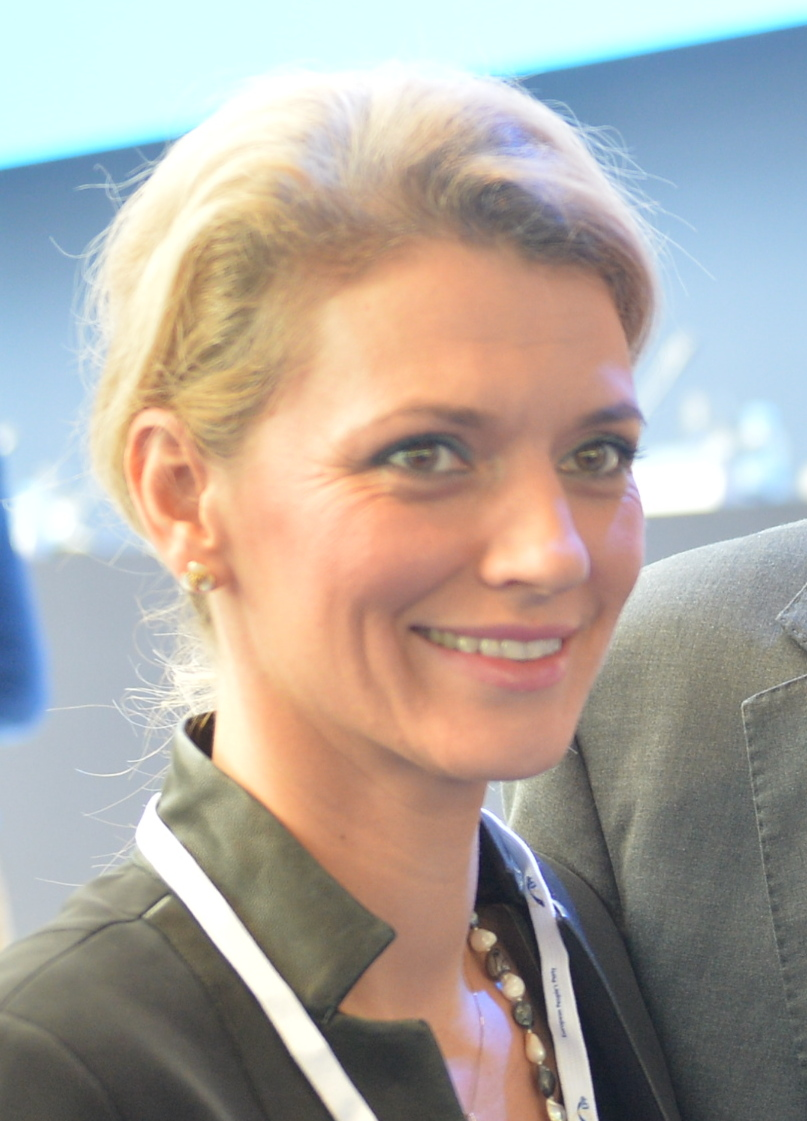
- Gorghiu in 2020

Minister of Justice
- In office 15 June 2023 – 23 December 2024
- Prime Minister: Marcel Ciolacu
- Preceded by: Cătălin Predoiu
- Succeeded by: Radu Marinescu

President of the Senate of Romania
- Acting
- In office 29 June 2022 – 13 June 2023
- Preceded by: Florin Cîțu
- Succeeded by: Nicolae Ciucă

Senator of Romania
- In office 21 December 2016 – 20 December 2024

Member of the Chamber of Deputies
- Incumbent
- Assumed office 20 December 2024
- In office 15 December 2008 – 19 December 2016

President of the National Liberal Party
- In office 18 December 2014 – 12 December 2016 Serving with Vasile Blaga (until 28 September 2016)
- Preceded by: Klaus Iohannis
- Succeeded by: Raluca Turcan (acting)

Personal details
- Born: Alina-Ștefania Gorghiu; September 16, 1978 (age 48) Tecuci, Galați County, Romania
- Party: PNL (2002–present)
- Spouse: Lucian Isar (m. 2016)
- Children: 2
- Education: Dimitrie Cantemir Christian University; National School of Administration and Political Science of Bucharest; Alexandru Ioan Cuza University
- Profession: Lawyer

Alina-Ștefania Gorghiu (Note: Romanian pronunciation: [aˈlina ʃtefaˈni.a ɡorˈɡi.u]) (born 16 September 1978) is a Romanian lawyer and politician who served as president of the National Liberal Party (PNL) from December 2014 until December 2016. She was a member of the Romanian Chamber of Deputies for Bucharest from December 2008 to December 2016. Since the latter date, she has represented Timiș County in the Romanian Senate.

== Biography ==
=== Origins and education ===
Born in Tecuci, Gorghiu completed secondary studies at Vlaicu Vodă National College in Curtea de Argeș in 1997. She then attended the Law and Administration Faculty of Dimitrie Cantemir Christian University in Bucharest, graduating in 2001. In 2002–2003, she took postgraduate courses at the University of Bucharest's Law Faculty, and from 2004 to 2008 worked on a degree at the Economics, Law and Administration Faculty of the University of Pitești. She holds a master's degree in Communications and Public Relations from the National School of Administration and Political Science of Bucharest (2007). In 2006, she began working on a doctorate in Criminal Law at the law faculty of the University of Iași; she was granted the degree in 2012.

In 2002–2003, Gorghiu interned as a lawyer in Bucharest, then working as such from June 2003 to December 2004 at Bogdan Olteanu's firm. Since 2004, she has been the principal associate at a business and management consulting firm in the national capital. From January 2005 to July 2007, she was an associate at Gorghiu, Pop and Associates, working in commercial, civil and criminal law. She then worked as an adviser to the president of the Authority for State Assets Recovery until December 2008. In 2008, she became both an arbitrator at the International Court of Arbitration and an accredited mediator, as well as beginning an affiliation with the Mediation and Arbitration Department of Titu Maiorescu University's Law Faculty. In January 2009, she returned to Gorghiu, Pop, and since that May has also been a liquidator at an insolvency agency.

=== Political career ===
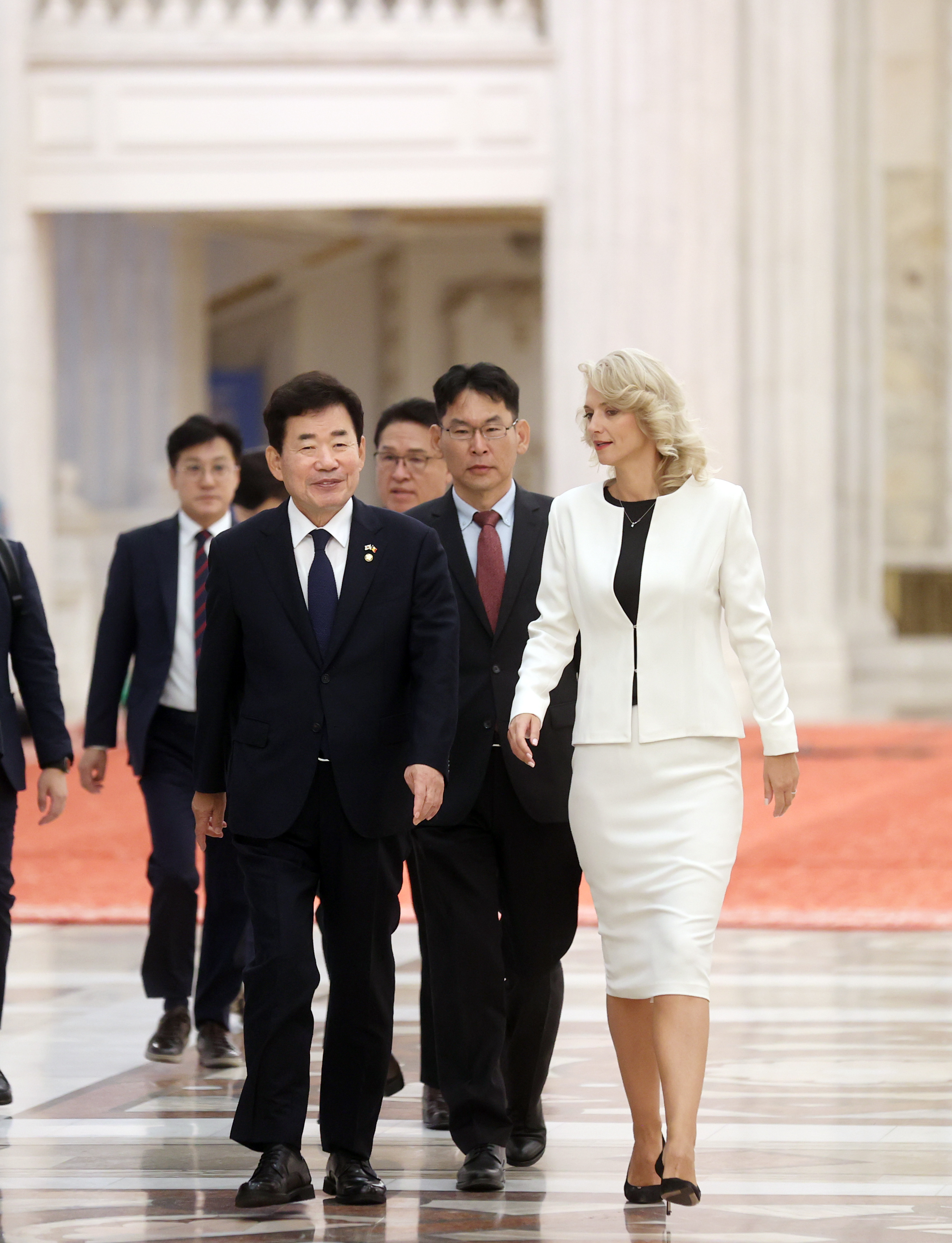
South Korean Speaker of the National Assembly Kim Jin-pyo and Gorghiu, October 2022

Gorghiu, who joined the PNL in 2002, has held two elected offices. From 2004 to 2008, she was a local councillor on the Sector 5 council in Bucharest. Then in 2008, she was elected to the Chamber of Deputies. There, she served as vice president of the committee for investigating abuses and corruption and for petitions. She was also president of the committee of enquiry for verifying the amounts of money paid by the Youth and Sport Ministry through documents signed by minister Monica Iacob-Ridzi for organising the 2009 Youth Day festival. The committee's report, the findings of which were announced by Gorghiu in July 2009, declared that Ridzi had committed embezzlement and abused public office, and sought her indictment by prosecutors. When the minister resigned several days later, Gorghiu stated she was pleased but that the action should have come some time earlier. She was one of the Chamber's vice presidents from September to December 2012.

Re-elected in 2012, she was assigned to the judiciary committee. Additionally, as a member of the joint committee tasked with revising the constitution, she advocated that the absentee ballot and a voting age of sixteen be enshrined in the document. In 2013, she joined the Parliamentary Assembly of the Council of Europe. For the second half of 2014, she was the PNL's spokeswoman. In December 2014, PNL president Klaus Iohannis, previously elected President of Romania, resigned from the party prior to taking office, as required under the constitution. Gorghiu ran to succeed him, earning his endorsement in the process. She was elected on a vote of 47 to 28, defeating Ludovic Orban and thus becoming both the party's youngest leader and the first female in the position. In addition to leading the PNL, she was also, alongside Vasile Blaga, the co-president of a revamped PNL that is scheduled to formally merge with the Democratic Liberal Party (PDL) in 2017. Following the PNL's defeat in the 2016 election, Gorghiu resigned as party leader. At the same time, she advanced to the Senate, winning a seat for Timiș County. After the 2020 election, she became one of that body's vice presidents. In June 2022, following the resignation of Florin Cîțu, she became interim Senate President, a position she held for nearly a year.

== Personal life ==
In 2016, Gorghiu secretly married Lucian Isar, a banker who briefly served as a junior minister under Victor Ponta in his first cabinet in 2012. The couple have two sons.

== Notes ==
Party political offices
Preceded by Klaus Iohannis	Co-President of the National Liberal Party; 2014–2016; Served alongside: Vasile Blaga	Succeeded by Raluca Turcan; Acting
Political offices
Preceded by Cătălin Predoiu	Romanian Minister of Justice; 2023–present	Incumbent
