= Sevil Shhaideh =

Romanian economist, civil servant and politician (born 1964)

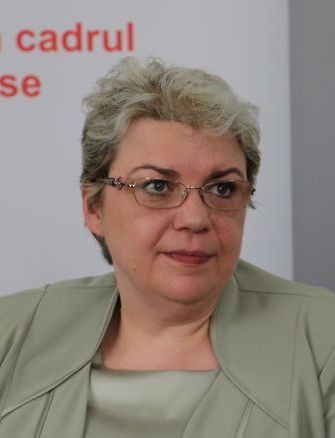
- Shhaideh in 2015

Deputy Prime Minister of Romania
- In office 29 June 2017 – 17 October 2017
- President: Klaus Iohannis
- Prime Minister: Mihai Tudose
- Preceded by: Augustin Jianu
- Succeeded by: Paul Stănescu
- In office 4 January 2017 – 16 June 2017
- President: Klaus Iohannis
- Prime Minister: Sorin Grindeanu
- Preceded by: Vasile Dîncu
- Succeeded by: Augustin Jianu

Minister of Regional Development, Public Administration and European Funds
- In office 4 January 2017 – 17 October 2017
- President: Klaus Iohannis
- Prime Minister: Sorin Grindeanu; Mihai Tudose
- Preceded by: Vasile Dîncu (Regional Development and Public Administration); Dragoș Dinu (European Funds)
- Succeeded by: Paul Stănescu

Minister of Regional Development and Public Administration
- In office 20 May 2015 – 17 November 2015
- President: Klaus Iohannis
- Prime Minister: Victor Ponta
- Preceded by: Liviu Dragnea
- Succeeded by: Vasile Dîncu

Personal details
- Born: Sevil Cambek; December 4, 1964 (age 61) Constanța, Romania
- Citizenship: Romania
- Party: Social Democratic Party
- Religion: Sunni Islam

Sevil Shhaideh (Romanian pronunciation: [ˈsevil ˈʃajde]; Dobrujan Tatar: Sevil Şayideh, née Geambec (Dobrujan Tatar: Ğambek, Crimean Tatar: Cambek); born 4 December 1964) is a Romanian economist, civil servant and politician. On 21 December 2016, she was proposed by the Social Democrats to be Prime minister of Romania, but was rejected by the president, Klaus Iohannis.

== Studies and career ==
Shhaideh was born on 4 December 1964, in Constanța, Romania. Her mother Muezel Cambek (née Karpat) is of Crimean Tatar origin and her father Saedin Cambek is of Turkish origin. In 1987 she graduated from the Academy of Economic Sciences of Bucharest, Faculty of Economic Planning and Cybernetics. She then worked in the public administration of Constanța County, becoming head of the Directorate General for Projects. In the same period, she was the coordinator of the National Union of Romanian county councils. Since 2012 she worked as secretary of state in the Ministry of Regional Development.

Between May and November 2015 Shhaideh was minister of regional development and public administration in the Social Democratic government headed by Victor Ponta, succeeding Liviu Dragnea.

On 21 December 2016 she was indicated by the PSD and ALDE parties as candidate for prime minister to the President of Romania Klaus Iohannis. Dragnea, the PSD leader, indicated that he would keep the overall political responsibility over a Shhaideh government. If she had been approved, she would have been the first woman and first Muslim to hold that position. On 27 December, Iohannis, who comes from the National Liberal Party defeated by the governing coalition, rejected the nomination, prompting Dragnea and Călin Popescu-Tăriceanu, the leader of junior coalition partner Alliance of Liberals and Democrats to accuse Iohannis of playing partisan politics and to consider his removal from the presidency.

== Personal life ==
Shhaideh family are of the Sunni Muslim faith and belonged to the long established Turkish and Tatar ethnic minorities of Romania. Her mother is the niece of the Turkish historian Kemal Karpat.

She is married to the Syrian businessman Akram Shhaideh (Arabic: أكرم شحيدة); the Romanian politician Liviu Dragnea was a witness at their wedding ceremony in 2011. According to a declaration of financial interests from July 2015, the couple own three properties in Syria, one in Latakia and two in Damascus.
