= Raluca Turcan =

Romanian politician (born 1976)

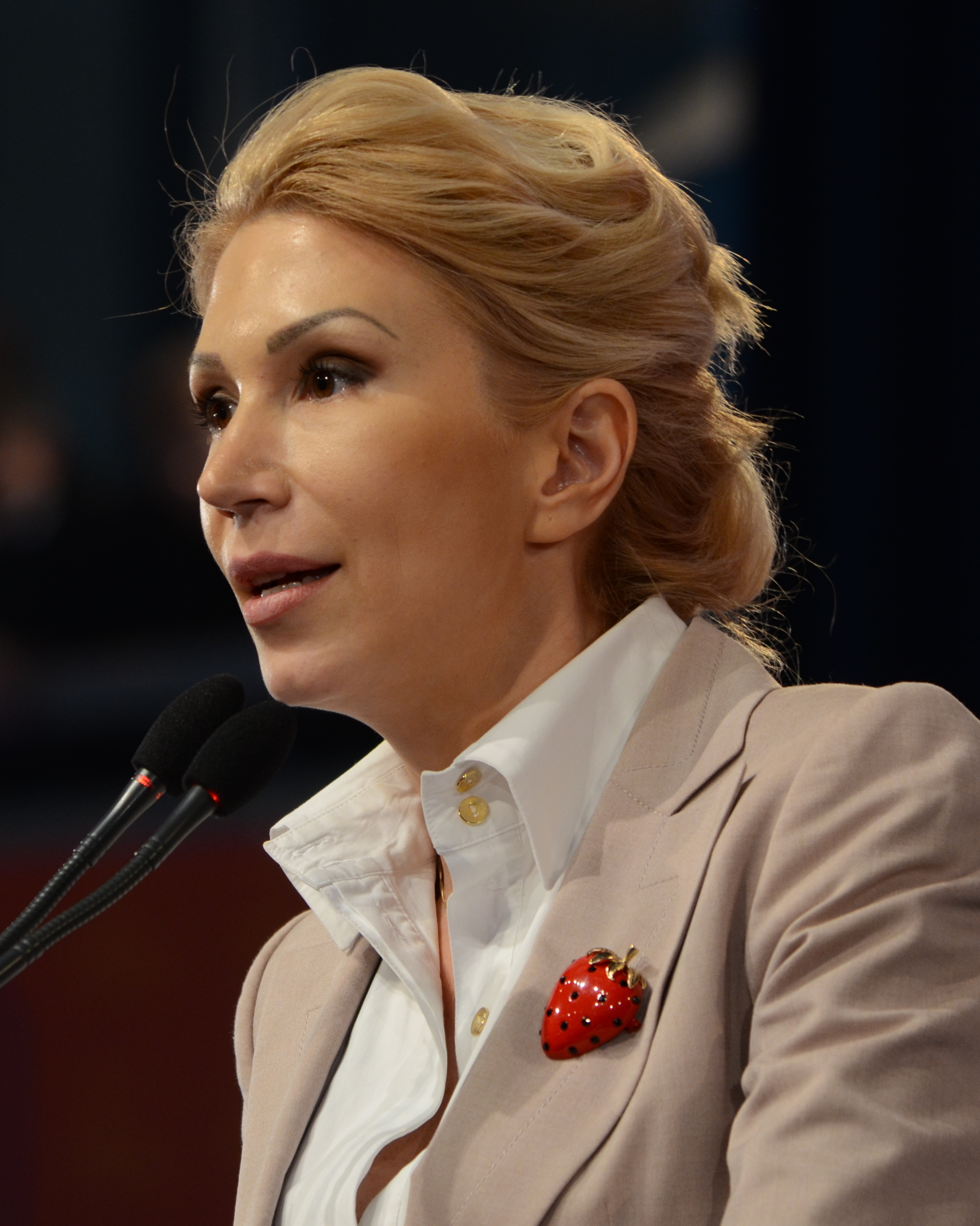
- Turcan in 2013

Deputy Prime Minister of Romania
- In office 4 November 2019 – 23 December 2020
- President: Klaus Iohannis
- Prime Minister: Ludovic Orban; Nicolae Ciucă (Acting)
- Preceded by: Paul Stănescu
- Succeeded by: Dan Barna & Kelemen Hunor

Minister of Culture
- In office 15 June 2023 – 23 December 2024
- Prime Minister: Marcel Ciolacu
- Preceded by: Lucian Romașcanu
- Succeeded by: Natalia-Elena Intotero

Minister of Labor and Social Protection
- In office 23 December 2020 – 25 November 2021
- Prime Minister: Florin Cîțu
- Preceded by: Violeta Alexandru
- Succeeded by: Marius-Constantin Budăi

President of the National Liberal Party
- (Acting)
- In office 13 December 2016 – 17 June 2017
- Preceded by: Alina Gorghiu
- Succeeded by: Ludovic Orban

Member of the Chamber of Deputies
- Incumbent
- Assumed office 17 December 2004
- Constituency: Sibiu County

Personal details
- Born: Raluca Tătărcan; 2 April 1976 (age 50) Botoșani, Romania
- Party: National Liberal Party (Before 2006; 2014–present)
- Other political affiliations: Liberal Democratic Party (2006–2007); Democratic Liberal Party (2007–2014)
- Spouse: Valeriu Turcan (2004–present)
- Children: 1
- Education: Bucharest Academy of Economic Studies; National University of Political; Studies and Public; Administration; Transilvania University

Raluca Turcan (Romanian pronunciation: [raˈluka turˈkan]; née Tătărcan (Romanian pronunciation: [tətərˈkan]); 2 April 1976) is a Romanian politician. A member of the National Liberal Party (PNL), she has been a member of the Romanian Chamber of Deputies for Sibiu County since 2004.

She has been married to Valeriu Turcan, a former adviser to Romanian President Traian Băsescu, since 2004. The couple have a son, Eric, born in 2007.

== Biography ==
She was born in Botoșani to Dumitru and Maria-Margareta Tatarcan; her father is a high school principal. She studied in the Faculty of International Economic Relations at the Bucharest Academy of Economic Studies, graduating in 1999. She was also enrolled at Moscow's Pushkin Institute from 1996 to 1999, and earned a degree in business Russian from there. In 2006, she began work on a master's degree in political marketing at the National School of Administration and Political Science of Bucharest, and that year she also began a doctorate at the Transylvania University of Braşov. She has also pursued studies in Austria and in the United States. From 1999 to 2000, she worked as a public relations consultant for Tofan Grup, an automobile tyre distributor. She was then a parliamentary expert at the Romanian Senate from 2000 to 2004, and from 2000 to 2006 was an associated professor at Transylvania University and at the Romanian-German University of Sibiu.

Turcan began her political career in 2000, as an adviser to the president of the National Council of the National Liberal Party (PNL). In 2002, she moved on to become an adviser to PNL President Theodor Stolojan, which she remained until 2004. That year, which saw her elected to Parliament, she joined the PNL's national leadership council, remaining until 2006. After being ejected from the PNL, she and fellow party dissidents Valeriu Stoica and Cristian Boureanu joined the Stolojan-founded Liberal Democratic Party (PLD), serving as its vice president from March until December 2007. At that point, the party merged with the Democratic Party and Turcan became vice president of the new formation, the PDL. She was re-elected in 2008. While in the Chamber, she has served on several committees, and has twice been president of the Committee on Culture, Arts and Mass Media (2005–2006; since 2008). At the 2012 election, she placed second in her district, but won another term through the redistribution mechanism specified by the electoral law. Following the PNL's loss in the 2016 election and the resignation of its president Alina Gorghiu, Turcan served as interim party leader, until the election of Ludovic Orban on a permanent basis. In May 2019, following the vacancy left by the incarceration of Liviu Dragnea, she ran for Chamber President, losing to Marcel Ciolacu of the Social Democratic Party (PSD). She was Deputy Prime Minister of Romania from November 2019 to December 2020 and Minister of Labour and Social Protection from December 2020 to November 2021.

== Controversies ==
Turcan has worked with civil society groups focusing on mass media, free expression, human rights and health. She has co-authored an English-Russian-Romanian dictionary of economic terms, as well as the book Integrare şi politică fiscală europeană ("Integration and European Fiscal Policy"). Additionally, she has published studies on European integration and public relations.

During her career in politics, Turcan has been the subject of some controversy. After Călin Popescu-Tăriceanu became PNL President and Prime Minister of Romania in 2004, her public criticisms of the party began to increase, so that in July 2006, the party gave her a warning, to which she responded that she would continue making similar statements. She kept her word, and the party expelled her that September. Continuing to attack Tăriceanu, she was at the forefront of a group of PD-L deputies who in March 2008 asked prosecutors to investigate the prime minister for abuse of office and corruption in his attempts to impose an automobile tax (he has links to the industry), and, a year later, before Tăriceanu lost the PNL presidency, declared a united right-wing party encompassing the PD-L and the PNL could be formed if he and a few people around him left the PNL. Shortly after her expulsion, she complained of "a trio monopolising the party, made up of Tăriceanu, Olteanu and Orban, which has practically confiscated it and eliminates anyone who dares share a point of view different from theirs". By contrast, she has been a public supporter of Băsescu, whom she notes shares the PD-L's objectives, and whose suspension she called "a serious abuse". She also predicted that then-PNL leader Crin Antonescu would lose to Băsescu at the 2009 election and noted the party risked marginalisation if it continued its anti-Băsescu strategy. Turcan supports modifying the Constitution in order to enhance presidential powers to those found in a consolidated semi-presidential system.

Party political offices
Preceded by Alina Gorghiu	President of the National Liberal Party; Acting (2016–2017)	Succeeded by Ludovic Orban
