= Viorica Țurcanu =

Romanian fencer

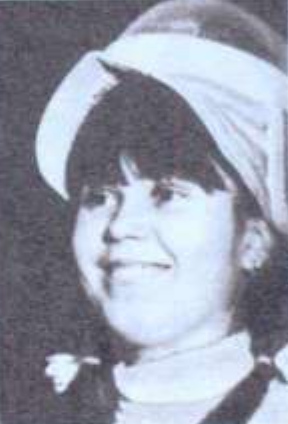

Personal information
- Born: 26 April 1954 (age 72) Bucharest, Romania

Sport
- Sport: Fencing

Achievements and titles
- World finals: Camp mondiale 1978

Viorica Țurcanu (born 26 April 1954) is a Romanian fencer. She competed in the women's team foil event at the 1980 Summer Olympics.
