= Leonida Țurcan =

Bessarabian politician

Leonida Ţurcan

Member of the Moldovan Parliament
- In office 1917 – 27 November 1918

Personal details
- Born: Trifăuţi

Leonida Ţurcan (born 1894 in Trifăuţi) was a Bessarabian politician.

She served as Member of the Moldovan Parliament (1917–1918).

== Gallery ==
Moldovan stamp, 1998

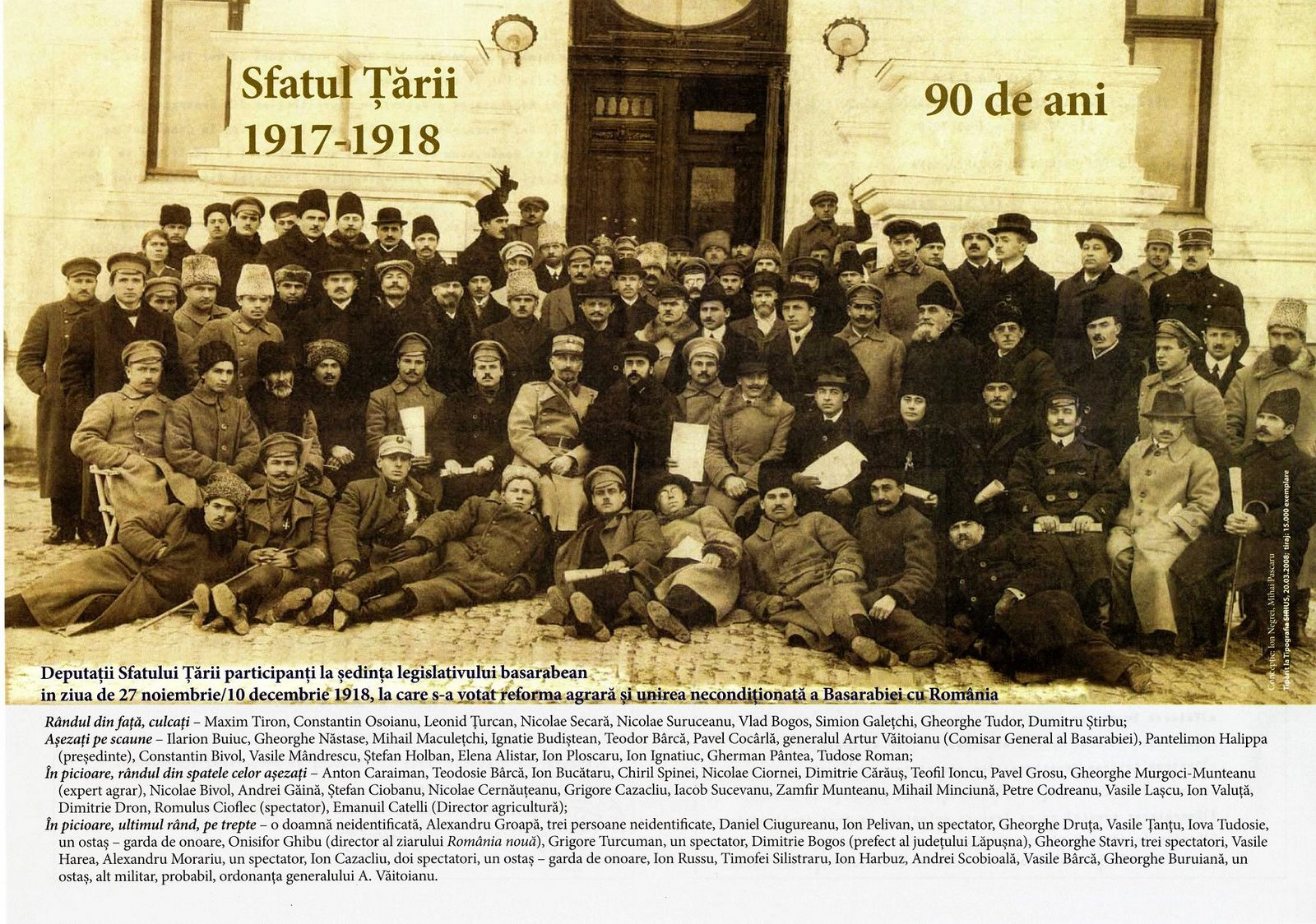
Sfatul Țării Palace, 10 December 1918

== Bibliography ==
- Gheorghe E. Cojocaru, Sfatul Țării: itinerar, Civitas, Chişinău, 1998, ISBN 9975-936-20-2
- Mihai Taşcă, Sfatul Țării şi actualele autorităţi locale, "Timpul de dimineaţă", no. 114 (849), June 27, 2008 (page 16)
