= Radu Berceanu =

Romanian engineer and politician

Minister of Transport and Infrastructure
- In office 22 December 2008 – 3 September 2010
- Prime Minister: Emil Boc
- Preceded by: Ludovic Orban
- Succeeded by: Anca Boagiu
- In office 22 August 2006 – 5 April 2007
- Prime Minister: Călin Popescu-Tăriceanu
- Preceded by: Gheorghe Dobre
- Succeeded by: Ludovic Orban

Minister of Agriculture Acting
- In office 1 October 2009 – 23 December 2009
- Prime Minister: Emil Boc
- Preceded by: Ilie Sârbu
- Succeeded by: Mihai Dumitru

Minister of Industry and Commerce
- In office 17 April 1998 – 28 November 2000
- Prime Minister: Radu Vasile; Mugur Isărescu
- Preceded by: Mircea Ciumara
- Succeeded by: Dan Ioan Popescu

Personal details
- Born: 5 March 1953 (age 73) Râmnicu Vâlcea, Romania
- Party: Democratic Liberal Party (PDL) (to 2014)
- Other political affiliations: Democratic Liberal Party (PDL) (2007-2014); Democratic Party (1993-2007); National Salvation Front (1990-1993); Romanian Communist Party (before 1989)
- Spouse: Mihaela-Marinela Berceanu
- Children: Victor (b. 1981); Andrei (b. 1984)
- Education: Politehnica University of Bucharest
- Profession: Engineer

Radu Mircea Berceanu (Romanian pronunciation: [ˈradu berˈt͡ʃe̯anu]; born 5 March 1953) is a Romanian engineer and politician. A former member of the Democratic Liberal Party (PD-L), he was a member of the Romanian Chamber of Deputies for Dolj County from 1990 to 2004 and sat in the Romanian Senate from 2004 to 2012 (except for the period of April–December 2008), representing the same county. In the Radu Vasile and Mugur Isărescu cabinets, he was Minister of Industry and Commerce from 1998 to 2000; in the first Călin Popescu-Tăriceanu cabinet, he was Minister of Transport, Construction and Tourism from 2006 to 2007; and in the Emil Boc cabinet, he was Minister of Transport and Infrastructure from December 2008 to September 2010. From October to December 2009, he was also acting Minister of Agriculture after a political crisis that led to the Social Democratic Party’s withdrawal from government.

In 1978, he married Mihaela-Marinela Bădîrcea (b. 1954). The couple have two sons, Victor (b. 1981) and Andrei (b. 1984).

== Biography ==
He was born in Râmnicu Vâlcea; his father was an aviator, and his mother, a nurse. After completing secondary studies there in 1972 at Vasile Roaită Theoretical High School (now Mircea cel Bătrân), he enrolled at the Polytehnic Institute of Bucharest. He studied aerospace design and graduated in 1978. He also took courses on parliamentarism in Canada in 1990 and on democratic institutions in the United States in 1991. After university, Berceanu worked as an engineer in Craiova from 1978 to 1981 at a flight testing centre. From 1984 to 1989 he worked as an engineer at the city's airplane factory. Between 1980 and 1989, he taught at an industrial high school in Craiova.

He also took up scale modeling; he has won prizes for his ship and aircraft models. During the 1980s, he set up an amateur scale modeling circle for students, which was attended by future literary critic Angelo Mitchievici. According to Mitchievici's memoir of life under the communist regime, these circumstances allowed Berceanu to attend workshops in various Eastern Bloc countries, "and he probably thus had the opportunity to engage in some bişniţă [roughly, grey market transactions]."

After the Romanian Revolution of 1989, Berceanu entered politics. He was Dolj County’s vice president of the Council of the National Salvation Front in December 1989-January 1990. From February to May 1990, he was president of his county's Provisional Council of National Unity and belonged to the main council in Bucharest. From its founding in February 1990 to his resignation in 2012 to make way for younger leadership, he headed the Dolj County PD-L chapter and that of its predecessor, the Democratic Party (PD), of which he was a founding member. In 2005, he militated in favor of preserving the PD’s social-democratic orientation, losing out to a Christian Democratic faction. In the May 1990 election, he won a seat in the chamber. He did so again in 1992, 1996 and 2000. While there, he served as the body's vice president at various times between 1992 and 2004. From his election in 2004 to April 2008, he sat in the Senate and was vice president there as well. He then resigned to run in the June local election for president of the Dolj County Council and while gaining a seat as a county councillor was defeated on a 42–33.8 margin by a Social Democratic candidate. At the November 2008 parliamentary election, Berceanu regained his Senate seat and was named transport minister the following month. From October 2009, when the Social Democrats left the cabinet because of a political crisis, to that December, when a new cabinet was approved, he was also the acting agriculture minister.

After re-assuming ministerial office in 2008, Berceanu announced motorway construction as his priority (despite serious budget cuts brought about by the 2008 financial crisis), although acknowledging the poor state of national roads and the state railway Căile Ferate Române (CFR), as well as the need to focus on airports (such as the Braşov Airport currently under construction). He vowed to complete the A2 motorway by 2011 (notwithstanding a 2006 promise to complete it by summer 2008), and a Bucharest-Braşov motorway as well as a Bucharest-Calafat one (ending at the Calafat-Vidin Bridge) by 2014. This emphasis meant plans for twelve express roads had to be scrapped. Also planned by him is an hourly train from Gara de Nord to Otopeni, with a bus transfer to the nearby airport. He has been a strong critic of his predecessor Ludovic Orban, whom he accused of spending substantial amounts of money on studies for express roads, "not one metre" of which was built under Orban (and which, as a motorway advocate, he derided as being outdated). He has announced plans for major restructuring at the CFR, including a potential 12,000 layoffs, for which he again blamed the previous government. Orban fired back, labelling the 2009 transport budget a "cruel mockery" from an infrastructure development standpoint, accusing Berceanu of blocking the Calafat-Vidin project and of "not lifting a finger" on the Craiova-Piteşti express road, and stating his "personal feeling" that Berceanu's days as minister were numbered. He was dismissed a year and a half later, following a cabinet reshuffle. In April 2012, Berceanu announced his decision to retire from politics, and he did not run at the December election.

Berceanu's wealth has drawn attention: in 2008, his declared assets included bank accounts worth over €800,000, three apartments (including one in Spain), a Toyota RAV4 and a Mercedes-Benz W220. In 2006, he made public his 300-page Securitate file, revealing that the communist secret police agency had harassed and threatened him and his wife in the autumn of 1989 for allegedly intending to flee the country using a hang glider he had built. He noted having given "about two ink cartridges' worth of declarations", that he was almost excluded from the Romanian Communist Party in 1981, and that, despite being the first party member in his family, he was known for his anti-regime position and never informed on his colleagues.

In 2000, French President Jacques Chirac conferred the rank of Chevalier of the Ordre national du Mérite upon Berceanu. Within his party, he has been secretary, vice president for organisational affairs, and vice president. He has also served as a delegate from the Romanian Parliament to the Council of Europe (1996–1998, 2000–2006, 2007–2008).
