= Romeo V. Turcan =

Aalborg University faculty

- Born: 24 April 1970 (age 56); Drochia, Moldavian SSR
- Occupation: Professor
- Employer: Aalborg University

Romeo V. Turcan (born 24 April 1970) is a professor at Aalborg University Business School, Clare Hall Life Member, and Adjunct Professor at Trinity Business School. His research interests include emergence, legitimation and institutionalization of newness and theory building across diverse disciplines and contexts.

== Education and career ==
Turcan holds a degree in mechanical engineering from the Air Force Engineering Military Academy, Riga, Latvia (1992) and in Philology from the Department of Post-University Studies, Moldova State University, Chișinău, Moldova (1995). In 2000, he received his MSc in International Marketing from the Department of Marketing, University of Strathclyde, Glasgow, United Kingdom; and in 2006, he received his PhD in International Entrepreneurship from the Hunter Centre for Entrepreneurship, University of Strathclyde.

Prior to commencing his academic career, Turcan worked in a range of posts involving public policy intervention in restructuring, rationalizing and modernizing business and public sectors such as power, oil, military high-tech, management consulting, information and communications technology (ICT) and higher education. In addition, he is the co-founder and former Executive Director of the International Association of Business and Parliament – Moldova.

He has also been a member of various boards including the board of Enterprise and Parliamentary Dialogue International, London, UK (2013-2019) and the board of The International Society of Markets and Development (2019-). He is chairman of the Organization of Moldovans in Denmark.

He has been project coordinator for ERASMUS + Strategic Partnership projects (2019-2023; 2024-2027) and the H2020 Marie S. Curie project (2020-2024). In addition, he is the Founder and Coordinator of the Theory Building Research Program (2012-).

== Honors ==
Since 2012, Turcan has been the main applicant and coordinator of four EU funded projects, incl., Marie S. Curie ITN, with a total value of more than 7.3 mil EUR:

- "Legitimation of Newness and Its Impact on EU Agenda for Change", Marie S. Curie project (2020-2023, main applicant and coordinator)
- "International Entrepreneurship Network for PhD and PhD Supervisor Training", Strategic Partnership (Erasmus+) project (2019-2022, main applicant and coordinator)
- "PBLMD-TOPUP", ERASMUS+ Learning Mobility of Individuals (2017-2018, main applicant and coordinator)
- "Introducing Problem Based Learning in Moldova: Toward Enhancing Students’ Competitiveness and Employability", ERASMUS+ Capacity Building national project (2015-2019, main applicant and coordinator)
- "Enhancing University Autonomy in Moldova", ERASMUS+ Capacity Building structural project (2012-2015, main applicant and coordinator)

== Publications ==
- Turcan, Romeo V.; Reilly, John E., eds. (2020). Populism and Higher Education Curriculum Development: Problem Based Learning as a Mitigating Response (PDF). doi:10.1007/978-3-030-47376-1. ISBN 978-3-030-47375-4. S2CID 197737371.
- Turcan, Romeo V.; Fraser, Norman M., eds. (2018). The Palgrave Handbook of Multidisciplinary Perspectives on Entrepreneurship. doi:10.1007/978-3-319-91611-8. ISBN 978-3-319-91610-1.
- Turcan, Romeo V.; Reilly, John E.; Bugaian, Larisa, eds. (2016). (Re)Discovering University Autonomy. Palgrave Macmillan. pp. 239–249. doi:10.1057/9781137388728. ISBN 978-1-349-55212-2.
- Dholakia, Nikhilesh; Turcan, Romeo V. (2014). Toward a Metatheory of Economic Bubbles. doi:10.1057/9781137361790. ISBN 978-1-349-47477-6.
- Fraser, N. M. and Turcan, R. V. (2025). Reconstructing the Social Construction of Reality. British Journal of Sociology, 76(3), 657-662. https://doi.org/10.1111/1468-4446.13190
