= 2012 Romanian constitutional crisis =

A major constitutional crisis erupted in Romania in 2012 after a dispute between President Traian Băsescu and Prime Minister Victor Ponta. A dispute arose between the two regarding the representation of Romania to the European Council reunion of June 28, 2012. The dispute degenerated in civil disobedience and conflicting views between political parties. On 12 December 2012, Băsescu and Ponta signed an agreement on institutional cohabitation, effectively ending the crisis.

== Background ==
President Traian Băsescu and Prime Minister Victor Ponta became locked in a constitutional judicial conflict over Romania's representation at the June 28, 2012 meeting of the European Council. President Traian Băsescu submitted a complaint to Romania's Constitutional Court in point of the conflict with Government concerning the representation on the European Council. Ponta declared to the Romanian press agency Mediafax that misconception claimed by President Băsescu to the Constitutional Court is between Presidency and Parliament, and Court judges can only determine the existence of a conflict, that can not be solved only by amending the Constitution.

Parliament plenary adopted on June 12, 2012, with 249 votes in favor, 30 against and two abstentions, a political declaration recommending that at European Council meeting on June 28 Romania to be represented by Premier Victor Ponta, not by President Traian Băsescu. That decision triggered a fierce conflict between the two Palaces. As of 2012, President Traian Băsescu sent to Premier Victor Ponta a letter which drew attention that participation in the European Council without a mandate from the President legally equalizes with ownership of a constitutional prerogatives of the President. At a press conference, Ponta broke the letter, ironically replying this gesture.

On June 27, Constitutional Court decides that the President is required to attend the European Council in Brussels. Ponta respond in a way that nobody expected. Government takes in authority the Official Monitor, delaying publication of the Constitutional Court decision, regarding participation in European Council and making the presence of Victor Ponta in Brussels to be legal.

=== Plagiarism controversy ===
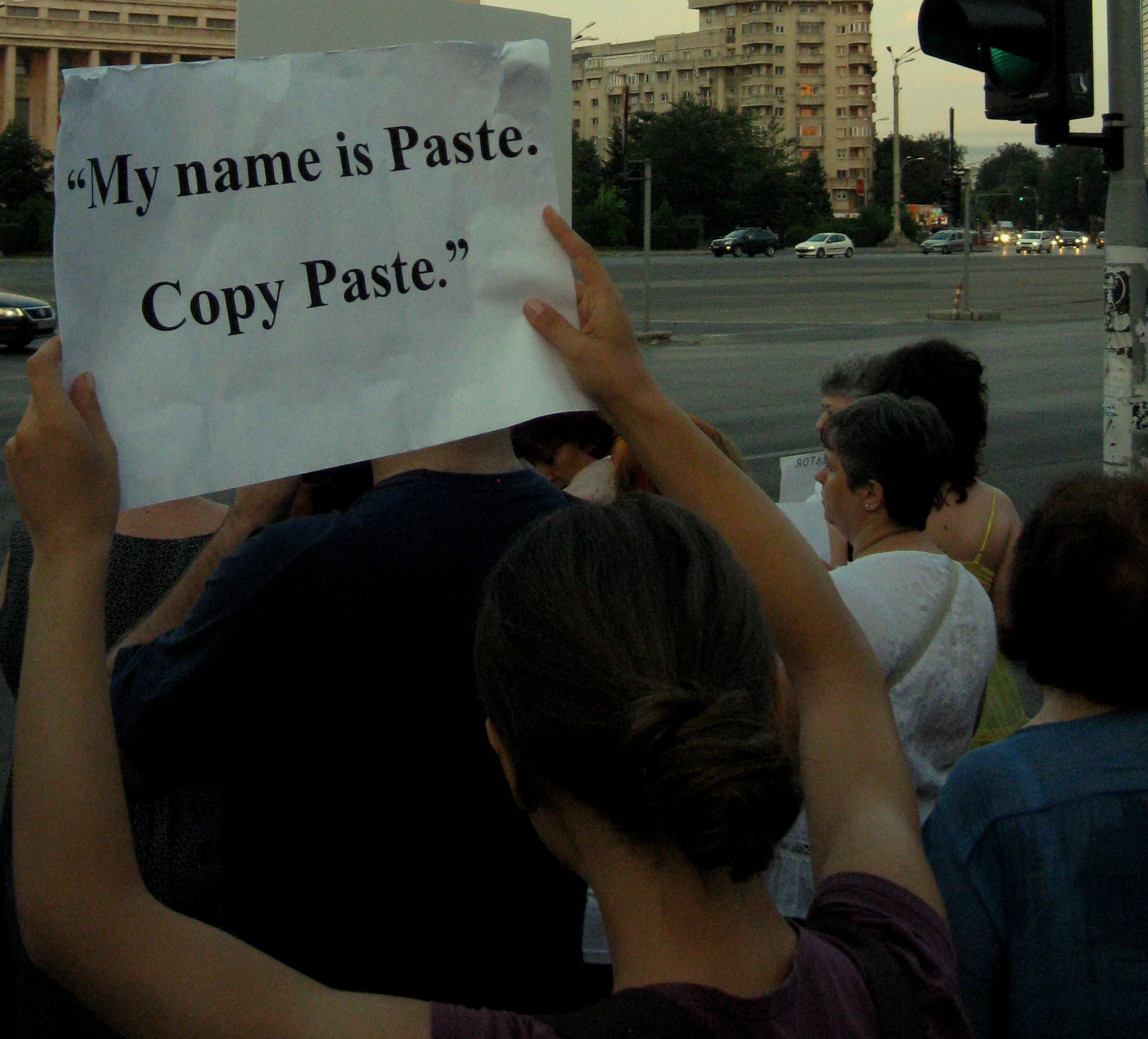
Protest in Victory Square, Bucharest against Ponta Cabinet

Victor Ponta obtained his PhD in law from the University of Bucharest, in July 2003, with a thesis entitled "International Criminal Court". Scientific advisor of this piece of work was Adrian Năstase, then Prime Minister in office, who serves a 1-year sentence in prison since 2012.

On June 18, 2012, online edition of Nature magazine published the news that Victor Ponta, "Prime Minister of Romania, has been accused of copying large sections of his 2003 PhD thesis in law from previous publications, without proper reference". The charge was made on the basis of documents compiled by an anonymous whistleblower. "Ponta obtained his doctorate from the University of Bucharest while he was Secretary of State in Năstase I Cabinet, who was his doctoral thesis supervisor", the author writes.

Concomitantly, imputation of plagiarism was also published by German newspaper Frankfurter Allgemeine Zeitung. Karl Peter Schwarz, a journalist from the newspaper and author of the inquiry published by him, commented on the subject in an interview on June 20, 2012, in which showed that the case would be worse than plagiarists politicians in Germany and Hungary, whereas the latter "didn't copy whole pages of the thesis, as he did". News from Nature, about plagiarism, were resumed by Romanian and international press, in România Liberă, Hotnews.ro, Financial Times Deutschland, The Guardian, weekly Die Zeit, Il Messaggero (Italy), El Mundo (Spain), The Hindu (India), Le Monde, BBC.

A document published by TVR presents the passages of thesis copied in parallel with source texts. It appears that much of the work was copied, word for word, from the following works:

- Diaconu, D.: International Criminal Court, History and Reality, All Beck Publishing House, 1999;
- Crețu, V.: International Criminal Law, Tempus Publishing House, 1996;
- Diaconu, I.: The International Criminal Court: A New Stage, Nicolae Titulescu Romanian Inst. International Studies, 2002;
- Duculescu, V.: preface to the work of D. Diaconu, International Criminal Court, History and Reality.

Members of the National Council for the Recognition of Degrees, Diplomas and Certificates decided, after examining the thesis of PM Ponta, that he had plagiarized 85 pages of the work, although in the press had conveyed numbers from 30 to about 130 pages plagiarized from these works.

A detailed analysis in parallel of the texts conducted by journalists from România Liberă indicated not only a taking over of the informative parts, but also of the authors' personal assessments, of the rhetorical questions put by them, of the references to older texts of the same author, and orthography mistakes. The doctoral thesis was subsequently published in book form, with a preface signed by even I. Diaconu (author of one of the three plagiarized works), having Daniela Coman as co-author. Other sources indicate author's preface as Adrian Năstase.

On the other hand, National Ethics Council decided on July 18, 2012, that Ponta didn't plagiarize.

(...) council was regenerated by former interim minister Liviu Pop, so that the result of an analysis simulation of the work can be controlled.

— Cristina Olivia Moldovan, Evenimentul Zilei

On July 20, 2012, Ethics Committee of the University of Bucharest decided that Victor Ponta deliberately plagiarized, finding passages copied on 115 pages of the 297 (namely the thesis excluding Năstase's preface and appendices). On the same day, Nature magazine related about contradictory verdicts of Government Ethics Commission and Ethics Committee of the university.

=== Diesel fuel dossier ===
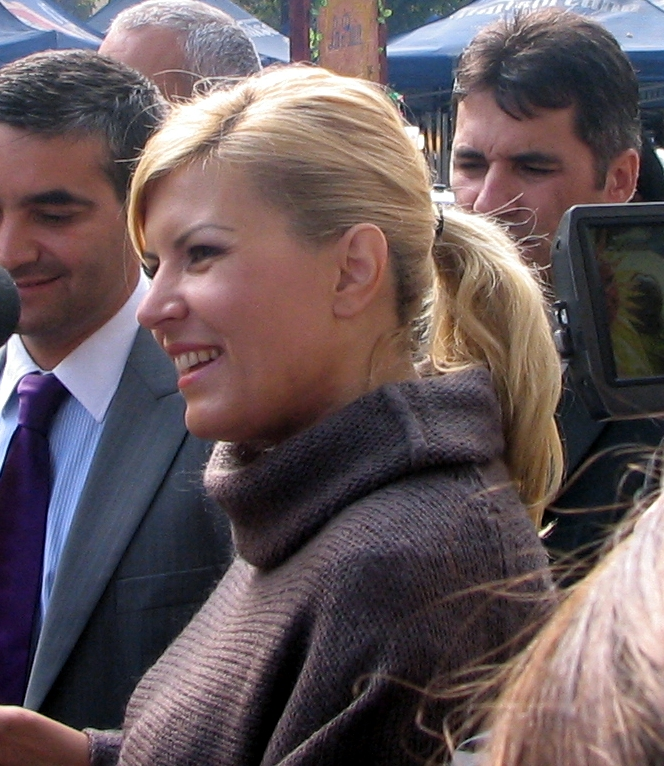
Elena Udrea was intercepted four times in the dossier.

President Traian Băsescu and former Minister of Regional Development and Tourism, Elena Udrea, were intercepted in the dossier of former head of National Agency for Fiscal Administration, Sorin Blejnar. President Băsescu spoke on the phone with Blejnar about Rompetrol problem, but also about the situation of a company that has contracts with the State. Elena Udrea also had four discussions with Blejnar, in that they fixed appointments.

The phone of former head of the IRS was heard by prosecutors in the case of diesel fuel imports in Brașov, in that the former head of NAFA was indicted by DIICOT prosecutors for favoring the offender.

Sorin Blejnar called in September 2010 the President Traian Băsescu, to inform him about a construction company, which has won numerous contracts with the State and which has debts. The company belongs to some PDL friends. Likewise, President demanded explanations about Rompetrol and told Blejnar to find solutions together with the Minister of Justice.

The Presidential Administration recognized the interceptions in DIICOT dossier. According to the Presidency, talks between President Băsescu and former head of NAFA focused on the recovery of Rompetrol company's debts to the State, given that combating tax evasion and collection of receivables from the state budget made the object of a CSAT decision of 28 June 2010.

The judicial inspection of the Superior Council of Magistracy initiated an investigation to see if the DIICOT case prosecutor in the Dossier "Diesel fuel" complied with the procedure when introduced interceptions with President Traian Băsescu in the dossier devoid of classifying them and to investigate a possible leak from Brașov Court.

==== Communique issued by the Presidential Administration ====
Regarding to the appearance in the media of the interception of telephone conversations between the President of Romania, Mr. Traian Băsescu, and former president of the National Agency for Fiscal Administration, Sorin Blejnar, Presidential Administration made the following comments:

(1) – is about three wiretaps of Mr. President Traian Băsescu and Sorin Blejnar;
(2) – discussions focused on debts recovery of Rompetrol company that has towards the Romanian state given that given that combating tax evasion and collection of receivables from the state budget made the object of a Supreme Council of National Defence decision of 28 June 2010, and President of Romania is also the chairman of CSAT;
(3) – Rompetrol debt recovery to the Romanian state was also the subject of discussion at the highest level between the President of Romania, Mr. Traian Băsescu, and President of Kazakhstan, Mr. Nursultan Nazarbayev, during the two visits that the President has done in Astana (Kazakhstan) in 2010 (2 to 3 March 2010 respectively, 1 to 2 December 2010), since the Rompetrol company was acquired by KazMunayGas company, owned by Kazakhstan;
(4) – a honest reading of discussions indicates that Mr. President Traian Băsescu discussed with Mr. Sorin Blejnar about Rompetrol company debts recovery to the Romanian state.

— How Băsescu explains DIICOT interceptions in Sorin Blejnar's dossier, România TV

=== SCM scandal ===
On January 4, 2013, there were held elections for the offices of President and vice-president of the Superior Council of Magistracy. The prosecutor Oana Schmidt Hăineală was chosen as president of the SCM, after being heard by the members of SCM, with his rival, the judge Mircea Aron. The conduct of elections triggered disputes and controversies between Superior Council of Magistracy and National Union of Judges in Romania, that roughly criticized the elections, whereon it considers untransparent and unprofessional. Likewise, the Magistrates Association in Romania expressed dissatisfaction with the appointment of Oana Hăineală as head of the SCM.

As a release of the situation, the department for judges of the Superior Council of Magistracy demanded the resignation of honor of Oana Schmidt Hăineală as president of SCM and, simultaneously, asked judges Alina Ghica and Cristi Danileț to relinquish the nomination for vice-president of the council.

=== Corruption scandal ===
In a report on justice in Romania, drawn up by the European Commission on January 30, 2013, appear three ministers investigated for corruption. According to a European official, two of ministers referred to in the CVM report are Liviu Dragnea and Varujan Vosganian. According to Prime Minister Victor Ponta, the third one is Relu Fenechiu. Dragnea is being investigated for alleged involvement in fraud in the referendum regarding the dismissal of President Traian Băsescu. Fenechiu was prosecuted, in the summer of 2012, in Transformer dossier, in which he's charged with complicity in abuse of office.

Likewise, the European Commission Report on the Cooperation and Verification Mechanism records that there's intimidation and harassment against individuals in state institutions, like National Integrity Agency, Constitutional Court, High Court of Cassation and Superior Council of Magistracy. "The judicial independence doesn't exist", affirmed Mark Gray, European Commission spokesman.

== Beginning of crisis ==
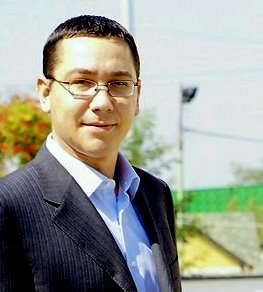
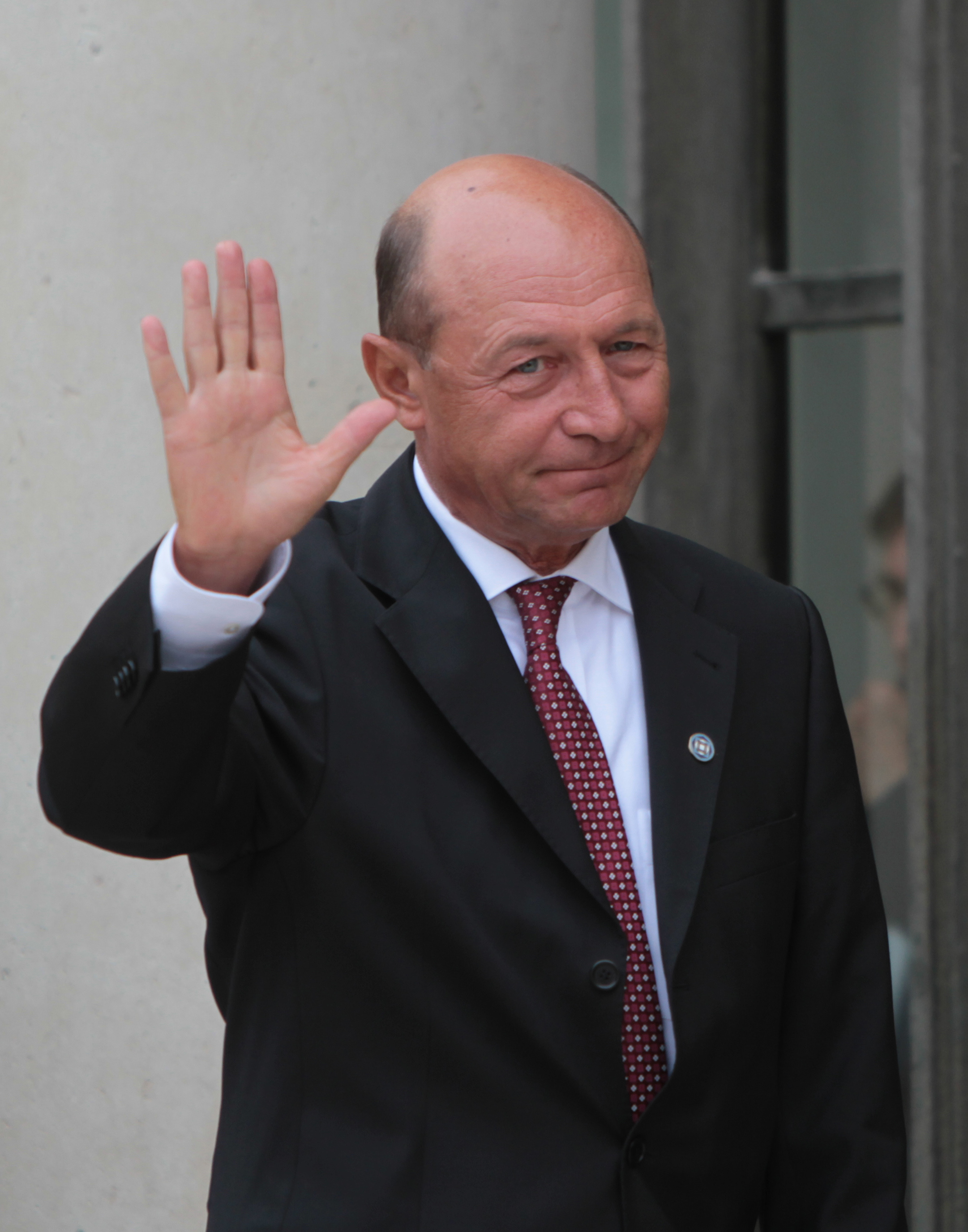
Victor Ponta (left) and Traian Băsescu (right)

Traian Băsescu's troubles began on June 18. Hidroelectrica, a state-owned energy company announced that it was insolvent. It was a move that Ponta hit the "smart guys", which have signed contracts with all governments (right- or left-wing) to buy cheap energy from Hidroelectrica. On the same day, Victor Ponta became embroiled in a plagiarism scandal: Nature magazine claimed that the Premier copied his dissertation in 2003.

On June 20, former PSD leader and premier and Ponta's political mentor Adrian Năstase was sentenced to two years of imprisonment after conviction in a corruption trial due to his alleged involvement in the dossier "Quality Trophy". The same evening, as police arrived at his home to escort him to prison, Năstase shot himself in an apparent suicide attempt and was transported to Floreasca Hospital. A week later, Adrian Năstase was transferred to Rahova Prison Hospital. On June 25, the Romanian Senate decided to alter the functioning of the Constitutional Court law, such that the court will not be able to rule on Parliament decisions, thus facilitating the procedure for suspension of the President. In the following days, the Chamber of Deputies approved the referendum law amendment, which established that the President can be dismissed easily, only half the votes of those who come to the polls. Until that point, the law stipulated that the President is dismissed only if the proposal was passed by majority of voters registered on electoral lists. On June 27, the Pure uninominal law, initiated by Victor Ponta and Crin Antonescu, is declared unconstitutional. On the same day, PDL attack to the Constitutional Court the referendum law and the Constitutional Court Law amending.

In press occurs rumors about filing a penal complaint at Parquet against Victor Ponta by Traian Băsescu, as the Prime Minister to be, then suspended from office. President denies this version, but accuses Ponta that represents illegitimate Romania in Brussels. National Council for Titles, Diplomas and Certificates establishes that Victor Ponta plagiarized in his PhD thesis. Council claims that 85 pages are copied and called for the title of doctor withdrawal. But, before the verdict, Interim Minister of Education, Liviu Pop, dissolved the National Council for Titles, Diplomas and Certificates, such that the decision was void.

On July 3, the Romanian Parliament, at proposal of majority represented by USL, vote dismissal of President of the Senate, PDL leader Vasile Blaga, President of the Chamber of Deputies, PDL member Roberta Anastase and Ombudsman. Through an Emergency Ordinance, government restricts the attributions of the Constitutional Court, restoring them to the 2010 status quo.

== President's suspension ==
Băsescu was suspended as President of Romania, by Parliament, with 256 votes in favor and 114 against. There were two abstentions. After announcing the results, Parliament proposed that the presidential impeachment referendum to be held on July 29, 2012, proposal approved by the plenary with 242 votes in favor. Suspended president notified the Constitutional Court, calling for a constitutional legal conflict between president and Parliament. "I do not defend the seat, but I want to defend the office", President explained. Therewith, he reiterated accusations against USL and its leaders, accusing them of lying and wanted to subordinate the justice. "If I return as president it will still be impossible for thieves and impostors from politics to negotiate with me their calmness. I think that Romanians do not want the peace during Iliescu government. I can not guarantee that I will continue to be a strong nut for those who believe that Romania can go forward with a justice that protects thieves", Băsescu said.

He added that "suspender's great argument is that I haven't popularity", and if he will be reappointed at referendum and he will find Victor Ponta in office he will never entrust the prime minister function.

On the other hand, USL leaders Crin Antonescu and Victor Ponta ensured that there will be no pressure for justice and for other state institutions.

Victor Ponta said that during this period of political crisis his family received threats, having to resort to state institutions for protection.

On July 9, the Constitutional Court ascertained President Băsescu's suspension and confirmed Crin Antonescu as Interim President. Therewith, Constitutional Court rejected complaints formulated by Vasile Blaga and Roberta Anastase, supported by PDL, regarding removal from office of President of the Senate, respectively President of the Chamber of Deputies.

On July 19, USL laid down, at the Office of the High Court of Cassation and Justice, a penal complaint against suspended President Traian Băsescu and other 14 people, for "spreading false information, for defamation of the country and the nation and for endangering safety of the national economy and currency stability".

=== Motives invoked for suspension ===
1. The President usurped the role of prime minister and substituted him in the constitutional attributions of the Government.
2. The President repeatedly violated fundamental rights and freedoms of citizens provided in the Constitution.
3. The President repeatedly violated the principle of separation of powers and judicial independence.
4. The President has initiated an unconstitutional project to revise the Constitution and violated the constitutional review procedure provided by the fundamental law.
5. The President abetted to breach of the Constitutional Court decisions and made direct pressure on the judges of the Court, making them "visits" before important decisions.
6. The President systematically violated the principle of political non-possession of the person who serves as presidential function and abandoned his constitutional role of mediator in the state and society.
7. The President seriously violated the Constitution and the fundamental principle of representative democracy, when he said he would not appoint a Prime Minister of the USL, even if this party will get absolute majority in Parliament.
- Source: Gândul.info

== July 29 referendum ==
A referendum on impeaching President Traian Băsescu was held in Romania on July 29, 2012. The referendum was required after Parliament voted in favour of impeaching Băsescu on July 6, and had to take place within a month.

Results of the 2012 Romanian presidential impeachment referendum

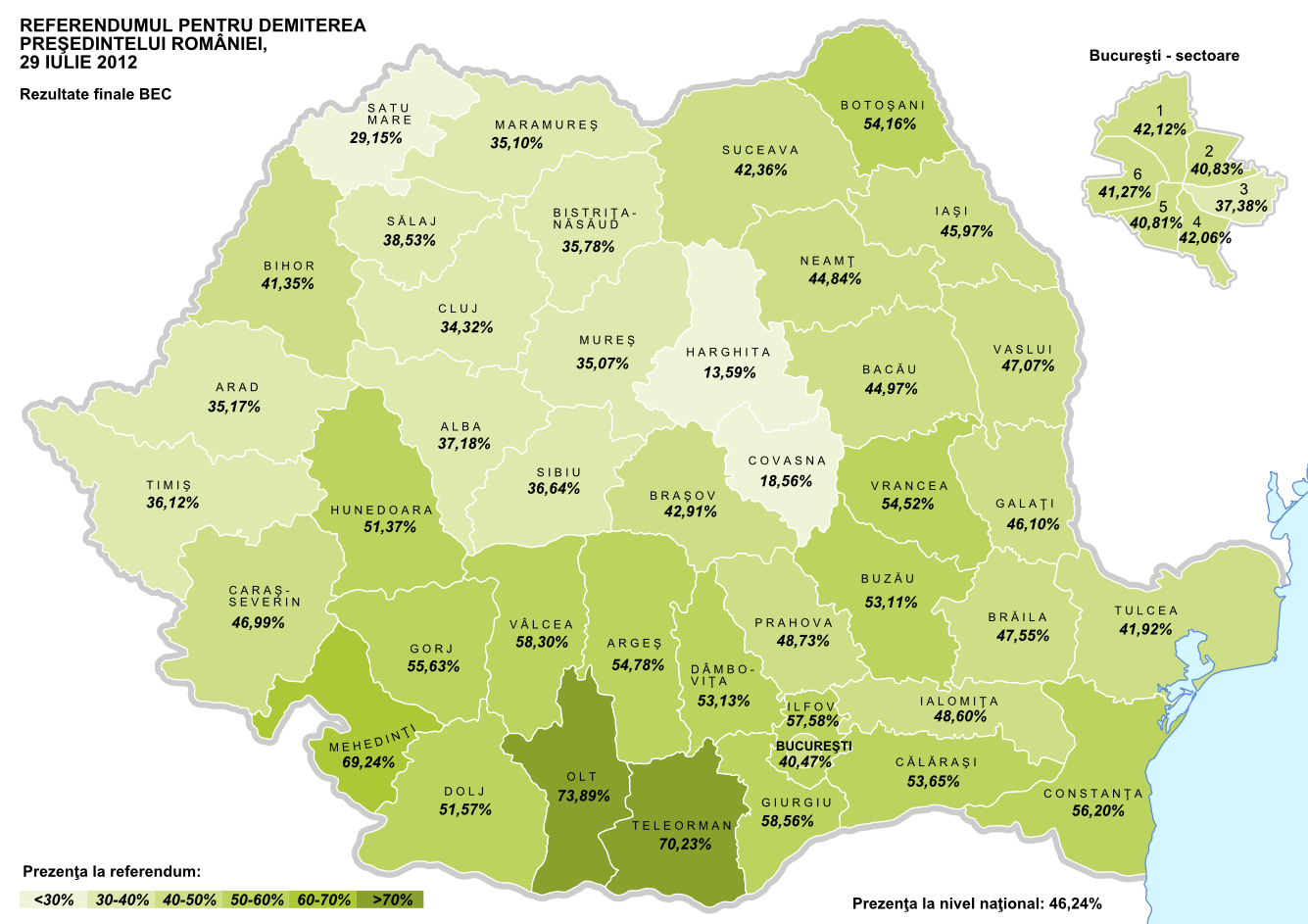
Turnout

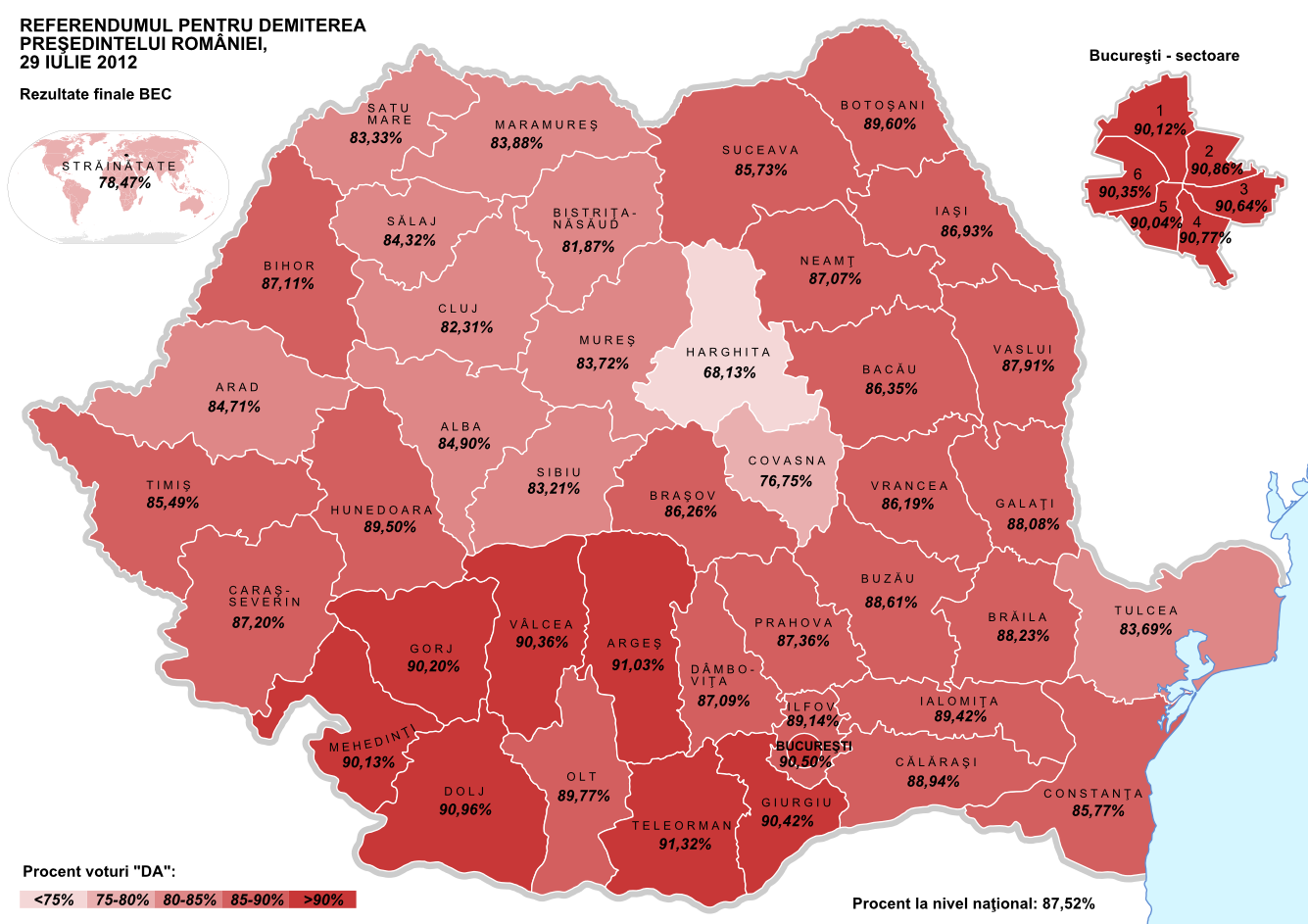
Percentage of "yes" votes

2012 Romanian constitutional crisis
Results
Choice	Votes	%
Yes	7,403,836	88.70%
No	943,375	11.30%
Valid votes	8,347,211	98.68%
Invalid or blank votes	111,842	1.32%
Total votes	8,459,053	100.00%
Registered voters/turnout	18,292,464	46.24%

Initially, in press was rumored that the referendum wasn't validated due to presence under 50% at vote. Central Electoral Bureau announced on August 1, 2012, the final results of the referendum regarding president Traian Băsescu's dismissal. According to BEC data, 46.24% of citizens entitled to vote attended the referendum. For Băsescu's dismissal voted 87.52%, and against 11.15%. 1.32% was the percentage of invalid votes. On August 2, the judge Aspazia Cojocaru declared, after the Constitutional Court meeting, that from her point of view referendum ought to be canceled, because it was based on false data. According to 20 October 2011 census, in Romania there aren't 18 million citizens eligible to vote, how many were registered on electoral lists.

Constitutional Court decided on August 21 that 29 July Romanian presidential impeachment referendum is invalid, and Traian Băsescu will return at the Cotroceni Palace. According to official sources, the decision was taken by 6 votes to 3. Shortly after this decision, Foundation for Defense of Citizens Against State Abuses sued the Romanian state at European Court of Human Rights for invalidation of the referendum. "Despite all normative acts in effect, recommendations of the Venice Commission, actual updated figures, the nine judges of the Constitutional Court of Romania ignore the political choice of the Romanians. In present-day Romania, the volition of 9 political appointees is above the volition of a nation", was said in a FACIAS communique. Furthermore, Foundation representatives say in CCR decisions material is not respected the principle of the double degree of jurisdiction, in that CCR decisions can not be appealed to any internal tribunal.

=== Communique issued by the Constitutional Court ===
On August 21, 2012, Plenum of the Constitutional Court, vested under Article 146 let. (i) of the Constitution and under Article 46-47 of the Law no. 47/1992 regarding the organization and functioning of the Constitutional Court, with the majority provided for in Article 47 para. (1) of Law no. 47/1992, decided:

1. Finds that the procedure for organizing and conducting national referendum on July 29, 2012 to dismiss the President of Romania, Mr. Traian Băsescu, was observed.
2. Confirms the results of the national referendum on July 29, 2012 provided by the Central Electoral Bureau and found that out of 18,292,464 persons listed in the permanent electoral lists participated in the vote 8,459,053 people (46.24%), of which 7,403,836 (87.52%) responded "yes" to the question "Do you agree with the dismissal of the President of Romania Mr. Traian Băsescu?", and 943,375 (11.15%) responded "no".
3. Finds that at the referendum did not attend at least half plus one of the voters included in permanent electoral lists, as the referendum to be valid in accordance with Article 5 para. (2) of Law no. 3/2000 regarding organization and conduct of the referendum.
4. At the date of publication of this Decision in the Official Gazette of Romania, Part I, the interim of Mr. George – Crin Laurenţiu Antonescu to exercise the office of President of Romania ceases.
5. From the date of publication of this Decision in the Official Gazette of Romania, Part I, Mr. Traian Băsescu resumes exercise of constitutional and legal attributions of President of Romania.

This Decision will be presented to the Chamber of Deputies and the Senate, met in joint session. The judgment is final and binding and will be published in the Official Gazette of Romania, Part I, and in the press.

— Why the Constitutional Court invalidated the referendum of 29 July, România TV

=== Controversies ===
On July 24, the President of PDL decided to urge voters to not vote at July 29's Romanian presidential impeachment referendum. The decision was made by 59 votes in favor and one abstention. Prime Minister Victor Ponta said that this action is illegal and the party led by Vasile Blaga should be acted criminally.

After casting a ballot in the referendum, Prime Minister Victor Ponta expressed "outrage" over what he called his Hungarian counterpart Viktor Orbán's intervention in the country's internal politics by telling ethnic Hungarians in Romania to stay away from the polls in a recall referendum. A count of voters from around 5pm showed turnout was lowest in the Harghita and Covasna counties, at 6.85% and 12.39%, respectively. Likewise, Attila Mesterházy, Hungarian Socialist Party leader, warned that Orbán's statements in Romania will affect the minority of ethnic Hungarians, "both short-term and long-term", considering that Hungarian Prime Minister gesture is an interference in the internal affairs of Romania. In both counties, ethnic Hungarians constitute the majority of the population.

The European Commissioner for Justice, Viviane Reding, said that after the referendum for President Traian Băsescu's dismissal, there were new pressures and attempts to influence the outcome. Reding said the referendum could not end the political crisis and pressures on judges have continued even after finding out the results, to influence them. She said "the situation in Romania remains fragile", expressing the hope that all political actors in the country are determined to bear "durable and irreversible" the rule of law and judicial independence. In response to Reding's statements, the President of the group of the Progressive Alliance of Socialists and Democrats, Hannes Swoboda, said, on September 12, in the European Parliament plenary, that, by reactions to the situation in recent months in Romania, has been impugned the objectivity of EC. "Why not responded with months before to the facts of Mr. Băsescu?", S&D leader in PE asked. Hannes Swoboda also showed that 7.4 million Romanians expressed in the referendum against President Băsescu, much more than elected him. He accused PDL MEPs, including Monica Macovei, of propaganda with falsehoods against USL.

"Where, if not here in PE, you must tell why vote of 8.4 million citizens did not matter at all to you this summer, why a rule that isn't valid anywhere in Europe was imposed to Romania and here I refer to the 50% to vote", said PSD MEP Cătălin Ivan, in his speech in EP plenary, at the debate on the political situation in Romania. Addressing to Reding, Ivan claimed that she has "acted as canvasser" of Traian Băsescu.

== December 9 legislative election ==
Results of the 2012 Romanian legislative election

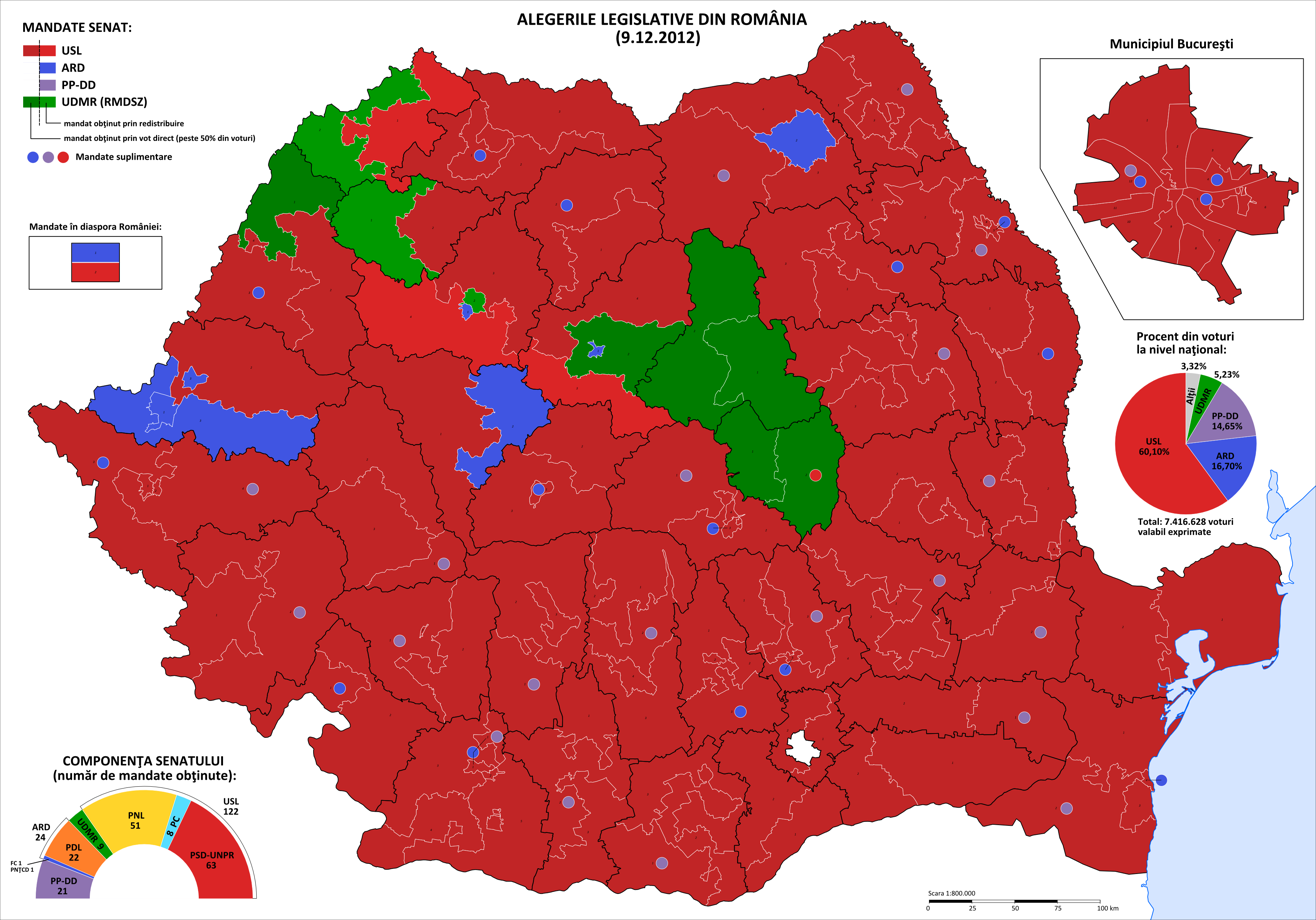
Senate

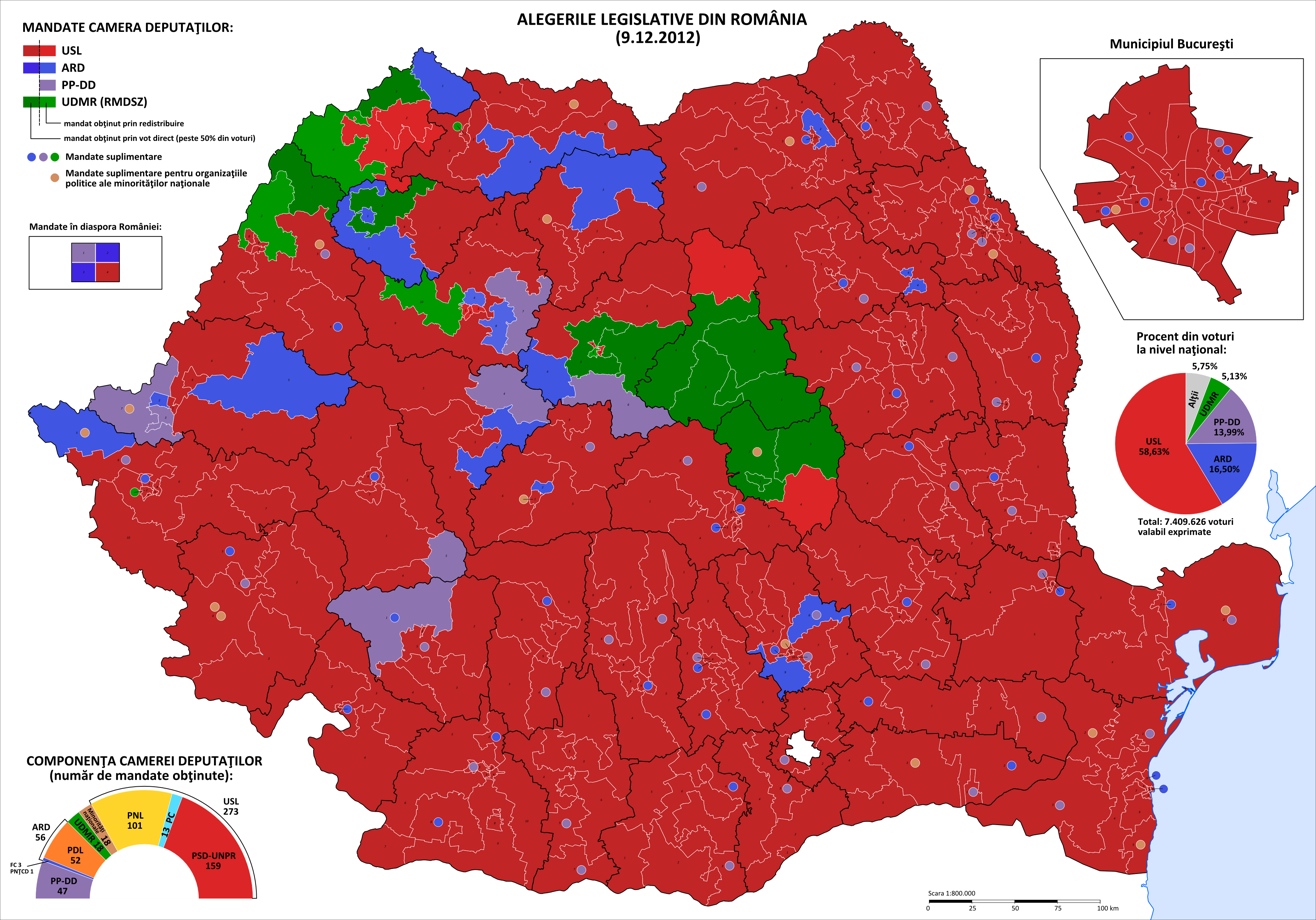
Chamber of Deputies

Legislative elections were held in Romania on 9 December 2012. The Social Liberal Union of Prime Minister Victor Ponta won an absolute majority in both the Chamber of Deputies and the Senate.

Cezar Preda resigned as senior vice-president of PDL and as president of PDL Buzău shortly after the Central Electoral Bureau published the first results of the elections, according to that he would have lost a new mandate in Buzău County, in favor of Marcel Ciolacu, his rival from the USL. Likewise, Cristian Preda resigned as senior vice president of the PDL during the Board of Directors meeting of December 14. A similar decision was taken by Sever Voinescu. Dan Diaconescu is not covered in the next Parliament. According to Gorj County Electoral Bureau, Diaconescu was voted by 32.47% of voters. His main opponent was himself Prime Minister of Romania, Victor Ponta, which received 60.98% of votes.

Once with the legislative elections, the Right Romania Alliance was dissolved, under the pretext that the alliance was only an electoral association. Amid the failure of elections, more PDL members demanded the resignation of president of the PDL, Vasile Blaga.

=== Electioneering ===
The electioneering, initiated on November 9 and ended on December 8, was not without incidents. Dan Diaconescu, candidate from PP-DD in the same college of Chamber of Deputies in Târgu Jiu with Prime Minister Victor Ponta, is investigated for electoral bribery. Authorities were notified after PSD representatives within Gorj County Council filed a complaint regarding the distribution of food and the organization of an electoral spectacle before the electioneering. According to the Emergency Ordinance issued on November 6 by Ponta Cabinet, offering food, drink and money in the campaign is illegal.

The President of PDL Vrancea, Alin Trășculescu, was caught in the act by anticorruption prosecutors while receiving €50,000 from a businessman in the form of bribe. He was detained for 24 hours for allegations of lobbyism, instigation to false and incitement to the misdemeanor of money laundering. Alin Trășculescu was under the supervision of National Anticorruption Department for two years. He claimed he could get contracts with the State, from the Ministry of Development and Tourism, led then by Elena Udrea. Eventually, Bucharest Court decided to arrest Alin Trășculescu for 29 days.

In a commune from Buzău County, USL representatives clashed with ARD sympathizers, the conflict being resolved at the arrival of local police. Two people were seriously injured and four others arrested in the altercation. On December 3, several dozens of supporters of USL, sympathizers of Victor Ponta candidate for another term as deputy in Gorj County had a confrontation which escalated into fray and fight in Târgu Jiu with the supporters of Dan Diaconescu, the PPDD rival of the Prime Minister. Following clashes, a young man was injured and taken to hospital.

== Protests ==
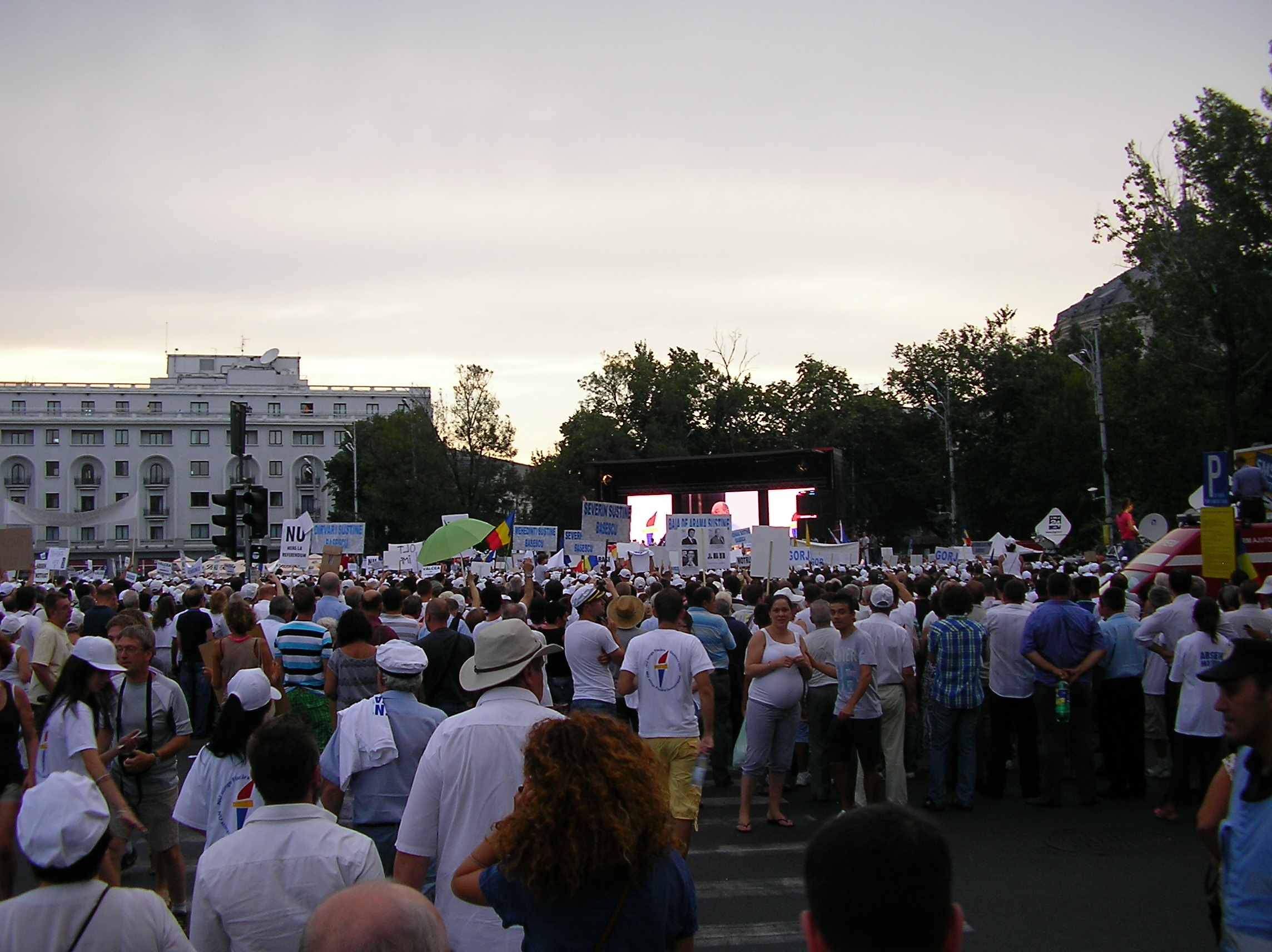
Traian Băsescu, the impeached Romanian President, speaking at a meeting in his support.

The political turmoil fractured Romanian society. Currently, the Romanian people are divided into two camps: anti-Băsescu and pro-Băsescu. Despite high temperatures, driven from behind by their parties or on their own, in several areas of the country, people began to leave the streets to defend their favorites or to protest their opponents. Thus, relatively peaceful protests have erupted in major cities of Romania. In Arad, protests turned violent when Băsescu's opponents and sympathizers clashed. The groups were quickly dispersed by police. None of the groups participating in action on Thursday evening has no authorization, can not specifying how protests will last.

Street protests were also organized in Bucharest. About one hundred people protested on July 4 at University Square against the political class. Those present displayed messages against exploitation in Roșia Montană and shale gas. At Victory Square, occurred a new demonstration against the current leadership, and came, as one day ago, former Prime Minister Mihai Răzvan Ungureanu. He argued that it is normal that people to leave in the streets, criticizing USL leader Ponta and Antonescu, which he said that "have succeeded to demonstrate how it can be trampled the Constitution". Ungureanu has transmitted to demonstrators that "he awaits them Thursday", in Revolution Square, where the Liberal Democratic Party announced the organization of an anti-USL meeting.

In the following days, protests were amplified, such that more than 2,000 people gathered at the meeting on Thursday evening, in University Square, in a demonstration in support of President Traian Băsescu, attended by prominent members of the PDL. From Thursday's protests were not without any incidents. Attending the pro-Băsescu meeting, Raluca Turcan went faint to the end of the meeting and another five people needed medical care after they felt sick to rally in Revolution Square. Some demonstrators in University Square were fought, Thursday evening, and were separated by gendarmes in device on-site, that raised two people from among recalcitrants. Protesters had altercations after two of them were taken by the gendarmes.

In Timișoara, the two groups of protesters were nearly to confront. PDL sympathizers and supporters of the President gathered Thursday evening in the center of Timișoara to denounce what they call abusive measures taken by Ponta government in last days. Spirits were heated when in the area has appeared a group of supporters of USL, shouting slogans against the President. The dispute between the two groups, initially only verbal, risked to degenerate, so gendarmes immediately intervened to appease spirits.

On July 20, USL organized largest demonstration to date in Craiova, "a major political rally with about 20,000 people". At the manifestation attended Victor Ponta, Valeriu Zgonea, Olguța Vasilescu and several ministers. Olguța Vasilescu addressed to the crowd, saying that the country must get rid of "democracy's cancer, Traian Băsescu". Prime Minister Ponta also held a speech. Rovana Plumb, Titus Corlățean, Daniel Constantin, Mircea Geoană and Călin Popescu Tăriceanu were also present at the meeting. According to spokesman of Dolj County Inspectorate of Gendarmes Ionuț Savu, the meeting was attended by approximately 18,000 people, from several counties. In Marin Sorescu Theater area, traffic was blocked for several hours.

Another major political rallies were organized by USL on July 17 in Brașov (5,000 participants), on July 22 in Iași (15,000 participants), on July 24 in Oradea (8,000 participants), on July 25 in Pitești (7,000 participants) and Alexandria (1,500 participants), on July 26 at Romexpo, Bucharest (50,000 participants), on July 27 in Râmnicu Vâlcea (700 participants).

In several cities throughout Romania were organized pro-Băsescu meetings, that few people attended: Bucharest (15,000 participants), Iași (10,000 participants), Cluj-Napoca (10,000 participants), Slatina (100 participants).

=== August–September demonstrations ===
==== 21 August ====
2012 Romania civil unrest
- Part of 2012 Romanian protests
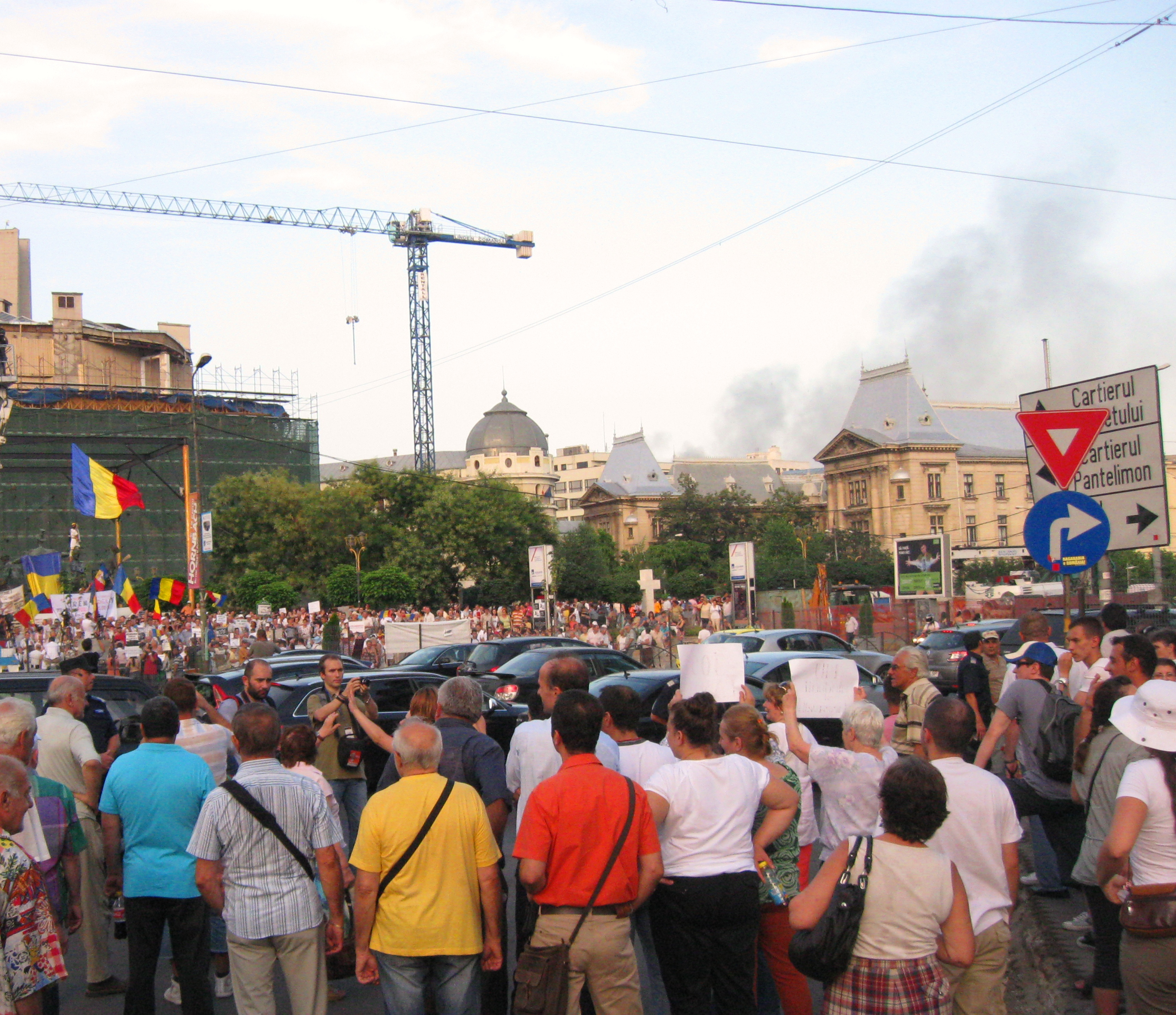
- A rally in favor of President Băsescu's impeachment (University Square, Bucharest)
- Date: 4 June 2012 – 1 December 2012 (5 months, 3 weeks and 6 days)
- Location: (Romania) Bucharest, Alexandria, Arad, Brașov, Cluj-Napoca, Craiova, Deva, Iași, Oradea, Pitești, Râmnicu Vâlcea, Sibiu, Slatina, Târgu Jiu, Timișoara (Belgium) Brussels (France) Paris (Germany) Berlin (Netherlands) The Hague (Spain) Madrid (United Kingdom) London
- Caused by: Invalidation of the referendum; Traian Băsescu's reinstatement; Reactions and statements of the European leaders
- Goals: Resignation of President Traian Băsescu; Resignation of CCR judges
- Methods: Demonstration; Occupation; Picketing; Roadblock; Civil disobedience; Internet activism
- Status: Ended

Parties
Social Liberal Union	Democratic Liberal Party

Lead figures
Băsescu's detractors: Mircea Badea; Ioan Ghișe; Varujan Vosganian; Brianna Caradja; Victor Socaciu; Mihai Gâdea; Victor Ponta; Valeriu Zgonea; Olguța Vasilescu; Rovana Plumb; Titus Corlățean; Daniel Constantin; Mircea Geoană; Călin Popescu Tăriceanu; Crin Antonescu	Băsescu's sympathizers: Mihai Răzvan Ungureanu; Monica Macovei; Cristian Preda; Emil Boc; Elena Udrea; Roberta Anastase; Vasile Blaga

Number
117,200 (incl. political rallies)	35,250+

Casualties and losses
Deaths: 1 Injuries: 16 (1 hospitalized); Arrests: 112	

More than 200 people gathered on August 21 to protest in front of the Constitutional Court. They asked judges to validate the 29 July referendum, as suspended president Traian Băsescu to be dismissed. Moreover, in a petition on the Internet, approximately 2,000 people demanded that the meeting where CCR will decide the fate of the referendum to be broadcast live by television. Protesters chanted "Validation!" and have stirred flags and banners with different messages. People said they have not been complied with voting options and they didn't trust even the decisions of the Constitutional Court.

After the Constitutional Court invalidated the referendum for dismissal of Traian Băsescu, more people, dissatisfied with the verdict, went to the presidential campaign center, where they chanted against him, one of the protesters being detained by gendarmes. On the way to University Square, protesters also stopped in front of the Supreme Court Parquetry, where several minutes chanting "Thieves". At the same time, crowd was joined by a group of several dozen people that displayed a banner that was written "Outlaws Association", some of whom being dressed in national costumes.

In the evening, over 2,000 people protested in front of the National Theatre. Protesters shouted messages against CCR decision of invalidation of the referendum and asked Traian Băsescu to resign. Also, most people have come up with anti-US placards with messages, considering that Băsescu was reinstalled at Americans desire.

Spirits were engirt and, at around 9:00 p.m., people breached fences and entered on the carriageway, blocking traffic. The gendarmes did not intervene, only forming a cordon to be prepared if people resort to violence. Traffic was diverted and only around midnight was resumed in the Square area, when protesters began to withdraw to their homes. Nevertheless, dozens of people continued to protest after midnight.

==== 22 August ====
Gendarmes identified 106 people who blocked traffic on 21 and 22 August in University Square. Authorities say they have not protested peacefully and have disturbed public peace "by producing noise with any device or object or by shouting". Were given 50 fines between 200 and 1,000 lei those who troubled peace and other 49 people have records because they have blocked designedly the Magheru Boulevard. Likewise, 7 people have criminal records for destruction and outrage.

As provided in the Constitution, Gendarmerie has no right to make criminal records. On this line, the Interior Minister Mircea Dușa commissioned an inquiry to Gendarmerie, sanctioning those who have announced the criminal records and accusing them of incompetence.

==== 28 August ====
Ioan Ghișe, the PNL Senator who asked Parliament to take note that Traian Băsescu is justly dismissed, protested in front of the Cotroceni Palace against Băsescu's reinstatement. With two banners attached to the body, Senator said that it is "a symbolic gesture" and promised to come every day, "as will be fair weather".

PNL Senator, Ioan Ghișe, proposed two variants of attack of invalidation of the referendum: either the Parliament to resend the Constitutional Court decision through which the referendum is considered invalid, or the Parliament to ascertain that suspended president Traian Băsescu is dismissed, but Parliament's plenary didn't approved the debate of his projects.

Moreover, Senator Ghișe prepared penal complaints against the six judges of the Constitutional Court who voted to invalidate the referendum of 29 July, with the following counts: usurpation of official qualities, undermining the sovereignty of the people, abuse in office and negligence in office. "All these malfeasences are provided by the Penal Code with imprisonment", PNL Senator said.

==== 1 September ====
Over 300 people gathered in front of Sector 2 City Hall booed President Traian Băsescu, when he arrived in arm with his daughter. People did care about this special moment in the life of Elena and shouted "Resignation!" or "Down with Băsescu!". People yelled "Thieves!" and booed them and some of them gathered in front of Sector 2 City Hall and applauded him, the President, but after civil wedding.

Some of the people who booed Băsescu's arrival say they are among those who protested against the president both at the university and at the Cotroceni Palace.

Before the arrival of family Băsescu at Sector 2 City Hall, between protesters and a few sympathizers of the president a conflict broke out. The groups first had an exchange of words, whereupon two old men began to jostle. The conflict was interrupted after intervention of local police. Around 4:00 p.m., gendarmes mounted fences at the church of Saint Spiridon, where took place the religious wedding of Elena Băsescu, to avoid more civil conflicts.

==== 18 September ====
Hundreds of protesters gathered, on September 18, in front of the Cotroceni Palace in Bucharest, where chanted anti-presidential slogans. A young man who tried to throw over the fence of the palace a roll of toilet paper was forcedly stopped by gendarmes on the ground, fact that outraged the protesters.

On the same day, a Romanian climbed on the metal structure of the entry into the Brussels-Luxembourg railway station, under the office windows of Euro-MPs. "He was equipped with a mouthpiece and have something to share with Barroso, Schulz, Mazzoni, mafia in Romania etc.", PDL MEP Sebastian Bodu wrote on his Facebook account. PE security officers, police and firefighters forcedly climbed him down. Afterwards, he was arrested.

==== 1 December ====
More than 20,000 people attended the military parade organized with the occasion of the National Day. The event was marked by moments in which President Traian Băsescu was booed by some of the spectators. At the same event, representatives of the Romanian Gendarmerie assaulted some of the protesters that attended the parade. The chief of Bucharest Gendarmerie, Brigadier General Eugen Meran, was warned, and Major Claudiu Gogu, Head of Service within the same structure, was dismissed, following internal controls regarding the fulfillment of the mission of ensuring public order and safety, by some representatives of the Gendarmerie, with the occasion of 1 December.

== Impact ==
Reference rate leu/euro announced on July 23 by the National Bank of Romania reached a new record high, of 4.6460 units, and the official rate for the dollar struck a new record and rose to 3.7999 lei/dollar. From July 3, when political tensions began to increase, on the interbank market leu fell by 4.2% against the euro, and stock prices began to exceed record after record. The rate for Swiss franc increased from 3.8173 lei/franc to 3.8314 lei/franc, representing the maximum for the last 11 months. A higher official rate was recorded on August 12, 2011, when franc was quoted at 3.8926 lei.

Politically, infighting in the summer of 2012 had deteriorated the image of Romania in the face of European leaders. After the EU officials perceived the Ponta Government acts as abuses against the legal state, Romania risks to remain at the gates of the Schengen Area, but mainly to run out European funds. After Tuesday, July 3, President of European People's Party Wilfried Martens warned that Social Liberal Union has started a plan to undermine the state, and Wednesday German MEPs leader Markus Ferber said he would initiate the suspension of Romania in the European Council for "lack of minimum standards functioning the legal state", stake increased substantially when Alain Lamassoure and Elmar Brok asked the European Commission to prepare a report leading to suspension of voting rights of Romania in the European Council.

The critics that the EPP leaders and officials formulated against the Social Liberal Union Government, S&D leader Hannes Swoboda expressed the concern regarding the lack of concern of the EPP officials with respect to the erosion of democracy in FIDESZ led Hungary.

Alike, PSD requested to Party of European Socialists the postponement or relocation to Brussels of PES Congress, as this event to be not "shadowed" by political infighting, and Brussels transfer decision will be officially announced next days, declared on August 30, Hannes Swoboda, S&D leader in the European Parliament.

== Reactions ==
=== Domestic ===
Radu Zlati, former adviser to the interim president Crin Antonescu, recognizes that the PNL leader has problems within his own party. In a post on his blog, Zlati says that in the National Liberal Party coalesces a movement that aims to Antonescu's removal from office. He argues, however, that a possible coup will fail. In press favorable to Traian Băsescu was launched, on September 5, the assumption of tensions in the USL. The strategy is to demobilize USL and confuse the electorate. Using the pretext of a declaration of "dissident" Ludovic Orban, the manipulative tentative culminated with breaking news headlines about "USL breakage".

Reactions and statements of European leaders regarding Traian Băsescu's reinstatement irritated Băsescu's detractors. PNL Vice-president Relu Fenechiu considered that in the test of Băsescu's dismissal Romanians confronted with the U.S., Germany and the European Commission.

Crin Antonescu, USL Co-president, said he disagrees with Victor Ponta's position to consider well-balanced the EC attitude as against Romania, but he understands these statements as attempts to reduce Brussels' hostility. "I'm disappointed in Barroso's lack of shade to take account of what Romanians expressed by vote. It was not a well-balanced attitude. It was an obvious and assumed political bias. Barroso congratulated himself for action from Romania, that was a political gesture against millions of Romanians", Antonescu said in a TV show.

In a letter to the President of the European Parliament, Martin Schulz, with the occasion of debates organized by the EP on the political situation in Romania, former President of Romania, Emil Constantinescu, claims that in the last two months Romania "was subjected to unacceptable pressures for a member of EU, pressures coming from the European Commissioner for Justice, Viviane Reding and President of the European Commission José Manuel Barroso". "Pressures on the Romanian Parliament, the Government and Interim President, who acted within the letter and spirit of the Constitution of Romania, have no justification in any article of the European Constitution and other regulations is an abuse that creates an extremely dangerous precedent for violation of an EU Member State sovereignty. These pressures have been made based on charges unrelated to reality and are contradicted by any fair and impartial analysis of the events and documents. Now, when the process of suspension of the President and the referendum for his dismissal ended with the return in office, in the conditions imposed by EU, we can consider as a case study", he appreciates. Emil Constantinescu also says in the letter that "what Commissioner for Justice and European Commission President ignores is that the current mandate of the President of Romania is illegitimate".

Liberal superintendent of the Senate, Ioan Ghișe, announced, on September 13, in a press conference, that he submitted, at the Prosecutor's Office attached to the High Court of Cassation and Justice, criminal complaints against President Traian Băsescu and six of the judges of the Constitutional Court. In the complaint against Traian Băsescu, PNL Senator explains that President may be accused of usurpation of official qualities and of propaganda in favor of the totalitarian state.

On September 16, Democratic Liberal Party, Civic Force Party and Christian-Democratic National Peasants' Party signed the protocol Right Romania Alliance. The Alliance is founded on Justice and Truth alliance model and is initially composed of three co-presidents: Vasile Blaga (DLP), Mihai Răzvan Ungureanu (Civic Force) and Aurelian Pavelescu (CDNPP). Originally, in the Alliance also ranged the New Republic Party led by Mihail Neamțu, but, due to an appeal to the court, was temporarily waived its hiring.

=== International ===
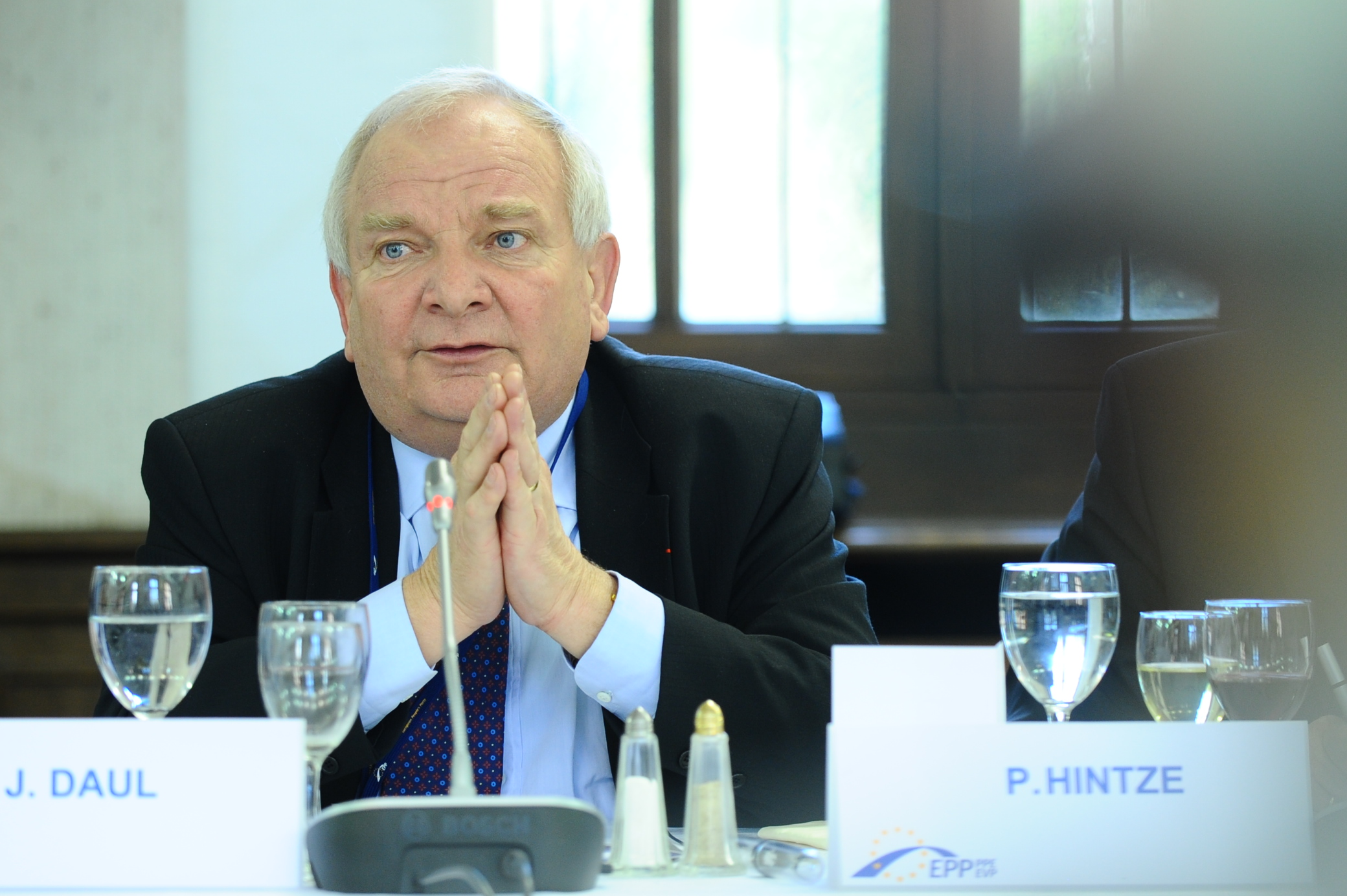
Joseph Daul accused Ponta Cabinet of coup d'etat

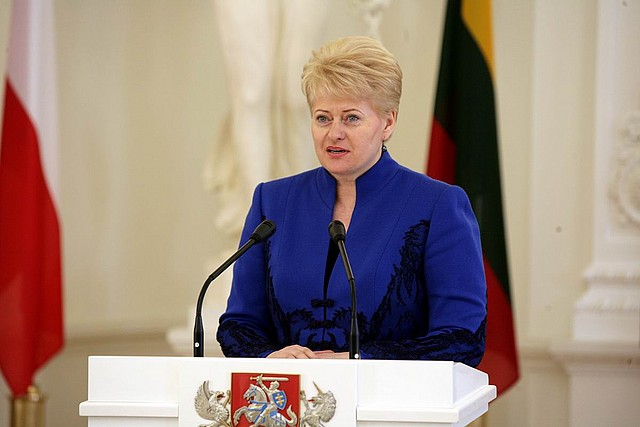
Dalia Grybauskaitė: If you won't mature, the Schengen area won't be open to you

- (European Union) Secretary General of the Council of Europe, Thorbjørn Jagland, said he was concerned by recent developments in Romania, especially those related to president's suspension, and asked the Venice Commission to examine whether these actions are compatible with state of law and with democracy. Likewise, Thorbjørn Jagland demanded an investigation of the situation.

The President of the European Liberal Democrat and Reform Party, Graham Watson, alleged that Băsescu's mandate is "illegal" and showed that the best solution for Romania would be the organization of new parliamentary and presidential elections. Watson wanted to ask the European Commission why insists as in Romania to apply the quorum rule at presidential impeachment referendum, whereas in all EU countries the president is dismissed with 50% plus one of those who come to vote.

- U.S. State Department expressed concern over recent events in Romania, specifying that all these "threaten the democratic balance of powers and weaken independent institutions as justice". On August 12, Assistant Secretary for European and Eurasian Affairs Philip H. Gordon traveled to Bucharest, where he met with senior government officials to discuss the concerns the United States has regarding recent government actions that threaten democratic checks and balances and weaken independent institutions. Assistant Secretary Gordon also met with members of civil society and the business community to discuss how their work plays a role in strengthening the democratic values and principles that unite the transatlantic community.
- On July 9, Traian Băsescu had a conversation with Angela Merkel, Federal Chancellor of Germany. The discussion took place on the phone, and, finally, Federal Government spokesman, Steffen Seibert, announced on the website of Chancellery the following: "Federal Chancellor AM today held a comprehensive telephone conversation with Romanian President Traian Băsescu. In the center of conversation it was located the current internal political developments in Romania. President Traian Băsescu exposures confirms the federal government's concerns. Federal Chancellor considers unacceptable if one EU country violates the basic principles of state of law. The European Union is based on common values: all governments are obliged to comply with them; this applies to the Romanian government. Federal Chancellor emphasizes that supports the EU regarding any necessary consequences. They might materialize after talks scheduled to have Prime Minister Victor Ponta this week in Brussels".

In Germany, "the federal government has significant doubts about the legitimacy of measures taken by the Government of Ponta", said Steffen Seibert, spokesman for German government, that "warned that developments in Romania will not be overlooked in the analysis of problem of accession (...) of the country to Schengen Area and in the Cooperation and Verification Mechanism".

Mario Kreuter from Institute for East and Southeast European Studies in Regensburg declared for Deutsche Welle: "Băsescu is everything else, but not a good democrat. He is at least as corrupt as those who say he fights. But, Băsescu's suspension is another threat to the state of law in Romania. I really do not feel sorry for someone, but how to do this is really worrying."

On July 9, German newspaper of wide circulation "Frankfurter Allgemeine Zeitung" published the article So sprechen Putschisten (Romanian: Așa vorbesc numai puciștii, English: Thus speak only coups) about these events.

- "Romanian Parliament voted Friday in favor of the suspension of center-right President Traian Băsescu, in a political crisis that gives rise to concern that democracy in Romania would be exposed to threats", annotated France-Presse. The same press agency wrote that president Băsescu has rejected USL accusations and warned about "risks for «stability and reputation of the country»" brought by this decision.
- "It is important for Romania to take into account its Constitution and laws" said Christophe Kamp, spokesman of the State Secretary for Foreign Affairs of the Netherlands, in a message sent to the French agency AFP. He added that the Netherlands is closely monitoring the situation.
- In an interview granted to Spiegel Online, Minister for Foreign Affairs of Luxembourg, the Socialist Jean Asselborn, said that in Romania take place "serious violations of principles of European law which are unacceptable".
- (Austria) Hannes Swoboda, leader of the Socialists in the European Parliament, urged the Romanian politicians, in a message posted on Twitter, "to accept" the Constitutional Court decision of invalidation of the referendum on Băsescu's dismissal. "There was a decision by the people of Romania against Băsescu but legally it was not valid. We must accept that", Hannes Swoboda wrote on Twitter.
- (Israel) "The Jerusalem Post" noted that appointment as Minister of Dan Șova, who claimed that "no Jew hadn't suffered in Romania" during the Second World War irritated the Jewish community in Romania.
- (Belgium) "An unscrupulous political act", "fulminant implementation of authoritarianism", "forced vote" are the terms in which Wilfried Martens, President of the European People's Party, describes the procedure whereby the Romanian president was suspended. From EPP parts the Liberal Democratic Party (Romania). EPP leader in the European Parliament, Joseph Daul, was even more vehement: "Removing the first three people in the state, Presidents of the two Chambers of Parliament and President, in just four days, by infringement of Parliament regulations, laws and Constitution, can be considered coup d'etat".
- President of Lithuania, Dalia Grybauskaitė, appealed to Romanian politicians in a press conference at Cotroceni Palace, on September 12, to act "mature and responsible", adding that political turmoil and change in six months of three prime ministers have altered the absorption of EU funds in Romania. "And this is a warning: if you will not be able to mature, to politically behave responsible, then the encumbrance will be on the shoulders of the people. You may not have sufficient financial resources from the EU, the Schengen area won't be open to you. And this will be the failure of all political parties", Dalia Grybauskaitė said.
- (Italy) The Venice Commission representatives expressed a suspicion regarding the constitutional method of implementation of change of presidents of the Chambers and initiation of suspension and dismissal referendum in a short time.
- (Russia) "Courts partisanship is a systemic problem, compounded by a high degree of corruption of the Romanian Government" said the Russian Foreign Minister, Sergey Lavrov, in a report on the situation of human rights in the European Union.
