= Centre-right Civic Initiative =

Romanian non-governmental organization

- Iniţiativa Civică de Centru-Dreapta
- Abbreviation: ICCD
- Successor: Forța Civică
- Formation: July 7, 2012
- Founder: Mihai-Răzvan Ungureanu
- Dissolved: September 7, 2012
- Type: NGO / Political platform
- Legal status: Merged into Civic Force
- Headquarters: Bucharest
- Location: Romania
- Affiliations: Right Romania Alliance (ARD)

Centre-right Civic Initiative (Romanian: Iniţiativa Civică de Centru-Dreapta) was a non-governmental organization in Romania. It was founded by former Prime Minister Mihai-Răzvan Ungureanu.

The initiative ran at autumn 2012 legislative elections within Right Romania Alliance (ARD).

== Electoral history ==
=== Legislative elections ===
| Election | Chamber | | | Senate | | | Position | Aftermath |
| Election | Votes | % | Seats | Votes | % | Seats | Position | Aftermath |
|---|---|---|---|---|---|---|---|---|
| 2012 | 1,223,189 | 16.52 | 3 / 412 | 1,239,318 | 16.71 | 1 / 176 | 2nd (within ARD)^{1} | Opposition to USL government (until March 2014) |
| 2012 | 1,223,189 | 16.52 | 3 / 412 | 1,239,318 | 16.71 | 1 / 176 | 2nd (within ARD)^{1} | Opposition to PSD-UNPR-UDMR-PC government (until December 2014) |
| 2012 | 1,223,189 | 16.52 | 3 / 412 | 1,239,318 | 16.71 | 1 / 176 | 2nd (within ARD)^{1} | Opposition to PSD-UNPR-ALDE government (until November 2015) |
| 2012 | 1,223,189 | 16.52 | 3 / 412 | 1,239,318 | 16.71 | 1 / 176 | 2nd (within ARD)^{1} | Supporting Cioloș Cabinet (Ind.) |

Notes:

^{1} Right Romania Alliance (ARD) members: PDL (22 senators and 52 deputies), FC (1 senator and 3 deputies), and PNȚCD (1 senator and 1 deputy).
