= New Republic (Romania) =

The New Republic Partidul Noua Republică
- President: Alin Bota
- General Secretary: Lorin Ciobanu
- Founder: Mihail Neamțu
- Founded: 29 January 2013
- Headquarters: Bucharest
- Ideology: National conservatism Christian democracy Euroscepticism; Romanian nationalism Right-wing populism
- Political position: Centre-right to far-right
- European affiliation: ECR Party (2013–2018)
- Colours: Green, blue

Website
- www.nouarepublica.2n.ro

The New Republic (Romanian: Noua Republică) is a political party in Romania. It was established in October 2011 as a grassroots movement inspired by a manifesto on blogs and center-right platforms. The movement grew and spawned more than 40 branches around the country. The first President was Mihail Neamțu, an intellectual who entered politics. The Vice President is George Mioc. On 16 March 2015, Neamțu announced he was stepping down to focus more on his family.

George Mioc also left the party in 2015. On 19 September 2015, the party had the fourth Congress in Bucharest and voted a new statute and a new president.

== History ==
In July 2012, the party's first National Convention elected Mihail Neamțu as party president. Soon after its founding, the party joined Right Romania Alliance (ARD), together with the former governing party, Democratic Liberal Party (PDL); Civic Force, the party of former Prime Minister Mihai Răzvan Ungureanu; and the Christian Democratic National Peasants' Party (PNTCD). The party filled 9 candidates on the ARD list at the 2012 legislative election, but because of administrative problems, New Republic's candidates ran as independents or under PNTCD's logo instead. The party's Vice-President at that time, Valeriu Todiraşcu, was elected to the Senate. In November 2013, the party became a member of the Alliance of Conservatives and Reformists in Europe (AECR) until 2018.

== Electoral history ==
=== Legislative elections ===
Election	Chamber			Senate			Position	Aftermath
Election	Votes	%	Seats	Votes	%	Seats	Position	Aftermath
2012	1,223,189	16.52	0 / 412	1,239,318	16.71	1 / 176	2nd (within ARD)	Opposition to USL government (2012–2014)
2012	1,223,189	16.52	0 / 412	1,239,318	16.71	1 / 176	2nd (within ARD)	Opposition to PSD-UNPR-UDMR-PC government (2014)
2012	1,223,189	16.52	0 / 412	1,239,318	16.71	1 / 176	2nd (within ARD)	Opposition to PSD-UNPR-ALDE government (2014–2015)
2012	1,223,189	16.52	0 / 412	1,239,318	16.71	1 / 176	2nd (within ARD)	Opposition to the technocratic Cioloș Cabinet (2015–2017)
