= Oliver Davies (theologian) =

British systematic theologian

Anthony Oliver Davies (born 10 January 1956) is a British systematic theologian. He has made contributions to the study of medieval mysticism (especially Meister Eckhart), early medieval Welsh and Irish spirituality, and contemporary Systematic Theology. He presently works in the fields of neuroscience, theology (including Sino-theology) and social transformation. Davies is the originator together with Paul Janz and Clemens Sedmak of 'Transformation Theology'. Since 2004 he has held the chair of Christian Doctrine at King's College London, as a Roman Catholic layman. He is founding director of the Centre for Social Transformation at King's College London, which specializes in the development of 'global' or 'ecumenical' understandings of the self in the light of comparative philosophy, traditional philosophies and new advances in the neurology of social cognition.

== Biography ==
Oliver Davies was born in Bradford, United Kingdom, in 1956 but grew up in South Wales (his father was Eryl Davies). He attended Cardiff High School and then Merton College, Oxford (1975–9), where he studied German and Russian. He completed his doctoral work in the area of Religion and Literature, with a study of the German Jewish poet Paul Celan, at Wolfson College, Oxford (1979–86). He met his wife Fiona Bowie at Wolfson and they married in 1981. From 1982 to 1984 Davies lectured in English at the University of Cologne. His first publications were in the area of the medieval German mystical tradition, especially Meister Eckhart. From 1989 he taught theology at University of Wales, Bangor until his appointment as lecturer in theology at University of Wales, Lampeter in 1993 (Senior Lecturer from 1995 and Reader from 1997). Following the untimely death of Colin Gunton, Davies was appointed in 2004 to the Chair of Christian Doctrine at King's College London. From 2006 to 2009, he served as Head of the Department of Theology and Religious Studies at King's. At King's College, he worked with Colin Gunton and Mihail Neamțu among others.

Davies was visiting professor in the Department of Religion, University of Virginia, in 2002–3, and held the McCarthy Visiting Professorship, Pontifical Gregorian University, Rome in 2006–7. Since 2011 he has been a regular visitor to Renmin University of China, where he works with Chinese colleagues, including the leading Chinese scholars Yang Huilin and Geng Youzhuang, on the development of a new 'ecumenical' theology reflecting Chinese culture and experience.

== Writings ==
Davies' work combines an interest in language and communication, whether textual or oral, with questions of metaphysics, ethics and doctrine. His chief works to date are A Theology of Compassion, 2000, The Creativity of God, 2004, Transformation Theology, 2007 (with Paul Janz and Clemens Sedmak) and Theology of Transformation: Faith, Freedom and the Christian Act, 2013. His work can be characterized as a progression from metaphysics, to hermeneutics and finally to philosophies and theologies of the act. His work has furthered an emphasis on the centrality of ethics and the structure of the ethical self for Christian theology. In recent work Davies has also taken up the theme of the possibility of grounding global or 'ecumenical' accounts of the self in the proto-ethical structure of the self as identified in the contemporary neurobiology of human social cognition. He is currently writing a series of articles, published in English and Chinese, on the possibilities of new contemporary 'global' accounts of the self and on 'ecumenical' theologies, working together with colleagues from China, Europe and the UK. Davies has recently published an article with the scientist and author Adam Zeman on neurology, self and culture.

== Monographs ==
- Theology of Transformation: Faith, Freedom and the Christian Act, Oxford: Oxford University Press (274 pp.), 2013.
- Transformation Theology: Church in the World, London: T&T Clark (179 pp.), 2007 (with Paul Janz and Clemens Sedmak).
- The Creativity of God. World, Eucharist, Reason, Cambridge Studies in Christian Doctrine, Cambridge: Cambridge University Press. (xi + 210 pp.), 2004.
- A Theology of Compassion. Metaphysics of Difference and the Renewal of Tradition (London: SCM Press; Grand Rapids: Eerdmans, 2003). (xxii + 376 pp.), 2001.
- Celtic Christianity in Early Medieval Wales: the Origins of the Welsh Spiritual Tradition, (Cardiff: University of Wales Press; US repr. 2008 through University of Chicago Press). (xii + 193 pp.), 1996.
- Meister Eckhart: Mystical Theologian (London: SPCK). (xiv + 257 pp.), 1991 (2nd edition 2011).
- God Within: the Mystical Tradition of Northern Europe (London: Darton, Longman and Todd; New York: Paulist Press; 1988 (2nd edition 2006).

== Edited works ==
- O. Davies and D. Turner, eds., Silence and the Word: Negative Theology and Incarnation, Cambridge: Cambridge University Press, 2002 (pb, 2008).

== Select translations ==
- Celtic Spirituality, Classics of Western Spirituality, New York: Paulist Press, 2000 (with Thomas O’Loughlin) (xxii + 550 pp.).
- Meister Eckhart: Selected Writings, Penguin Classics, Harmondsworth. Editor and translator, with introduction. (xl + 293 pp.), 1994.
- The Glory of the Lord, Vol. V, Edinburgh: T. & T. Clark; San Francisco: Ignatius Press, 1991 (English translation of the work of Hans Urs von Balthasar, John Riches, ed. 205–656).
- The Glory of the Lord, Vol. IV, 1989, 101–154).
