= Markus Ferber =

German engineer and politician (born 1965)

Markus Ferber MEP
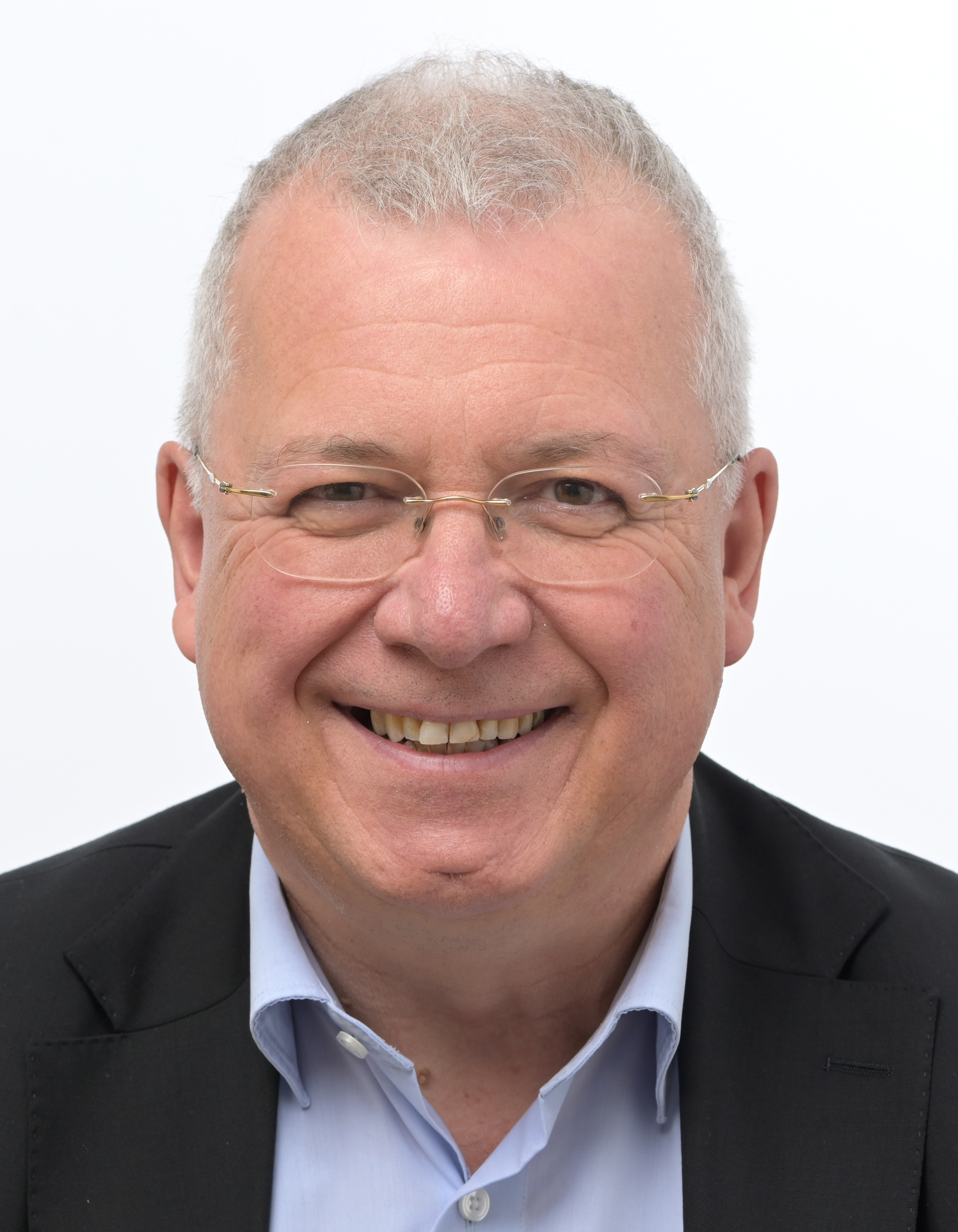

Member of the European Parliament
- Incumbent
- Assumed office 1 July 1994
- Constituency: Germany

Personal details
- Born: 15 January 1965 (age 61) Augsburg, Bavaria, Germany
- Party: German: Christian Social Union; EU: European People's Party
- Education: Technical University of Munich
- Website: www.markus-ferber.de

Markus Ferber (born 15 January 1965) is a German engineer and politician who has been serving as a Member of the European Parliament (MEP) since 1994. He is a member of the Christian Social Union, part of the European People's Party. In addition to his parliamentary work, Ferber has been serving as president of the Hanns Seidel Foundation (HSS) since 2020.

== Education ==
- 1990: Degree in electrical engineering

== Career ==
- 1990–1992: Development engineer at Siemens in Munich
- 1992–1994: Engineer in the marketing department of Pfister in Augsburg
- since 1999: CSU district chairman of the Augsburg region
- 2003–2005: Deputy District Chairman of the CSU in Swabia
- since 2005: District Chairman of the CSU in Swabia
- 1990–1999: Town councillor in Bobingen
- since 1996: Member of Augsburg district council
- since 1999: Chairman of the CSU European Affairs Group
- since 2000: Regional Chairman of the Bavaria Europa-Union

=== Member of the European Parliament, 1994–present ===
A member of the Christian Social Union in Bavaria and of the Bureau of the European People's Party, Ferber is currently a vice-chair of the European Parliament's Committee on Economic and Monetary Affairs on which he has been serving since 2009. He is also a full member of the Special Committee on Tax Rulings and Other Measures Similar in Nature or Effect and a substitute member of the Committee on Transport and Tourism. From 2016 until 2017, Ferber was part of the Parliament's Committee of Inquiry into Money Laundering, Tax Avoidance and Tax Evasion (PANA) that investigated the Panama Papers revelations and tax avoidance schemes more broadly. In 2020, he also joined the Subcommittee on Tax Matters.

Previously, Ferber was a member of the Committee on Budgets between 1999 and 2009 as well as of the Committee on Budgetary Control between 2004 and 2009. Prior to that, he served on the Committee on Research, Technological Development and Energy between 1994 and 1997.

In his capacity as member of the Committee on Economic and Monetary Affairs, Ferber led the negotiations on an update of securities trading rules, known as Markets in Financial Instruments Directive (MiFID), for the European Parliament from 2012 to 2013.

In addition to his committee assignments, Ferber serves as a member of the European Parliament's Sky and Space Intergroup (SSI) and the European Parliament Intergroup on Small and Medium-Sized Enterprises (SMEs).

In early 2014, the CSU chose Ferber to lead the party list for the 2014 European elections. He was replaced as leader of the CSU MEPs by Angelika Niebler following the party's poor showing in the elections.

=== Role in national politics ===
In 2010, Ferber was a CSU delegate to the Federal Convention for the purpose of electing the President of Germany. In the negotiations to form a Grand Coalition of Chancellor Angela Merkel's Christian Democrats (CDU together with the Bavarian CSU) and the SPD following the 2013 German elections, he was part of the CDU/CSU delegation in the working group on banking regulation and the Eurozone, led by Herbert Reul and Martin Schulz.

Ferber was nominated by his party as delegate to the Federal Convention for the purpose of electing the President of Germany in 2022.

== Political positions ==
Amid the 2012 Romanian constitutional crisis, which had been sparked by a dispute between President Traian Băsescu and Prime Minister Victor Ponta, Ferber said he would initiate the suspension of Romania in the European Council for "lack of minimum standards functioning the legal state."

== Controversy ==
In 2017, Politico Europe revealed, in letter to chief executives of Europe's biggest asset management companies, that Ferber had promoted a commercial product that allows companies to navigate key requirements in MiFID II, rules he helped usher into EU law. Ferber was affiliated with the financial service product that he promoted, as it was offered through a foundation he co-founded with the CEO of the company that produces it, but had not declared the affiliation to the Parliament. By early 2018, President of the European Parliament Antonio Tajani, decided that Ferber would not face disciplinary action from the Parliament.

In November 2020, Ferber starred in a controversy by claiming the restitution of a stay allowance of 323 euros a day, which had been suspended during the second wave of the pandemic since it was strongly discouraged to physically go to the European Parliament. The protest was rejected by the President of the European Parliament David Sassoli for defective form. This daily allowance of 323 euros is added to a monthly salary of 6,962.95 euros and an allowance for general expenses of 4,563 euros per month.

== Other activities ==
=== Corporate boards ===
- Deutsche Vermögensberatung (DVAG), Member of the Advisory Board
- Kreissparkasse Augsburg, member of the supervisory board

=== Non-profit organizations ===
- Augsburg University of Applied Sciences, member of the board of trustees
- Sparkassenverband Bayern, member of the advisory board
- European Academy of Bavaria, Member of the Board of Trustees
- European Logistics Platform, member of the advisory board
- Max Planck Institute of Neurobiology, member of the board of trustees

== Recognition ==
- Bundesverdienstkreuz
- Bavarian Medal of Honour for Bavarians in Europe

== See also ==
- 2004 European Parliament election in Germany
