= Mihail Neamțu =

Romanian politician (born 1978)

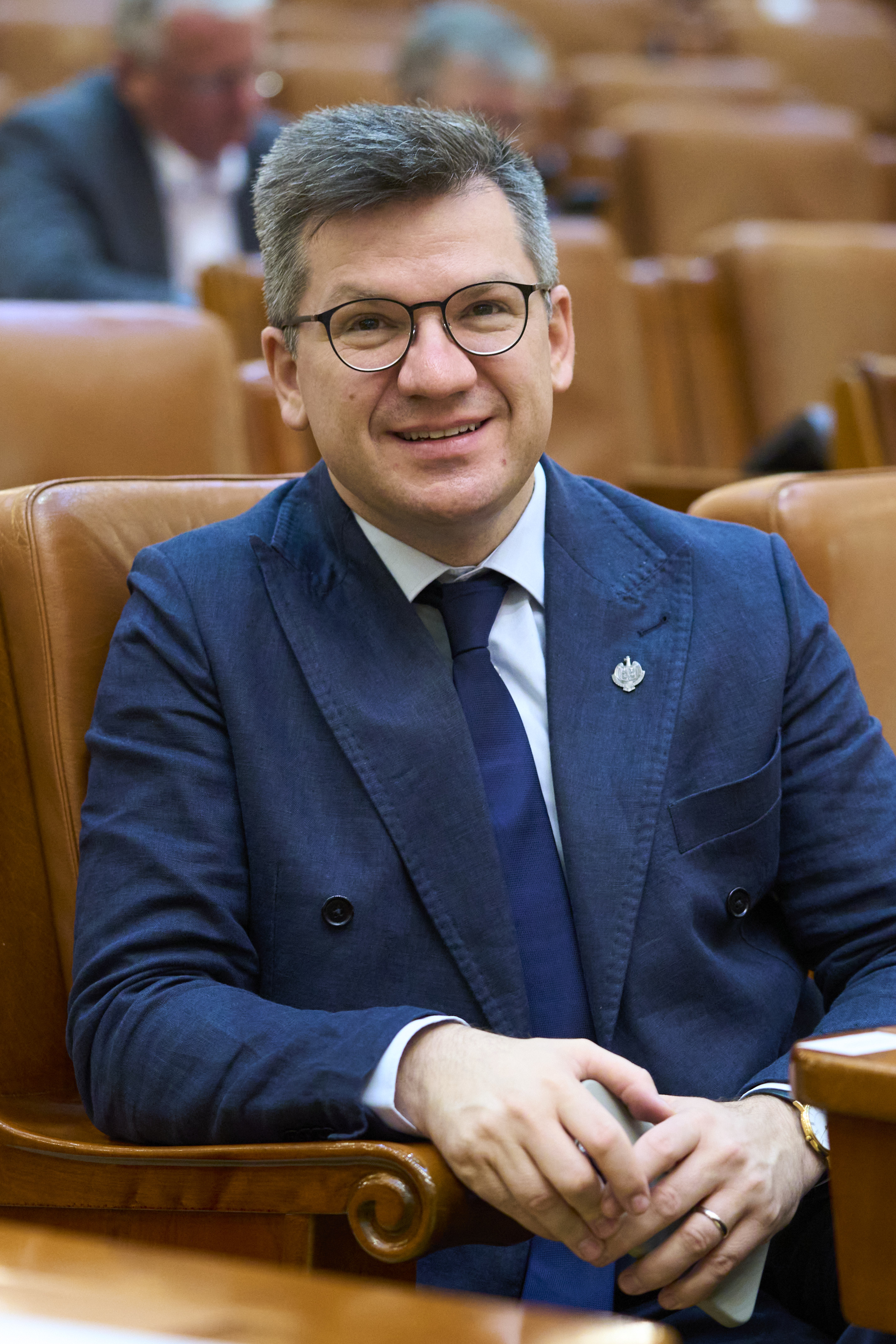
- Neamțu in 2025

Member of the Chamber of Deputies
- Incumbent
- Assumed office 21 December 2024

President of the New Republic Party
- In office 29 January 2013 – 16 March 2015
- Succeeded by: Alin Bota

Personal details
- Born: George-Mihail Neamțu; 16 April 1978 (age 48) Făgăraș, Romania
- Party: Alliance for the Union of Romanians (since 2024)
- Other political affiliations: Christian Democratic National Peasants' Party (1993–2012); New Republic Party (2013–2015); National Liberal Party (2017–2019); People's Movement Party (2019–2022)
- Spouse: Beatrice Bordianu (m. 2021)
- Children: 2
- Education: Moise Nicoară National College
- Alma mater: Babeș-Bolyai University; LMU Munich; Durham University; King's College London
- Occupation: Politician; theologian; writer
- Website: mihailneamtu.org

George-Mihail Neamțu (Note: Romanian pronunciation: [mihaˈil ˈne̯amtsu]) (born 16 April 1978) is a Romanian theologian and politician who has served as a member of the Chamber of Deputies since 2024. A member of the Alliance for the Union of Romanians (AUR) party since that year, he was previously a member of the Peasants' Party from 1993 to 2012 before founding the New Republic party, which he led until 2015.

Born and raised in Transylvania, Neamțu attended the Moise Nicoară National College in Arad and studied philosophy at Babeș-Bolyai University from 1996 to 2000, later continuing at LMU Munich, the University of Durham, and King's College London, graduating with a Master of Theology from the latter in 2005. An Orthodox Christian, he has written books on religion, politics, and culture, among other topics, particularly focusing on the relationship between religion and national identity and the theology of Dumitru Stăniloae. His books include Zeitgeist (2007), Bufnița din dărâmături (2005), Credință și rațiune (2013), and Iisus la Niceea (2022). He has been a regular contributor to the popular media, including Adevărul, Libertatea, and Gândul.

A conservative, Neamțu published a political manifesto in September 2011, leading to the founding of the New Republic party in July 2012. After an unsuccessful run in that year's parliamentary election, he resigned as chairman in 2015. He unsuccessfully ran in the 2020 local elections, and in 2024 joined AUR for which he was elected to the Chamber of Deputies in the 2024 parliamentary election.

== Early life and education ==
=== Family background ===
Mihail Neamțu was born on 16 April 1978 in the Transylvanian city of Făgăraș, Brașov County in the Socialist Republic of Romania. His father, Gheorghe, came from Arad County and worked at a chemical plant, later becoming a computer engineer. His mother, Emilia, came from Dolj County and was a Romanian language schoolteacher. At age six, the family moved to the commune of Târnova, Arad County. About his early childgood, Neamțu stated in 2012:

They had no family roots there [Făgăraș], no relatives, and I was raised in dire poverty, in a block of flats until the age of six. When I was born, my parents owned a table, two pairs of cutlery, and some books. I remember that at six years old my mother would send me to buy România Literară.

— Mihail Neamțu to Revista Kamikaze, October 2012

Early on in his life, his paternal grandfather introduced him to Orthodox Christianity. During his early 20s, Neamțu lived for a few months at a Benedictine monastery near Lugano, Switzerland, later moving to different monasteries throughout England. At age 22, following the breakup with his girlfriend – later described as "the only time I truly understood suicidal impulses – Neamțu attempted to pursue monasticism.

=== Studies ===
In 1996, Neamțu enrolled in the Faculty of Philosophy and Theology at Babeș-Bolyai University in Cluj-Napoca, graduating with a BA in 2000. During the 2000–2001 academic year, he was a Socrates exchange student in Germany at LMU Munich.

== Academic work ==
=== Dissertations ===
In 2002, Neamțu completed his Master of Arts research at Durham University, with his dissertation Theology and Language in St Gregory of Nyssa written under the supervision of Andrew Louth. The same year, he embarked on doctoral research at King's College London, where he worked with Colin Gunton and Oliver Davies.

In 2008, Neamțu defended his doctoral dissertation at King's College London. His unpublished thesis looks at various points of theological convergence between the supporters of the Nicene Creed and the leaders of the Christian monastic movement in fourth-century Egypt. Neamțu claimed that the Church bishops gathered at Nicaea offered a paradoxical understanding of the consubstantial relationship between the Father and the Son, which subverted the Master and Slave dialectics so rampant in the pagan world (as it is described by Hegel in the Phenomenology of Spirit).

=== Work on orthodoxy and nationalism ===
In his 2006 article Revisiting Orthodoxy and Nationalism, Neamțu maintains the universality of Eastern Orthodoxy, whereby its concerns are "infinitely broader than any national or ethnic project", while also being "real, incarnated, and spread out in the world, against the fickleness of our human nature" for which reason the Church often struggles with problems of national identity. Neamțu argues that by calling itself "Romanian", the Romanian Orthodox Church "is laying claim to a perfect match between religious and national identity that is not borne out by real life". In the article, Neamțu also identifies Romanian cleric Nicolae Bălan's (1882–1955) emphasis on the relationship between the Church's founding and national diversity as pivotal for an ethnotheological interpretation of history. With reference to conciliarity, Neamțu defines the Romanian Orthodox Church as "the Christian community governed by the Romanian Patriarchate of Bucharest, found in communion with all other Orthodox Patriarchates in the inhabited world (oikoumene)".

Neamțu published Gramatica Ortodoxiei in 2007, described by Sorin Lavric in România Literară as an attempt "to hold together realms too often prised apart: the intellectual integrity of theology and the lived conviction of faith". Neamțu writes that within modern nation states, the Orthodox Churches were confronted with the problems of confessional and ethnic alterity and theologically justifying their own relationship to the nation, with neither the Bible nor patristics offering a clear basis for justifing the Church's attachment to a particular ethnic identity. On 31 January 2011, the day of the death of Bartolomeu Anania, Neamțu praised his legacy.

=== Study of Dumitru Stăniloae ===
In 2012 research on the theology of Dumitru Stăniloae (1903–1993), Neamțu takes a position similar to that of his former professor Andrew Louth, writing that "Stăniloae's apologetics was shaped by confessional bias and rhetorical clichés", including "the reduction of Roman Catholic spirituality to mere legalism". Neamțu notes Stăniloae's lasting heritage not as nationalism, but his "truly inspired" exegetical work on Scripture and the Church Fathers.

=== Affiliations ===
In addition to his academic work, Neamțu has been affiliated with the Acton Institute, contributing essays on political theology, ethics, and market economics. His writings have appeared in various publications, both Romanian and international, on topics such as conservative thought, Christianity, and classical liberalism. From May to August 2009, he served as public policy scholar at the Wilson Center.

In 2017, he was featured in an issue of Religion & Liberty, the Acton Institute's quarterly journal; the editorial highlighted his interview reflecting on the Russian Revolution and contemporary anti-corruption protests in Romania.

== Political views and activities ==
=== Early political activity (1993–2017) ===
Mihail Neamțu joined the Christian Democratic National Peasants' Party (PNȚCD) in 1993 aged 15. In an article published in a Sibiu magazine in 1994, Neamțu wrote favourably of Romanian fascist politician Corneliu Zelea Codreanu (1899–1938), praising the Iron Guard as "a spiritual school" for "the restoration of the Romanian soul". In his 2007 book Zeitgeist, Neamțu renounces his comments as "infantile paragraphs" written from "historical and sentimental ignorance". In 2003, Neamțu criticised the Bucharest Mosque project, rebuking it as an attempt by Turkish prime minister Recep Tayyip Erdoğan to segment influence in the country. From 2010 until 15 September 2011, Neamțu served as scientific director at the Institute for the Investigation of Communist Crimes and the Memory of the Romanian Exile. In 2006, he criticised the reactions of Muslim countries to the Danish Jyllands-Posten Muhammad cartoons controversy.

Until founding the New Republic party in October 2011, Neamțu remained only politically affiliated with PNȚCD, although he in 2012 said that he "being of the school of Corneliu Coposu and Ion Rațiu" did not "commit the sin of trailism" during his time in the party. On moving from the academic to the political field, Neamțu stated:

[...] it was a great challenge to descend among the people, as an intellectual, and to discover that I was limited. Thus, I went from the luxury of journalistic reading to the risk of political commitment

— Mihail Neamțu, 2 November 2012

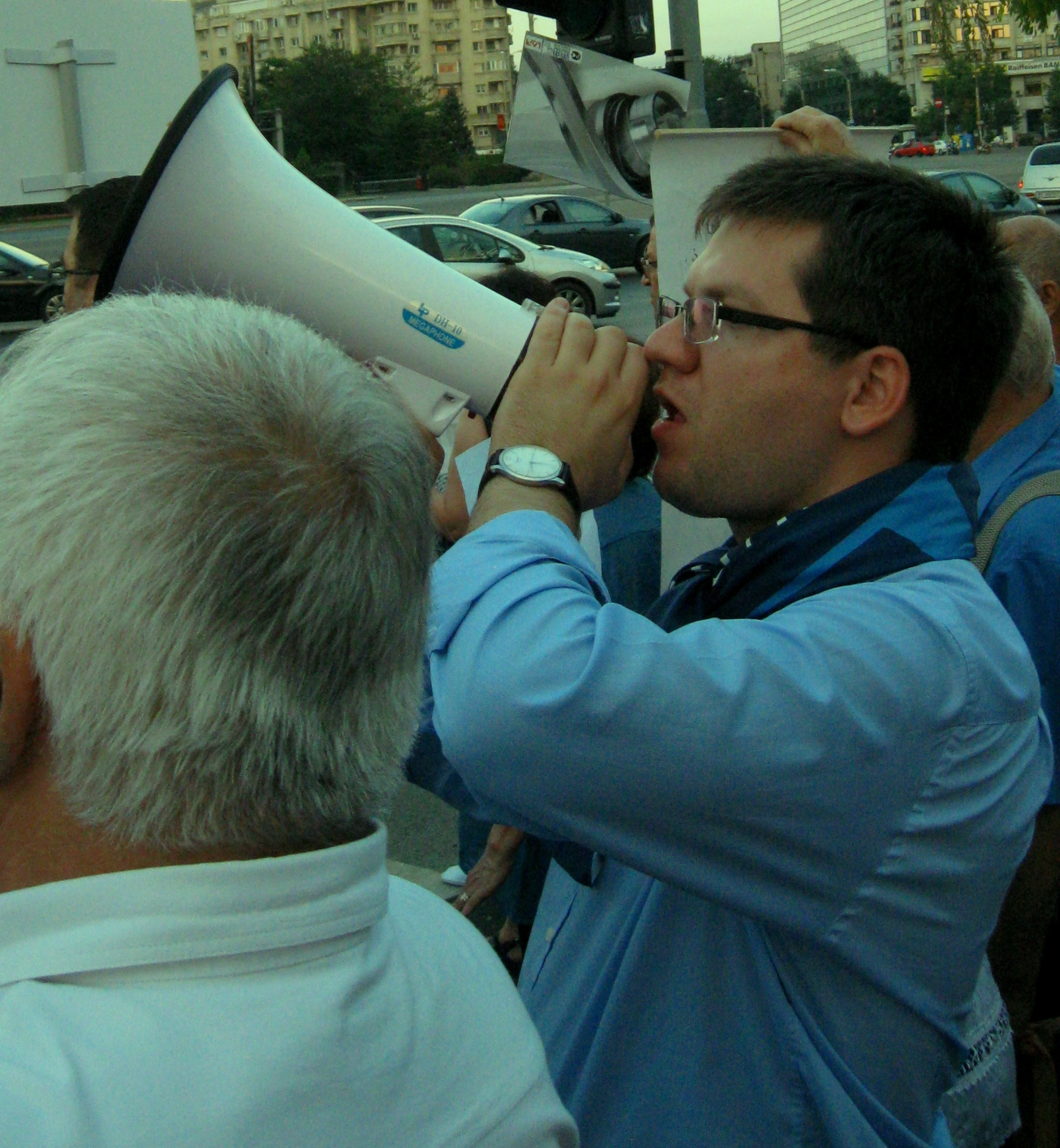
Mihail Neamțu protesting against Traian Băsescu's impeachment, 9 July 2012

In May 2012, Neamțu interviewed British politician Daniel Hannan of the Conservative Party on the European Union and Margaret Thatcher. By mid-July 2012, Neamțu had become actively involved in supporting incumbent president Traian Băsescu, campaigning against his impeachment in 2012 presidential impeachment referendum held on 29 July and blaming the constitutional crisis on prime minister Victor Ponta. In the end, 88.7 per cent voted in favour of impeachment, with the vote failing to pass due to low turnout. During an event for the launch of the Right Romania Alliance (ARD) electoral alliance on 12 November 2012, Neamțu recited the poem Arise Gheorghe, Arise Ioan by Romanian fascist poet Radu Gyr, which led other ARD leaders to distance themselves from Neamțu's remarks. Neamțu defended himself, stating that his intention by reciting the poem had been to honour victims of the Nazi Holocaust and Soviet Gulags.

In the 2012 parliamentary election on 9 December, he ran as an ARD candidate for the Chamber of Deputies in Arad County, securing, with 30.2 percent of the vote, second place in the county's first district, failing to be elected. The ARD was affiliated with the European Conservatives and Reformists Group. In March 2014, Neamțu along with philosopher Gabriel Liiceanu took part in a rally against the television stations owned by politician and businessman Dan Voiculescu following critical comments by Antena 3 hosts Mihai Gâdea and Mugur Ciuvică against writer Andrei Pleșu. Neamțu ran unsuccessfully as ARD's lead candidate for the 2014 European Parliament election in Romania on 25 May. On 16 March 2015, Neamțu resigned as chairman of the ARD. After this, he took a break from public life.

=== Return to politics (2017–2024) ===
On 4 July 2017, hours after publishing The Trump Phenomenon, Neamțu announced that he had joined National Liberal Party (PNL), posing with its leader Ludovic Orban. Following a successful citizens' initiative in late-2017 by Romanian NGO Coaliția pentru Familie, a referendum on the definition of family in the Romanian Constitution was held on in October 2018, during which Neamțu campaigned for changing the definition of marriage to be between a man and a woman, whereby prohibiting same-sex marriage. On election day, 93.4 per cent voted in favour of the change, but the referendum failed to pass due to low turnout.

Having left PNL, Neamțu joined the People's Movement Party (PMP) in 2019. By July 2019, Neamțu was described as a key contentor in becoming the PMP candidate for the 2019 Romanian presidential election in November. On 5 August, The Right Alternative endorsed Neamțu for president of Romania. On 24 August, he withdrew from the party's internal race, endorsing Theodor Paleologu. He was appointed the party's spokesman on the following day. In the end, Paleologu finished fifth with 5.7% of the vote and incumbent president Klaus Iohannis being reelected.

In the 2020 local elections on 27 September, Neamțu ran as a PMP candidate in Bucharest's Sector 3. During the campaign, he was highly critical of the other parties. On election day, Neamțu received 7.1 per cent of the vote, obtaining a seat in the city council with Robert Negoiță winning the sector's mayorship. However, he resigned from the city council on 12 October of that year. During the 2020 United States presidential election, Neamțu endorsed Donald Trump, stating that he election of Joe Biden would straighten China and weaken anti-corruption measures. A 2024 study published in Taylor & Francis on the 2020 Romanian parliamentary election found that Neamțu was among the most publicised Romanian politicians, writing that he had gathered "a meme-worthy status" akin to that of Corneliu Vadim Tudor.

Following the February 2022 Russian invasion of Ukraine, Neamțu condemned Russian president Vladimir Putin, stating in June of that year that he was "among those who did not take guidance either from Viktor Orbán or from Matteo Salvini". Following the U.S. Supreme Court's overruling of Roe v. Wade in June 2022, Neamțu participated in a TVR debate on the legality of abortion in Romania, describing its legalisation in 1990 following the Romanian Revolution as a "trivialisation of infanticide". In a 2022 article, Neamțu characterised the policy debate on climate change as a tool by Russia and China to undermine Western civilisation.

=== AUR and member of the Chamber of Deputies (2024–present) ===
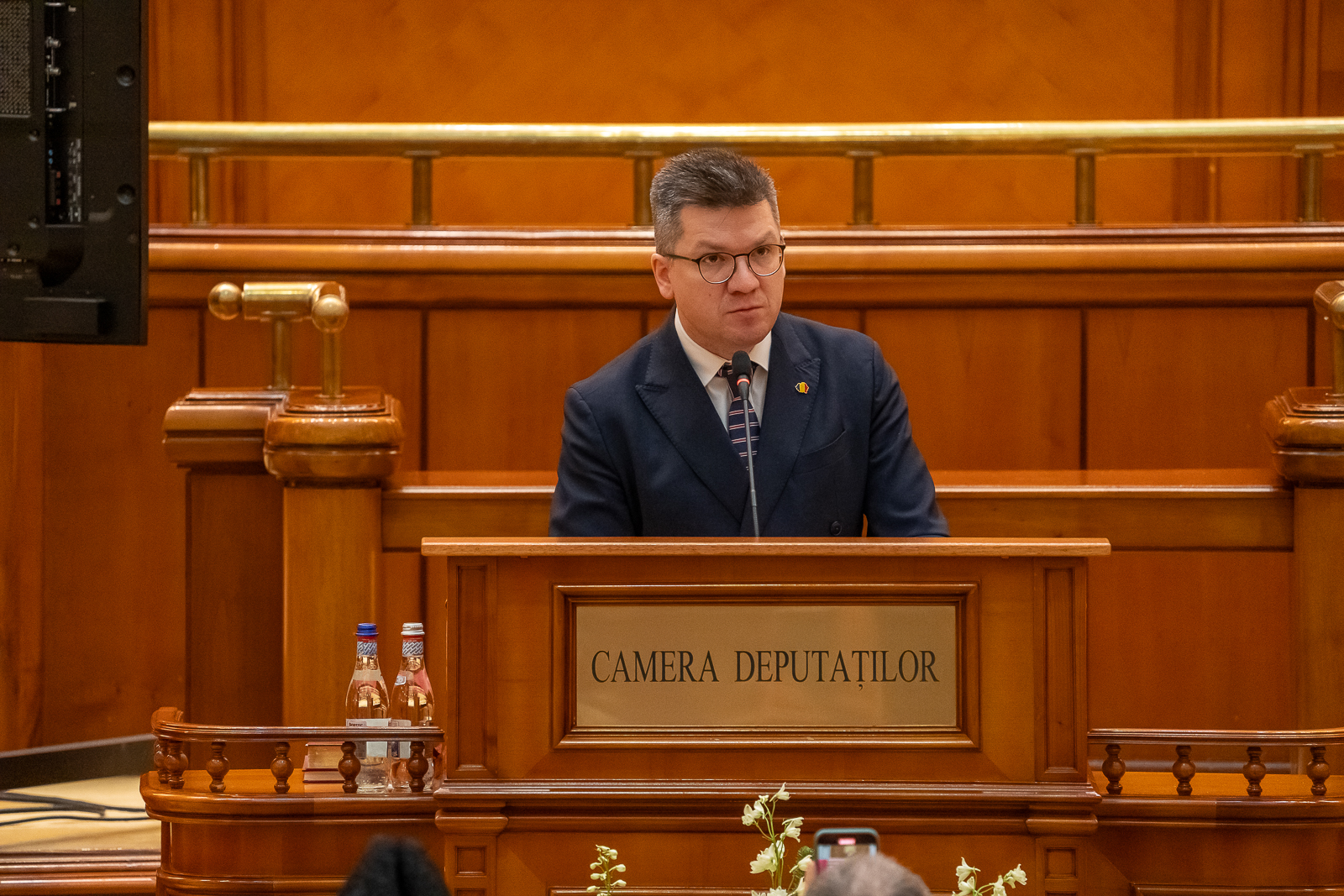
Neamțu taking the oath of office on 21 December 2024

On 2 April 2024, Neamțu announced that he had joined the Alliance for the Union of Romanians (AUR) political party led and founded by former civic activist George Simion in 2019, for which he would run as a candidate in the 2024 European Parliament election in Romania as number 10 on the list. Days later, Neamțu retracted negative statements he had made against Simion on 6 December 2020, the day of the 2020 parliamentary election, referring to his comments as "mental fog" caused by a severe COVID-19 infection. On 10 May, news media reported on negotiations between FCSB owner Gigi Becali and Neamțu to finance the latter's campaign for the European Parliament. In July 2024, he expressed Eurosceptic sentiments. In the 2024 Romanian parliamentary election on 1 December, Neamțu was elected a member of the Chamber of Deputies, assuming office on 21 December. He was concurrently appointed head of the Romanian Parliament's Culture Committee.

On 20 January 2025, Neamțu participated in the second inauguration of Donald Trump in Washington D.C. After the 2025 Drents Museum heist five days later in which the Helmet of Coțofenești was lost, Neamțu commente that the theft was "a direct attack on the national identity and a proof of the incompetence of the Romanian authorities".

In June, Neamțu received backlash for posting a photo of foreign minister Oana Țoiu edited in such a way to appear stupid. Following this, the Save Romania Union (USR) demaned that Neamțu be dismissed as head of the Culture Committee. In July of that year, following vice prime minister Dragoș Anastasiu resigning due to a corruption scandal, Neamțu commented that Romanian elites had "fused post-socialist cronyism with the language of Western virtue". In an August 2025 American Affairs article, Neamțu praised Italian prime minister Giorgia Meloni, remarking among other things "Where modernity reduces identity to performative fragments, Meloni proposes something older: a vision of womanhood that is not a repudiation of tradition, but its vindication".

== Personal life ==
On 18 October 2014, he married Adina Ioana Pleșa. In 2015, Adina gave birth to a daughter. The couple divorced in February 2017. In 2021, Neamțu married Beatrice Bordianu, marking his third marriage. Beatrice gave birth to a son in 2024. On reconciling his views on marriage and family with his private life, Neamțu stated in a June 2022 interview that it was not he who had initiated the divorces.

In 2021, Neamțu founded an online bookstore named Marilor Cărți ("Great Books"). He hosts the YouTube show Vocea Libertății ("Voice of Freedom").

== Bibliography ==
- Neamțu, Mihail. Gramatica Ortodoxiei: Tradiția după modernitate. Iași: Polirom, 2007. ISBN 978-973-46-0507-1.
- Neamțu, Mihail. Credință și rațiune. Dialoguri, contradicții, împăcări. București: Lumea Credinței, 2013. ISBN 978-606-93222-3-9.
- Neamțu, Mihail. Vârstele iubirii. Cum transformăm întâmplarea în destin?. Iași: Doxologia, 2016. ISBN 978-606-66660-0-8.
- Neamțu, Mihail. Fenomenul Trump și America profundă: Cum a înfrânt un businessman sistemul politic. București: Open Education, 2017. ISBN 978-973-0-24696-4.
- Neamțu, Mihail. Visul României Mari. București: Marile Cărți, 2022. ISBN 978-606-95598-2-6.
- Neamțu, Mihail. 7 ani în Occident. Jurnal britanic, Vol. I. București: Editura Marile Cărți, 2019. ISBN 978-973-02964-3-3.
- Neamțu, Mihail. Exilat în România. Declinul apusean și rezistența creștină. București: Editura Marile Cărți, 2022. ISBN 978-973-0-37187-1.
- Neamțu, Mihail. Geneză și Înviere. Cum citim Biblia astăzi?. București: Marile Cărți, 2022. ISBN 978-606-95598-0-2.
- Neamțu, Mihail. Iisus la Niceea. Arianism, ateism, nihilism. București: Marile Cărți, 2022. ISBN 978-973-0-36065-3.
- Neamțu, Mihail. Bufnița din dărâmături. Insomnii teologice în România post-comunistă. București: Marile Cărți, 2023. ISBN 978-606-95598-4-0.
