= Colin Gunton =

English theologian (1941–2003)

The Reverend Colin Gunton
- Born: Colin Ewart Gunton; 19 January 1941; Nottingham, England
- Died: 6 May 2003 (aged 62)
- Spouse: Jennifer Osgathorpe (m. 1964)

Ecclesiastical career
- Religion: Christianity (Reformed)
- Church: United Reformed Church
- Ordained: 1972

Academic background
- Education: Hertford College, Oxford; Mansfield College, Oxford
- Thesis: Becoming and Being (1973)
- Doctoral advisor: Robert Jenson
- Influences: Karl Barth; Samuel Taylor Coleridge

Academic work
- Discipline: Theology
- Sub-discipline: Systematic theology
- Institutions: King's College, London
- Doctoral students: Mark Butchers; Mike Harrison; Andrew Linzey; Gottfried Locher; Randal Rauser; Nigel G. Wright

Colin Ewart Gunton (19 January 1941 – 6 May 2003) was an English Reformed systematic theologian. He made contributions to the doctrine of creation and the doctrine of the Trinity. He was Professor of Christian Doctrine at King's College, London, from 1984 and co-founder with Christoph Schwoebel of the Research Institute for Systematic Theology in 1988. Gunton was actively involved in the United Reformed Church in the United Kingdom where he had been a minister since 1972.

== Biography ==
Colin Ewart Gunton was born on 19 January 1941 in Nottingham, England. He first studied literae humaniores at Hertford College, Oxford, and graduated with a [[Bachelor of Arts|Bachelor of Arts]] degree in 1964, the same year he married the schoolteacher Jennifer Osgathorpe. He then began his study of theology, and a year later received a Master of Arts degree from Mansfield College, Oxford. He then began his doctoral work under the direction of Robert Jenson, which took six years because he began teaching two years into his doctoral program as he became Lecturer in Philosophy of Religion at King's College, London, in 1969. His dissertation was a study of the doctrine of God in the thought of Charles Hartshorne and Karl Barth, which was completed in 1973.

Gunton was ordained in the United Reformed Church in 1972. He became an Associate Minister of the Brentwood United Reformed Church in 1975, a position which he held until his death. Gunton was appointed Lecturer in Systematic Theology at King's College in 1980, and in 1984 became Professor of Christian Doctrine, later becoming the Dean of Faculty from 1988 to 1990. He also served as Head of the Department of Theology and Religious Studies from 1993 to 1997. At King's College, he worked with Oliver Davies and Mihail Neamțu among others. Gunton founded and directed the Research Institute in Systematic Theology which drew distinguished scholars and many graduate students from around the world. In 1992 he delivered the Bampton Lectures at the University of Oxford, (published as The One, the Three and the Many) and delivered the Warfield Lectures at Princeton Theological Seminary in 1993. He also co-founded the International Journal of Systematic Theology with John Bainbridge Webster and Ralph del Colle in 1999.

Gunton was awarded honorary doctorates by the University of London (1993), the University of Aberdeen (1999), and shortly before his death, the University of Oxford (2003). He was also made a Fellow of King's College. Gunton died on 6 May 2003.

== Writings ==
Gunton's most influential work was on the doctrines of creation and the Trinity. One of his most important books is The One, the Three and the Many: God, Creation and the Culture of Modernity (1993), which has been described as "a profound analysis of the paradoxes and contradictions of Modernity." The One, the Three and the Many remains a "majestical survey of the western intellectual tradition and a penetrating analysis of the modern condition."

== Published works ==
=== Major works ===
- Becoming and Being: The Doctrine of God in Charles Hartshorne and Karl Barth (1978, 2nd Ed. 2001)
- Yesterday and Today: A Study of Continuities in Christology (1983, 2nd Ed. 1997) ISBN 9780281050833
- Enlightenment and Alienation: An Essay Towards a Trinitarian Theology (1985/2006) ISBN 9781597529488
- Actuality of Atonement: A Study of Metaphor, Rationality and the Christian Tradition (1988) ISBN 0-567-29220-7
- The Promise of Trinitarian Theology (1991, 2nd Ed. 1997) ISBN 0-567-08100-1
- Christ and Creation (1992) ISBN 0-8028-0579-5 | ISBN 0-85364-527-2
- The One, the Three and the Many: God, Creation and the Culture of Modernity (Cambridge University Press, 1993) ISBN 0-521-42184-5
- A Brief Theology of Revelation (1995) ISBN 0-567-09726-9 | ISBN 0-567-29293-2
- Theology Through the Theologians: Essays 1972-1995 (1996)
- The Triune Creator: A Historical and Systematic Study, Edinburgh Studies in Constructive Theology, (1998) ISBN 0-8028-4575-4
- Intellect and Action (2000, T & T Clark)
- Theology Through Preaching: Sermons for Brentwood (2001, T & T Clark) ISBN 9780567087744
- The Christian Faith: An Introduction to Christian Doctrine (2002) ISBN 0-631-21182-9
- Act and Being: Toward A Theology of the Divine Attributes (SCM Press/Eerdmans, 2002) ISBN 9780802826589
- Father, Son and Holy Spirit: Toward A Fully Trinitarian Theology (2003) ISBN 9780567089717
- Theologian as Preacher: Further Sermons from Colin Gunton (2007, T & T Clark) ISBN 9780567031211
- The Barth Lectures (2007, T & T Clark) ISBN 9780567031402

=== Edited works ===
- On Being the Church: Essays on the Christian Community (1988) ISBN 9780567095015
- Persons, Divine and Human: King's College Essays in Theological Anthropology (1991) ISBN 9780567086600
- God and Freedom: Essays in Historical and Systematic Theology (1995) ISBN 9780567097255
- The Doctrine of Creation (1997)
- The Cambridge Companion to Christian Doctrine (1997) ISBN 9780521476959
- Time, Trinity and Church: A Response to the Theology of Robert Jenson (Eerdmans, 2000) ISBN 9780802838995
- The Practice of Theology: A Reader (SCM, 2002) edited with Murray Rae and Stephen Holmes ISBN 9780334028161
- The Theology of Reconciliation (T&T Clark, 2003) ISBN 9780567088895
- The Doctrine of Creation: Essays in Dogmatics, History and Philosophy (T&T Clark, 2004) ISBN 9780567085887

Academic offices
Preceded by Alister McGrath	Bampton Lecturer; 1992	Succeeded by Eric Heaton
