= Right Romania Alliance =

Electoral alliance in Romania

Right Romania Alliance Alianţa România Dreaptă
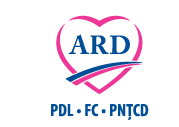
- Leader: Vasile Blaga; Aurelian Pavelescu; Mihai Răzvan Ungureanu
- Secretary-General: Gheorghe Flutur
- Vice Leader: Mihail Neamțu
- Founded: 16 September 2012
- Dissolved: 10 December 2012
- Ideology: Conservatism, Economic liberalism Reformism
- Political position: Centre-right
- European affiliation: European People's Party (EPP)
- International affiliation: Christian Democratic International (CDI)
- Slogan: Sus inima!

Website
- www.aliantaromaniadreapta.eu

The Right Romania Alliance (Romanian: Alianţa România Dreaptă, ARD, also translating to "Just Romania Alliance") was a Romanian electoral alliance formed between the Democratic Liberal Party (PDL), the Christian Democratic National Peasants' Party (PNȚCD), the Civic Force (FC) and supported by the Centre-right Civic Initiative founded by former independent Prime Minister Mihai Răzvan Ungureanu and other NGOs.

After a very short period of existence, lasting a little over three months, the alliance was legally dissolved on the background of the disastrous results in the legislative elections, as it was not a political, but only an electoral alliance.

== History ==
=== Background ===
In July 2012, former independent Prime Minister Mihai Răzvan Ungureanu formed the Centre-right Civic Initiative (ICCD). He said that he supported a political alliance for the parliamentary election of 2012. Representatives of the Democratic Liberal Party (PDL), in opposition, began negotiations with the ICCD, the New Republic Party (PNR), Christian Democratic National Peasants' Party (PNŢCD), and the Christian Democratic Foundation (DCF). PDL leader Vasile Blaga announced that the negotiations were successful.

On 30 August 2012, representatives of PDL, ICCD, PNŢCD, PNR, and FCD launched The Manifest of the United Right, that created the alliance. On 5 September 2012, the PNŢCD chairman, Aurelian Pavelescu announced that leaders determined that pole will be named Right Romania Alliance (ARD) and the logo will be a heart. On 7 September 2012, the National Convention of Civic Force (FC) elected Ungureanu as party leader. FC shortly joined the alliance, thereby replacing the ICCD (which was an NGO).

=== Short-lived existence ===
PNR has had problems registering as a political party and the FCD was not admitted into the alliance. Thus, on 15 September, representatives of PDL, PNŢCD, and FC have signed a protocol establishing the alliance, and a day later, the ARD has been registered at the Central Electoral Commission.

At the legislative election of 9 December 2012, ARD won 16.52% of votes to the Chamber of Deputies, 13.64% of votes to the Senate and 80 seats in the Parliament, which came to PDL (74 seats), FC (4 seats), PNȚCD (1 seat), and PNR (1 seat). On 10 December 2012, ARD was dissolved.

== Electoral history ==
=== Legislative elections ===
Election	Chamber			Senate			Position	Aftermath
Election	Votes	%	Seats	Votes	%	Seats	Position	Aftermath
2012	1,223,189	16.52	56 / 412	1,239,318	16.71	24 / 176	2nd ^{1}	Opposition to USL government (2012–2014)
2012	1,223,189	16.52	56 / 412	1,239,318	16.71	24 / 176	2nd ^{1}	Opposition to PSD-UNPR-UDMR-PC government (2014)
2012	1,223,189	16.52	56 / 412	1,239,318	16.71	24 / 176	2nd ^{1}	Opposition to PSD-UNPR-ALDE government (2014–2015)
2012	1,223,189	16.52	56 / 412	1,239,318	16.71	24 / 176	2nd ^{1}	Supporting the technocratic Cioloș Cabinet (2015–2017)

Notes:

^{1} Right Romania Alliance members: PDL (22 senators and 52 deputies), FC (1 senator and 3 deputies), and PNȚCD (1 senator and 1 deputy).
