= Civic Force =

Civic Force Forța Civică
- President: Mihai Răzvan Ungureanu
- Secretary-General: Ștefan Pirpiliu
- Founder: Viorel Lis
- Founded: 2004 (as Christian Party); 2008 (as PFC)
- Dissolved: 2014
- Merged into: Democratic Liberal Party
- Headquarters: Bucharest
- Youth wing: Civic Force Youth
- Pensioner's wing: Civic Force Pensioner League
- Ideology: Christian democracy
- National affiliation: Right Romania Alliance (2012)
- European affiliation: None
- International affiliation: None
- Colours: Blue and white

Civic Force (Romanian: Forța Civică, FC) was a political party in Romania. It was founded in 2004 by former Mayor of Bucharest Viorel Lis (formerly affiliated with the Christian Democratic National Peasants' Party or PNȚCD throughout his term). Its last president was former Prime Minister Mihai Răzvan Ungureanu, elected at the September 2012 party congress until 2014 when the party was absorbed by the Democratic Liberal Party (PDL).

== History ==
Civic Force (FC) was founded in 2004 by former Bucharest mayor, Viorel Lis (who was previously a member of the Christian Democratic National Peasants' Party or PNȚCD for short), under the name 'Christian Party' (Romanian: Partidul Creștin). In 2007, Adrian Iurașcu became the president of the party, after which the party adopted its current name. In 2009, FC ran for the European Parliament elections of that year, but failed to win any seats.

In 2012, former Prime Minister Mihai Răzvan Ungureanu was elected president. For the 2012 parliamentary elections, FC joined the Right Romania Alliance (ARD), an electoral alliance with other centre-right opposition parties, namely the Democratic Liberal Party (PDL) and the Christian Democratic National Peasants' Party (PNȚCD). Furthermore, the party also applied to become a member of the European People's Party (EPP). Through ARD's list during the legislative election held in that year, FC gained three deputy seats (more specifically Dan Cristian Popescu, Dănuț Culețu, and Cristian Roman) and a senator seat (namely party president Mihai Răzvan Ungureanu). Eventually, in July 2014, the Civic Force was absorbed by the Democratic Liberal Party (PDL).

== Notable former members ==
- Mihai Răzvan Ungureanu – president of Civic Force, senator 2012–2015, Prime Minister 2012, Minister of Foreign Affairs 2004–2007, former PNL member 2004–2007;
- Adrian Iurașcu – prime-vice-president of Civic Force, president of Civic Force 2007–2012, leader of CDR elected from civil society 1996–2000;
- Dan Cristian Popescu – vice-president of Civic Force, deputy 2012–present, president of PNL Sector 1 2007–2012 (expelled from PNL in 2012);
- Dănuț Culețu – president of Civic Force Constanța, deputy 2012–present, prefect of Constanța 2005–2009 (left PNL in 2010).

== Electoral history ==
=== Legislative elections ===
| Election | Chamber | | | Senate | | | Position | Aftermath |
| Election | Votes | % | Seats | Votes | % | Seats | Position | Aftermath |
|---|---|---|---|---|---|---|---|---|
| 2012 | 1,223,189 | 16.52 | 3 / 412 | 1,239,318 | 16.71 | 1 / 176 | 2nd (within ARD)^{1} | Opposition to USL government (2012–2014) |
| 2012 | 1,223,189 | 16.52 | 3 / 412 | 1,239,318 | 16.71 | 1 / 176 | 2nd (within ARD)^{1} | Opposition to PSD-UNPR-UDMR-PC government (2014) |

Notes:

^{1} Right Romania Alliance (ARD) members: PDL (22 senators and 52 deputies), Civic Force, and PNȚCD (1 senator and 1 deputy).

=== European elections ===
| Election | Votes | Percentage | MEPs | Position | EU Party | EP Group |
|---|---|---|---|---|---|---|
| 2007 | did not compete | | | | — | — |
| 2009 | 19,436 | 0.40% | 0 / 33 | 9th | — | — |
| 2014 | 145,181 | 2.60% | 0 / 32 | 9th | — | — |
