= Mihai Răzvan Ungureanu =

Romanian politician (born 1968)

Mihai-Răzvan Ungureanu PhD
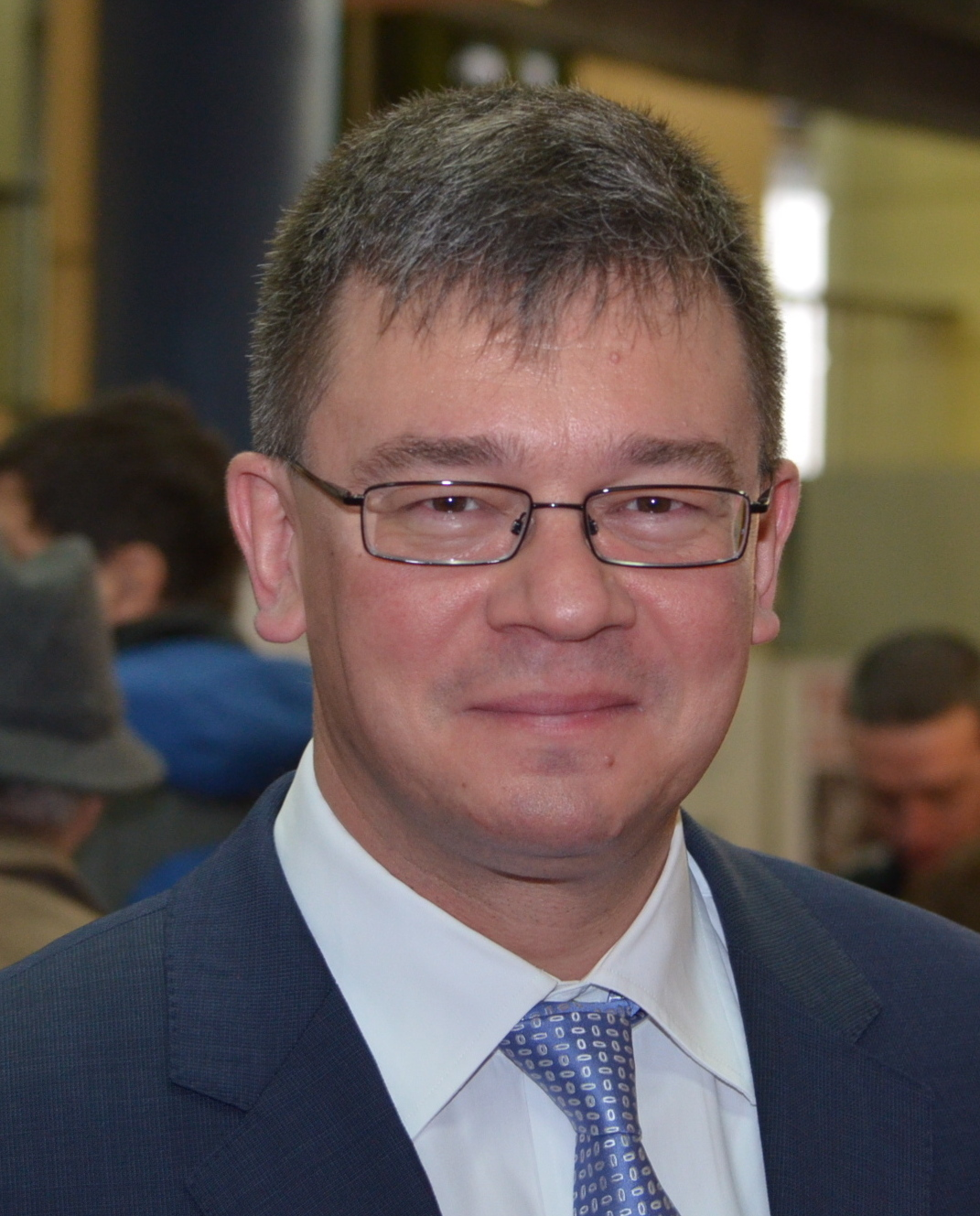
- Ungureanu in 2013

Prime Minister of Romania
- In office 9 February 2012 – 7 May 2012
- President: Traian Băsescu
- Deputy: Béla Markó
- Preceded by: Cătălin Predoiu (Acting); Emil Boc
- Succeeded by: Victor Ponta

Director of the Foreign Intelligence Service
- In office 5 December 2007 – 9 February 2012
- Preceded by: Silviu Predoiu (Acting)
- Succeeded by: Teodor Meleșcanu
- In office 30 June 2015 – 26 September 2016
- Preceded by: Silviu Predoiu (Acting)
- Succeeded by: Silviu Predoiu (Acting)

Minister of Foreign Affairs
- In office 28 December 2004 – 12 March 2007
- Prime Minister: Călin Popescu-Tăriceanu
- Preceded by: Mircea Geoană
- Succeeded by: Călin Popescu-Tăriceanu (Acting)

Member of the Senate of Romania
- In office 19 December 2012 – 1 July 2015

President of the Civic Force
- In office 7 September 2012 – 16 July 2014
- Preceded by: Adrian Iurașcu
- Succeeded by: Vasile Blaga (party merged with the Democratic Liberal Party)

Personal details
- Born: 22 September 1968 (age 58) Iași, Romania
- Party: None
- Other political affiliations: National Liberal Party (2004–2007); Civic Force (2012–2014); Democratic Liberal Party (2014); National Liberal Party (2014–2015)
- Children: 1
- Education: Alexandru Ioan Cuza University, Iași; St Cross College, Oxford
- Occupation: Professor, diplomat, politician
- Profession: Historian

Mihai Răzvan Ungureanu (Note: Romanian pronunciation: [miˈhaj rəzˈvan uŋɡuˈre̯anu]) (born 22 September 1968) is a Romanian historian, politician who served as Prime Minister of Romania in 2012. He was the foreign minister of Romania from 28 December 2004 to 12 March 2007, and he was appointed as Director of the Foreign Intelligence Service later in 2007. Following the resignation of the Emil Boc government, he was appointed prime minister serving through April 2012, when his cabinet was dismissed following a parliamentary vote of no-confidence. He was confirmed by the Parliament for a second term as Director of the Foreign Intelligence Service, after President Klaus Iohannis nominated him in June 2015, but he resigned in September 2016, citing health issues.

== Education ==
Ungureanu studied Maths and Physics at the Costache Negruzzi High School in Iași, where he graduated valedictorian in 1987. Ungureanu later studied History and Philosophy at the Alexandru Ioan Cuza University, where he graduated in 1992. From 1985 to 1989, Ungureanu was an alternate member of the Union of Communist Youth Central Committee, while between 1990 and 1992 he was a member of the university senate as a student representative. In 1993, Ungureanu obtained a master's degree at the Oxford Centre for Hebrew and Jewish Studies, an affiliated programme of St Cross College at the University of Oxford. In March 2004 he received a PhD degree from the Alexandru Ioan Cuza University after submitting a thesis on the "Conversion and integration in the Romanian society in the early-modern era".

== Professional career ==
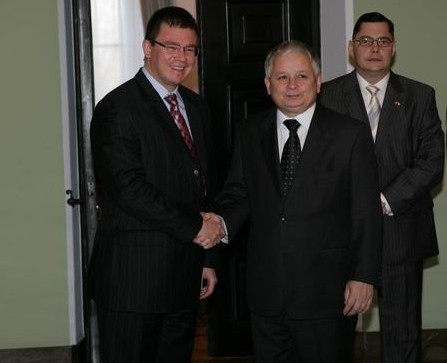
Mihai Răzvan Ungureanu and Lech Kaczyński in March 2007

Ungureanu was an assistant professor at the Alexandru Ioan Cuza University when he was recruited to the diplomatic service in 1998. He subsequently served as State Secretary in the Ministry of Foreign Affairs (1998–2000), and was a Vienna-based representative of the Stability Pact for South Eastern Europe (2000–2004).

A member of the National Liberal Party (PNL), part of the Justice and Truth Alliance (DA), Ungureanu became foreign minister after the candidate supported by the alliance, Traian Băsescu, won the presidential election. On February 2, 2007, Prime Minister Călin Popescu-Tăriceanu requested Ungureanu's resignation because Ungureanu had failed to inform the government about the detention of two Romanian workers by coalition forces in Iraq. On February 4, Ungureanu confirmed his resignation, Popescu-Tăriceanu said that Ungureanu would continue to act as foreign minister until the swearing in of a successor. On March 12, President Traian Băsescu signed a decree removing Ungureanu from his position.

=== Foreign Information Service tenure ===
On November 27, 2007, Băsescu nominated Ungureanu to head the Foreign Information Service (SIE), the directorship of which had been vacant since Claudiu Săftoiu's March 19 resignation, related to the same scandal in Iraq. A joint session of Parliament confirmed Ungureanu in his new position on December 5, with 295 of 318 MPs present voting in favour.

=== Prime minister ===
On February 6, 2012, Ungureanu was given a mandate by President Traian Băsescu to form a new government, which the Romanian parliament approved on February 9, 2012. Ungureanu vowed to continue reforms and promote Romania's economic and political stability amid the country's political crisis. As prime minister, Ungureanu had become the Democratic Liberal Party's probable candidate for the presidency when Băsescu's term expired in 2014, senior party members said, a move echoing Russia's President Boris Yeltsin's choice and promotion of Vladimir Putin. After two and a half months, Ungureanu's cabinet failed to pass a no-confidence vote introduced by the Social Liberal Union. Opposition leader Victor Ponta on 7 May 2012 replaced him as prime minister.

=== After prime ministership ===
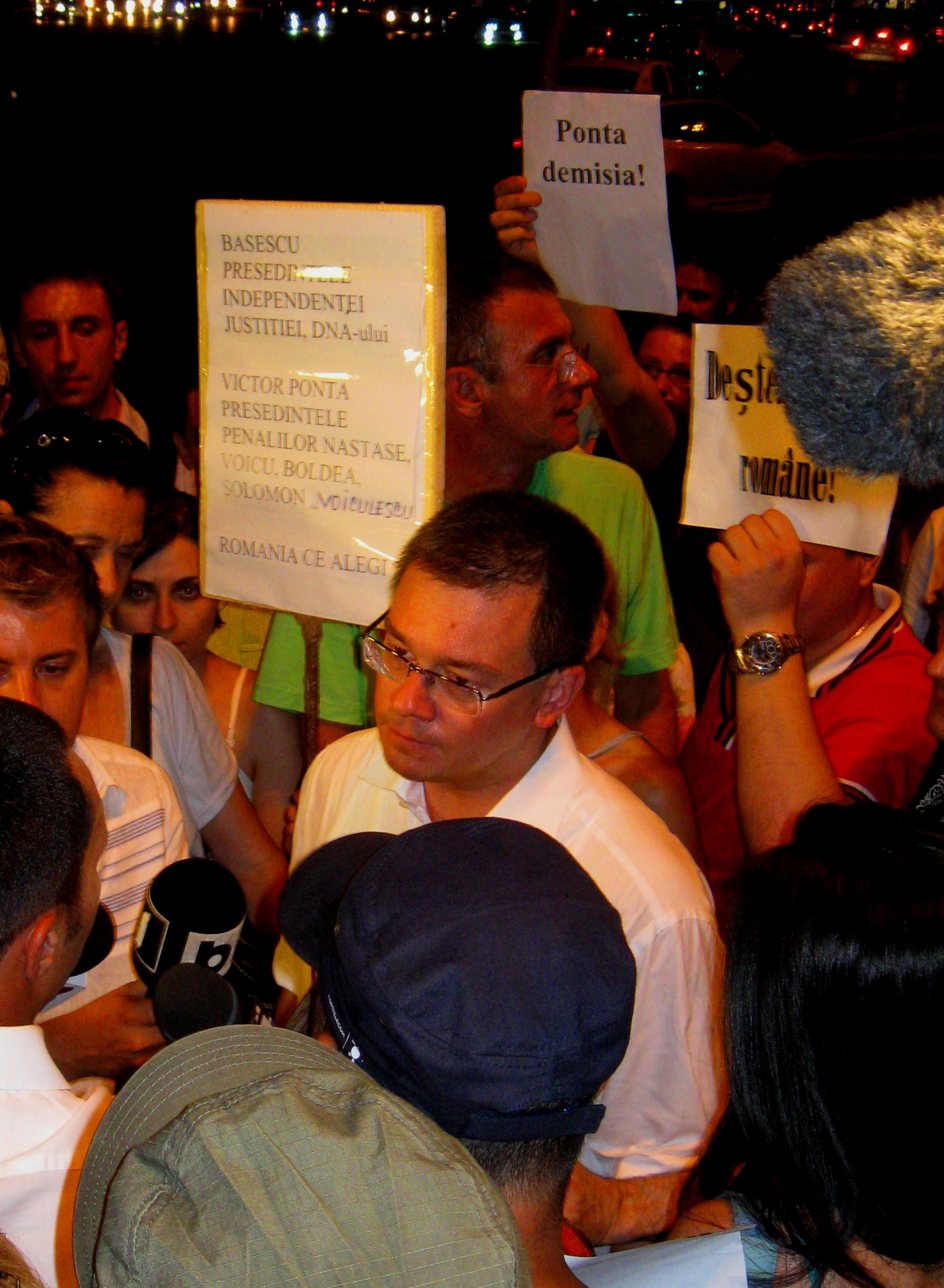
Mihai Răzvan Ungureanu at a protest against impeachment of President Traian Băsescu in July 2012

The political activity of Ungureanu after the premiership was intensive. In July 2012, he founded the non-governmental organization of Center-Right Civic Initiative (ICCD), together with PDL leaders Cristian Preda and Monica Macovei. He spoke about a political and electoral forces, without PNL. The alliance was founded in late August 2012 and include Democratic Liberal Party (PDL), Christian Democratic National Peasants' Party (PNȚCD), New Republic Party and Center-Right Civic Initiative. On 31 August, Ungureanu joined Civic Force (FC).

=== Civic Force leadership ===
Ungureanu was elected the Head of the party during The Civic Force party congress in September 2012. Civic Force Party (PFC) became the "electoral vehicle" of ICCD and replaced the ONG in Right Romania Alliance (ARD) membership. After the election, Ungureanu started a European tournee for the accession of PFC to European People's Party (EPP). On 11 September, he met with the Italian deputy and member of The People of Freedom (PdL), Claudio Scajola, the Mayor of Rome and Giovanni Battista Re, secretary of Holy See. They welcomed the formation of "an alliance of right in the opposition of left attacks".

Ungureanu reorganized the party, founding new branches of the PFC around the country. He has held discussions with the former Italian Prime Minister, Silvio Berlusconi, the President of EPP, Wilfried Martens, the Secretary-General of PdL, Angelino Alfano, the Secretary-General of Union for a Popular Movement, Jean-François Copé, and the leader of EPP europarliamentary group, Joseph Daul on the accession of Civic Force at EPP. According to him, the accession folder of the party was accepted and FC started the accession process.

Ungureanu won a seat in the Senate on ARD's party list in the 2012 elections.

== Personal life ==
Ungureanu is married and has one son. He is fluent in three foreign languages (English, French, and German) and he also reads Hungarian.

== See also ==
- Ungureanu cabinet

Government offices
Preceded by Silviu Predoiu; Acting	Director of the Foreign Intelligence Service; 2007–2012	Succeeded by Teodor Meleșcanu
Preceded by Silviu Predoiu; Acting	Director of the Foreign Intelligence Service; 2015–2016	Succeeded by Silviu Predoiu; Acting
Political offices
Preceded by Mircea Geoană	Minister of Foreign Affairs; 2004–2007	Succeeded by Călin Popescu-Tăriceanu; Acting
Preceded by Cătălin Predoiu; Acting	Prime Minister of Romania; 2012	Succeeded by Victor Ponta
Preceded by László Borbély	Minister of Environment and Forests; Acting; 2012	Succeeded by Attila Korodi
Party political offices
Preceded by Adrian Iurașcu	President of Civic Force; 2012–2014	Position abolished
