= 2012–2015 unrest in Romania =

Protests against civil unfairity

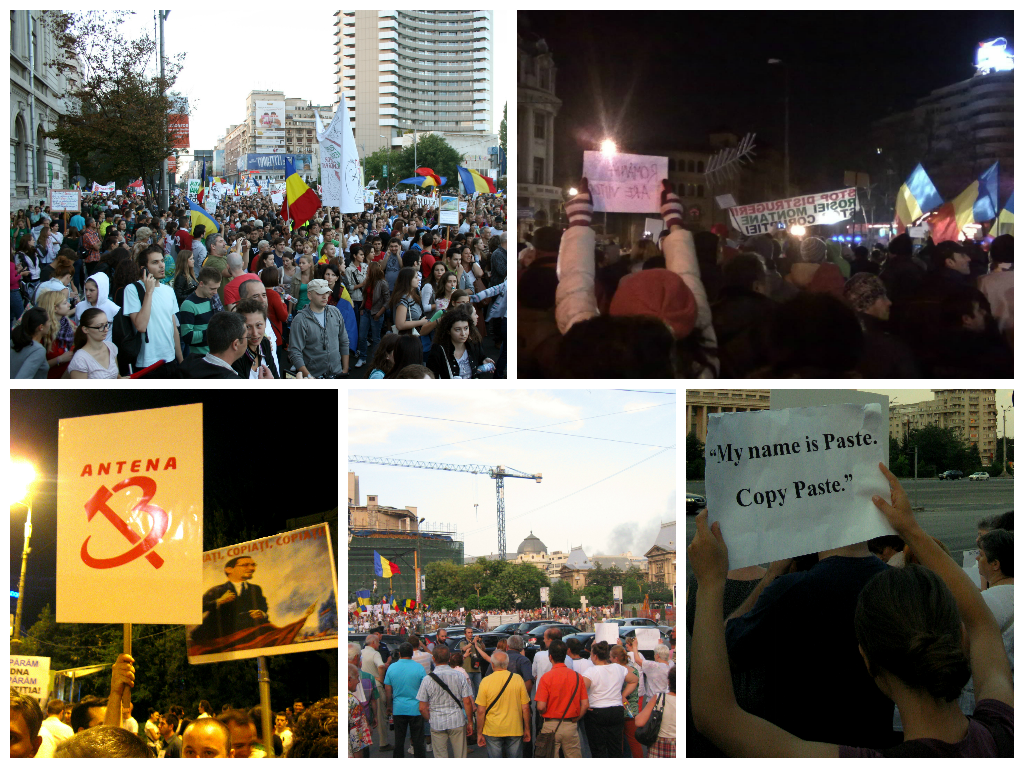
- Clockwise, from top: Protest against the Roșia Montană Project in Bucharest, demonstration against president Traian Băsescu in January 2012, protester holding a message against prime minister Victor Ponta, mass gathering in University Square against Băsescu, placards depicting messages against Ponta and Antena 3
- Date: 12 January 2012 – 4 November 2015 (3 years, 9 months and 23 days)
- Location: Dozens of cities in Romania and Romanian diaspora
- Caused by: High rate of unemployment; Tax hikes; Low standard of living; Political corruption; Shale drilling; Roșia Montană Project; Illegal felling of forests; Underfunding of education and health; Amendments to the Penal Code; Alleged involvement of politicians in justice; Parliamentary immunity; Irregularities concerning the 2014 presidential election; Colectiv nightclub fire
- Methods: Civil disobedience; Demonstration; Picketing; Sit-in; Rioting; Roadblock; Hunger strike; Labor strike; General strike; Human chain; Occupation; Revolt; Online activism
- Result: Resignation of second Boc cabinet; Resignation of Ungureanu cabinet; 2012 Romanian constitutional crisis; Suspension of President Traian Băsescu; Collapse of Social Liberal Union; Institutional conflict between the Government and the Presidency; Rejection of the Roșia Montană Project; Four reshuffles of Victor Ponta government; 2015 Romanian political crisis; Resignation of Prime Minister Victor Ponta

Parties
Christian Liberal Alliance; PMP–PNȚCD Alliance Anti-government protesters: Trade unions (SANITAS, Cartel ALFA, FSLI, FSPC, FNSA); Students; Teachers; Doctors; Postmen; Environmentalists; Pilots; Miners; Policemen; Unionist movements (Action 2012) Supporters of the autonomy of Székely Land	President of Romania	Government of Romania; PSD–UNPR– PC Alliance; Romanian Police; Romanian Gendarmerie Pro-government protesters

Lead figures
Emil Boc (PM, 2008–12); Crin Antonescu (PNL); Vasile Blaga (PNL); Alina Gorghiu (PNL); Elena Udrea (PMP); Mihai Răzvan Ungureanu (PM, 2012)	Traian Băsescu (2012-2014) Klaus Iohannis (2014-2015)	Victor Ponta (PM, 2012–2015); Liviu Dragnea (PSD); Gabriel Oprea (UNPR); Daniel Constantin (PC); Dan Voiculescu; Petre Tobă (Chief of the Romanian Police); Mircea Olaru (Chief of the Romanian Gendarmerie)

The 2012–2015 unrest in Romania refers to a prolonged period of civil unrest and political scandals in Romania, which took magnitude after the second half of the 2000s. The wave of civil demonstrations started in January 2012, once with the introduction of a new health reform legislation. The protests were fueled by the austerity measures applied in May 2010, but also by the unpopularity of Băsescu-backed Boc government. The demonstrations were characterized by widespread rioting and acts of vandalism. The political situation precipitated, so Prime Minister Emil Boc decided to step down on 6 February 2012.

In the first six months of the year, three governments have been changed. The summer of 2012 was marked by a large-scale political crisis, fed by accusations of plagiarism to PSD-backed Prime Minister Victor Ponta and culminating with the suspension of President Traian Băsescu. Although the presidential impeachment referendum showed that over 80% of the voters wanted his dismissal, the referendum was invalidated by the Constitutional Court due to presence below 50% at polls. During this period, Romania was warned by Western powers about the state of democracy, inasmuch as the dismissal of the presidents of the Senate and the Chamber of Deputies was made in a shady manner, and prominent figures of PSD, including Vice-President Liviu Dragnea, were accused of vote rigging in the referendum.

After sweeping victory in legislative election on 9 December 2012, Victor Ponta – supported by the Social Liberal Union – was named Prime Minister of Romania. His mandate was marked by corruption scandals and street protests. The demonstrations had various causes, among them the tax hikes, the exploitation of shale gas through hydraulic fracturing and the Roșia Montană Project. Hundreds of thousands of people, including doctors, teachers, students and laborers, took to the street to shout their dissatisfaction regarding his policies. Employees in transport and health system triggered several strikes in this period. Although mainly peaceful, the protests degenerated in some cases in clashes between demonstrators and law enforcers. Ponta Government was accused by national and international organizations of excessive use of force in the Revolt of Pungești. Ethnic Hungarians started a series of protests for the autonomy of Szeklerland, while the unionist movements (Action 2012) demanded the unification of Moldova and Romania, both in Romania and over the Prut.

In the winter of 2014, the ruling alliance collapsed, after internal tensions between PSD and PNL. The National Liberal Party left the alliance and merged with the Democratic Liberal Party to form the largest right-wing party in Romania in the post-revolutionary period. In the summer of the same year, Victor Ponta from PSD and Klaus Iohannis from PNL launched their candidatures for the presidential election. To everyone's surprise, ethnic German Klaus Iohannis won the election. Ponta's failure was mainly due to irregularities concerning the voting process in diaspora and numerous corruption scandals involving figures from the party he leads. During the electoral campaign, people protested against Victor Ponta and members of his government, inasmuch as thousands of Romanian citizens in diaspora were prevented from exercising their right to vote due to bad organization of the election process.

== Background ==
=== Social issues ===
Romania is the country with the highest poverty levels in the European Union. More than 30% of the population lives on less than $5 per day. In a report conducted by the Presidential Commission for the Analysis of Social and Demographic Risks is specified that there are visible discrepancies between social strata, privileged groups benefiting of higher wages and pensions in comparison with the rest of the population. Bankruptcy of many companies thickens the unemployment rate, in July 2013 reaching the value of 7.6%, highest since onset of the economic crisis in 2010. Other companies, including state companies – Romanian Post, Romanian Railways, are on the verge of bankruptcy, being forced to make cutbacks.

After application of drastic austerity measures in 2010, the Romanian economy recovered. Thus, in 2013, Romania recorded the highest economic growth in the EU. Despite this growth, the standard of living is decreasing, many Romanians being unable to endure everyday expenses. Poor working conditions, mass layoffs and tax hikes displease the population that is filling the squares of main cities to shout their grievances.

=== Political turmoil ===
Over the past 25 years, Romania has experienced a complex process of democratization with moments of crisis, economic stagnation, radical nationalism and extreme polarization. Despite Romania's admission into NATO in 2004, and into the European Union in 2007, the political situation remained unstable, with recurrent institutional clashes between the President, Prime Minister and Parliament, such as in 2007 and 2012 and tough austerity measures that fuelled social tensions.

== Timeline of the events ==
=== Mid-January 2012 riots ===
External media

Images
- Romania Protests 2012 on Flickr
- Romanian protests: In pictures on BBC
- GALERIE FOTO – Imagini din a treia zi de proteste în București on Mediafax

Video
- Molotov cocktails vs tear gas: New wave of Romania violence on YouTube
- Romania clashes video: Anti-cuts protests turn violent in Bucharest on YouTube
- 'We want him out': Anger burning in Romania on YouTube

These were the first events of the two-year civil unrest. They were triggered by the introduction of a new health reform legislation and worsening standard of life. President Traian Băsescu's popularity collapsed mainly after imposing austerity measures in 2010, year when Romania also confronted with short living but large street demonstrations. The attempted privatization of SMURD and the denigration by Traian Băsescu of Raed Arafat, its founder, was vehemently criticized by people on the streets.

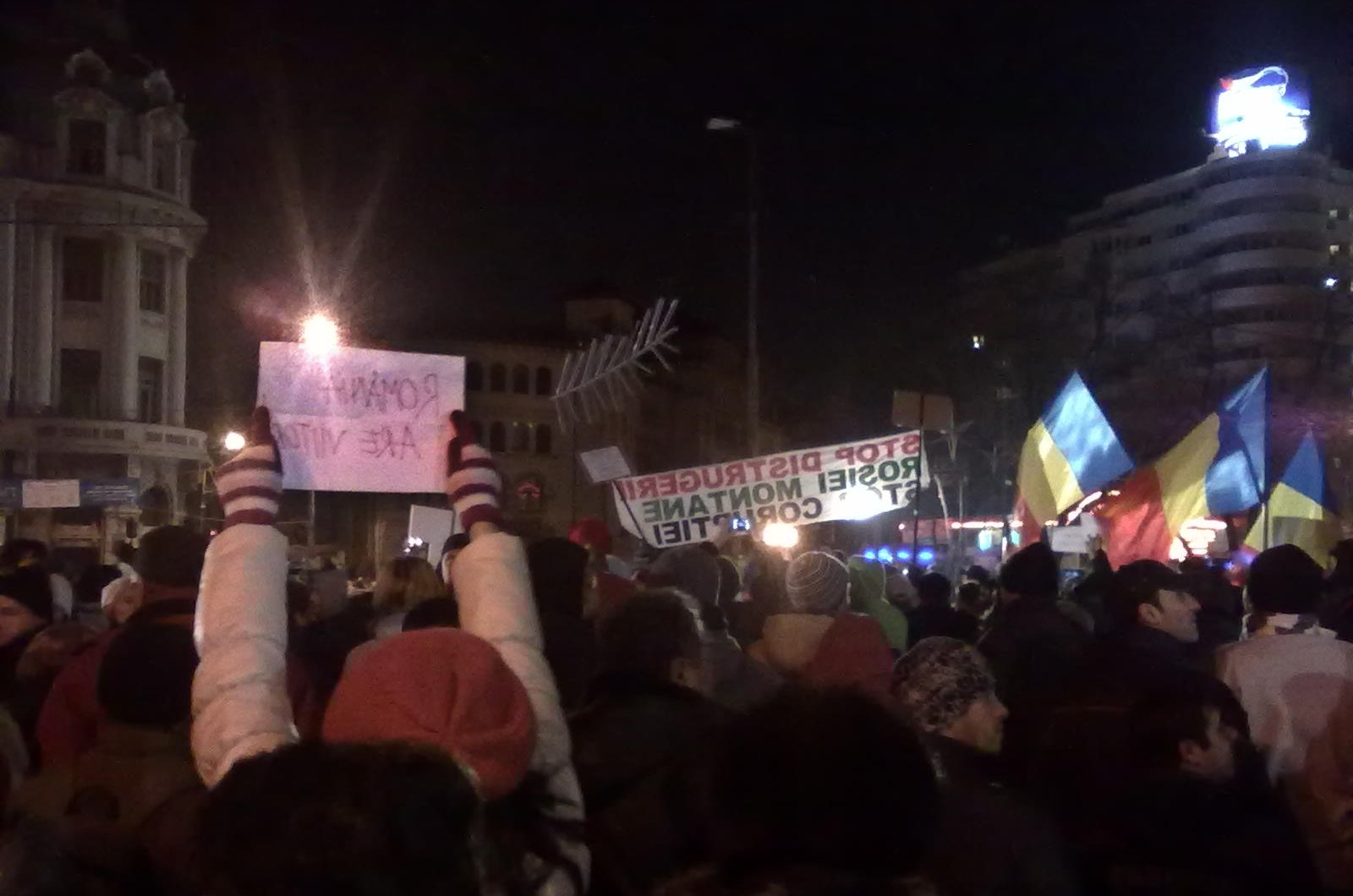
Large demonstration in Bucharest, on 15 January

The protests started with a 3,000-large demonstration in Târgu Mureș on 12 January, as a sign of solidarity with Raed Arafat. In the following weeks, protests spread to other sixty Romanian cities and dozens of cities in the Romanian diaspora. In Bucharest, the largest protest took place on 19 January, when up to 20,000 people expressed their disagreements with Băsescu regime. Several days, Bucharest faced widespread rioting and acts of vandalism. Thousands of policemen and gendarmes were deployed on the streets to confront angry demonstrators that stoned the vehicles of the law enforcers, vandalized shops and burned cars. Riot police used tear gas and flares to repel demonstrators who blocked traffic in the center of Bucharest. According to the Gendarmerie, destructions were caused by football ultras infiltrated among peaceful demonstrators. During these days of turmoil, several protesters entered the Romanian Television headquarters to blame the broadcaster for censorship. Official figures indicated over 60 injuries during clashes between police and protesters, while up to 283 arrests were made. Several journalists were injured while transmitting live the events. South East Europe Media Organisation, a NGO that has its headquarters in Vienna, expressed concern about the level of violence against reporters who covered the protests.

On the morning of 6 February 2012, Prime Minister Emil Boc announced his resignation, in an attempt "to ease the social situation". During weeks of protests, Băsescu stated nothing and did not appear in public. Emil Boc was replaced by Mihai Răzvan Ungureanu, former Director of the Foreign Intelligence Service.

=== 2012 political crisis ===
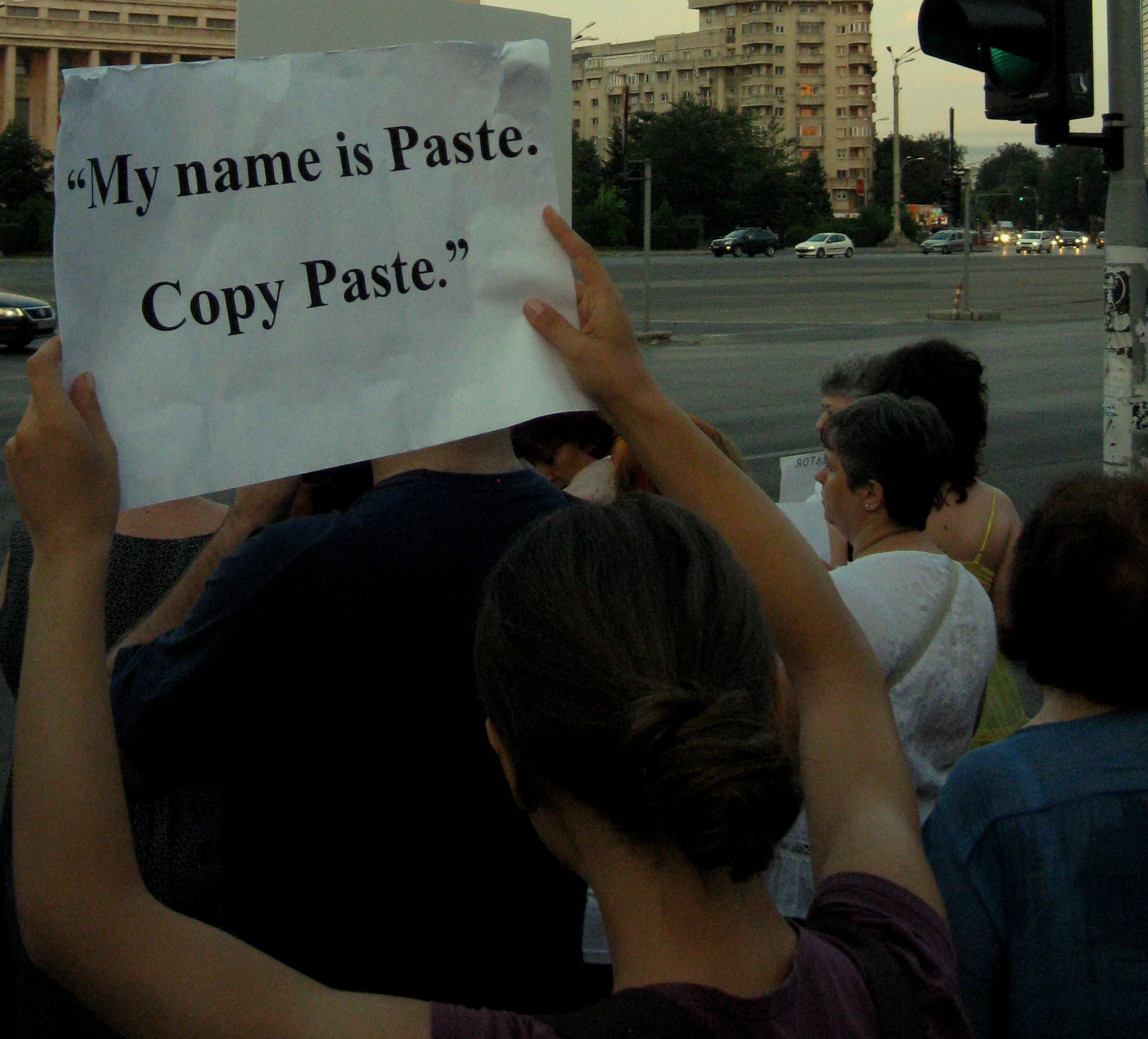
Protest against Victor Ponta in Victory Square, Bucharest. The placard reads My name is Paste. Copy Paste – a satire of Ponta as a plagiarist. The phrase was coined by The Economist and became widely used among Ponta's opponents.

Soon after government led by Mihai Răzvan Ungureanu fell in no confidence vote, Victor Ponta took in office. Ponta is an ardent Băsescu's opponent. In June 2012, they were the protagonists of a major political crisis, starting with conflicting views on Romania's representative to the European Council reunion of 28 June and escalating with the suspension of President Traian Băsescu. In the same period, Prime Minister Victor Ponta was accused of plagiarism in his doctoral thesis. These accusations fed the political instability.

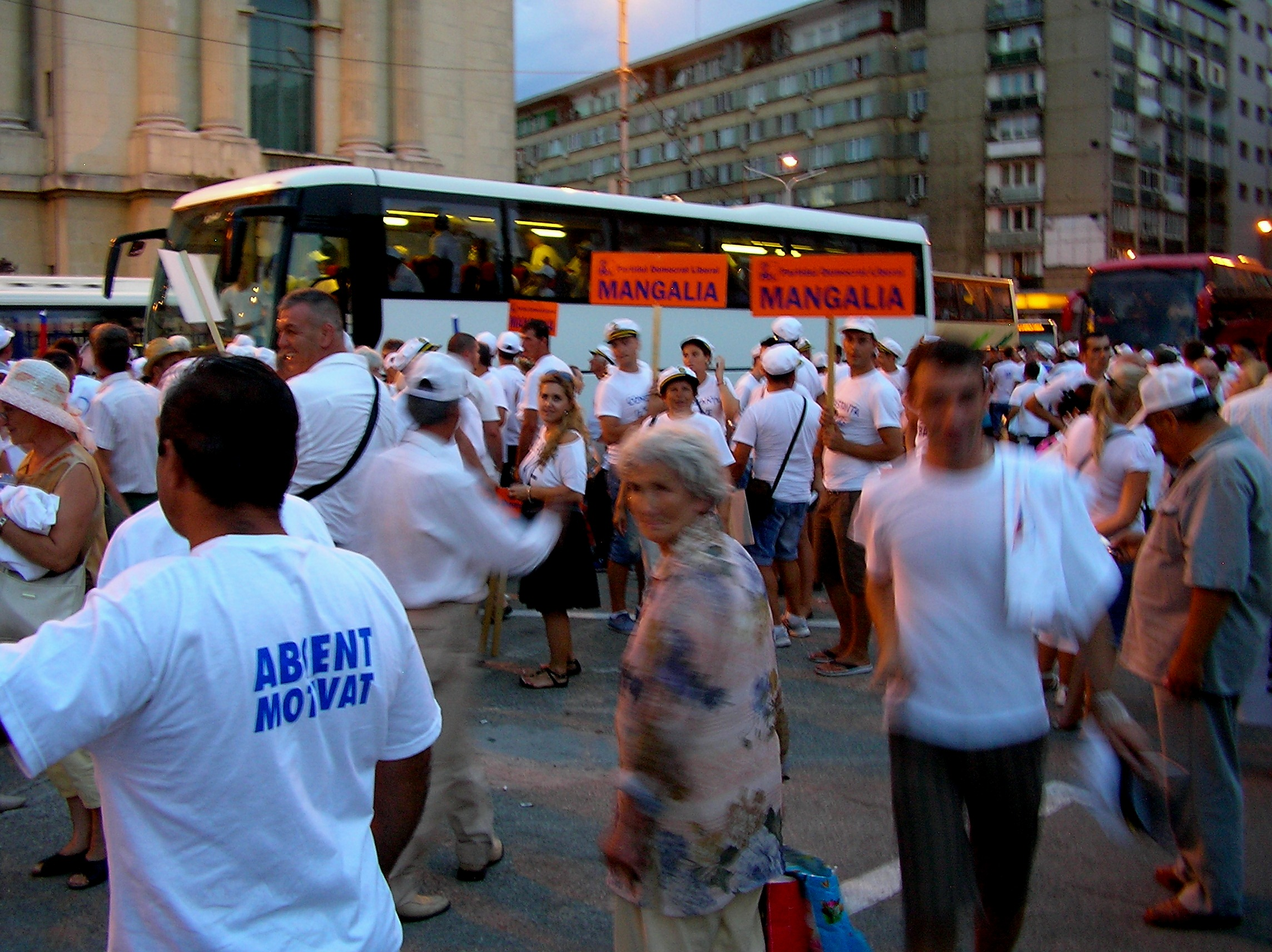
People arriving with buses at a protest in Revolution Square, Bucharest, on 26 July 2012

On 3 July, the Romanian Parliament, at the proposal of majority represented by Social Liberal Union, voted the dismissal of President of the Senate and President of the Chamber of Deputies. Through an Emergency Ordinance, the government restricted the attributions of the Constitutional Court, restoring them to the 2010 status. Likewise, USL leaders Victor Ponta and Crin Antonescu started procedures to dismiss President Traian Băsescu. These measures irritated the international politicians which expressed concerns over the state of democracy and the rule of law in Romania. On 6 July, Băsescu was suspended after the impeachment motion filed by the ruling coalition passed the Parliament's vote. The motion passed with 256 votes, 39 more than the minimum required. USL leaders argued their action by saying that President Traian Băsescu has breached the Constitution and overstepped his authority.

On 9 July, the Constitutional Court ascertained President Băsescu's suspension and confirmed Crin Antonescu as Interim President. Therewith, Constitutional Court rejected complaints formulated by Vasile Blaga and Roberta Anastase, supported by PDL, regarding removal from office of President of the Senate and President of the Chamber of Deputies. On 20 July, USL laid down, at the Office of the High Court of Cassation and Justice, a penal complaint against suspended President Traian Băsescu and other 14 people, for "spreading false information, for defamation of the country and the nation and for endangering safety of the national economy and currency stability", given that Băsescu cataloged the events as a "coup d'état". In the following days, Crin Antonescu cut Băsescu's special phone line, after the Senate's Defence Committee found out that the Special Telecommunication Agency illegally deployed the secret phone line at Băsescu's office. Băsescu accused USL of dismantling all national security institutions and cataloged them as "a gang of traitors".

The presidential impeachment referendum took place on 29 July. On 21 August, the Constitutional Court decided that the referendum is invalid due to presence under 50%. However, 87.52% of those present in the referendum voted for Băsescu's impeachment. PDL boycotted the referendum, while the Hungarian Prime Minister Viktor Orbán exhorted ethnic Hungarians in Romania to stay away from the polls, fact that explains the low turnout in Hungarian majority counties of Harghita and Covasna. There were rumors regarding vote rigging. In October 2013, Deputy Prime Minister Liviu Dragnea and 74 others were accused of falsifying data to sway the vote's outcome. On 22 April 2016, Liviu Dragnea was sentenced to two years probation.

==== Related protests ====
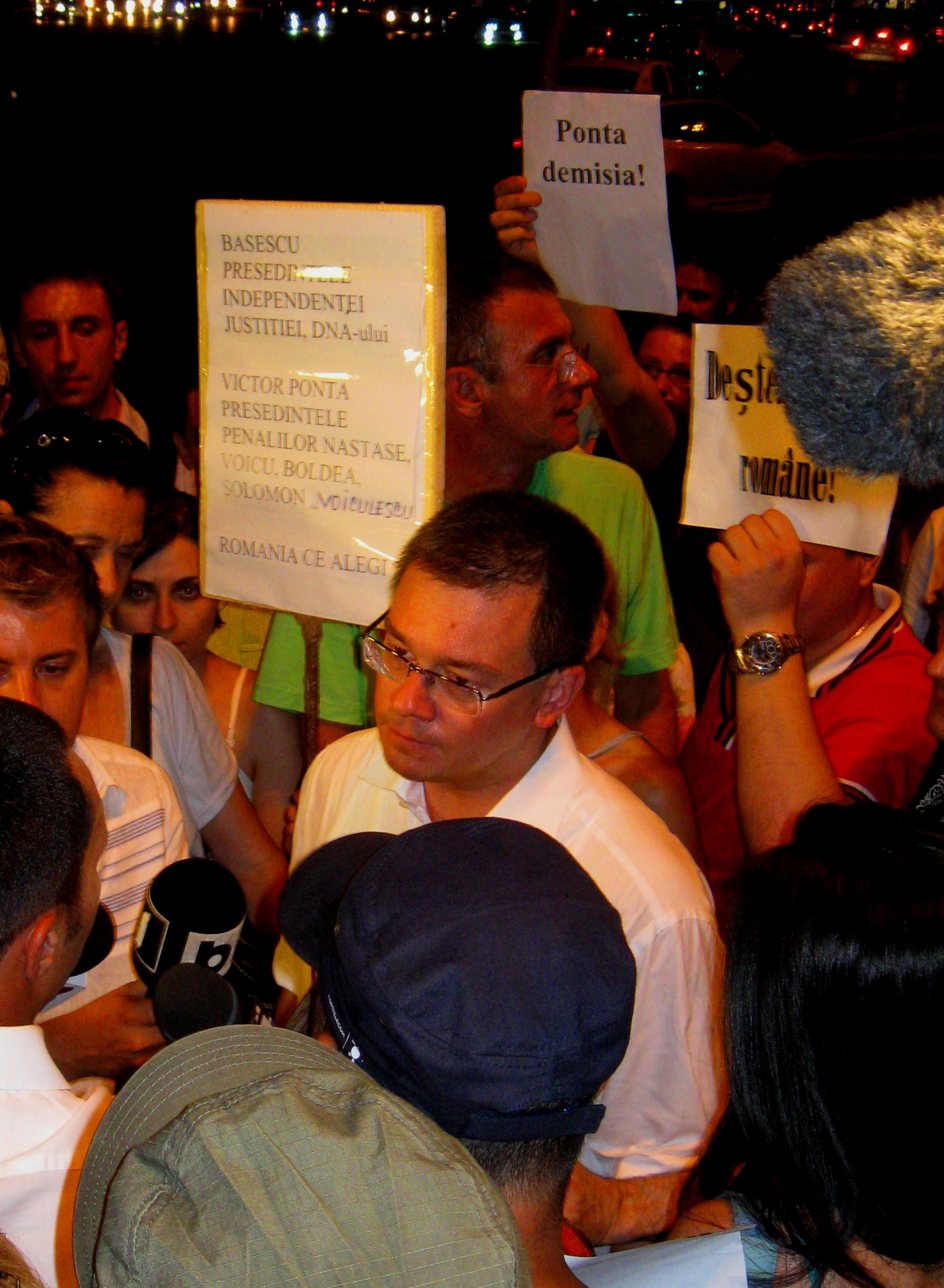
Mihai Răzvan Ungureanu at a protest in Victory Square on 6 July

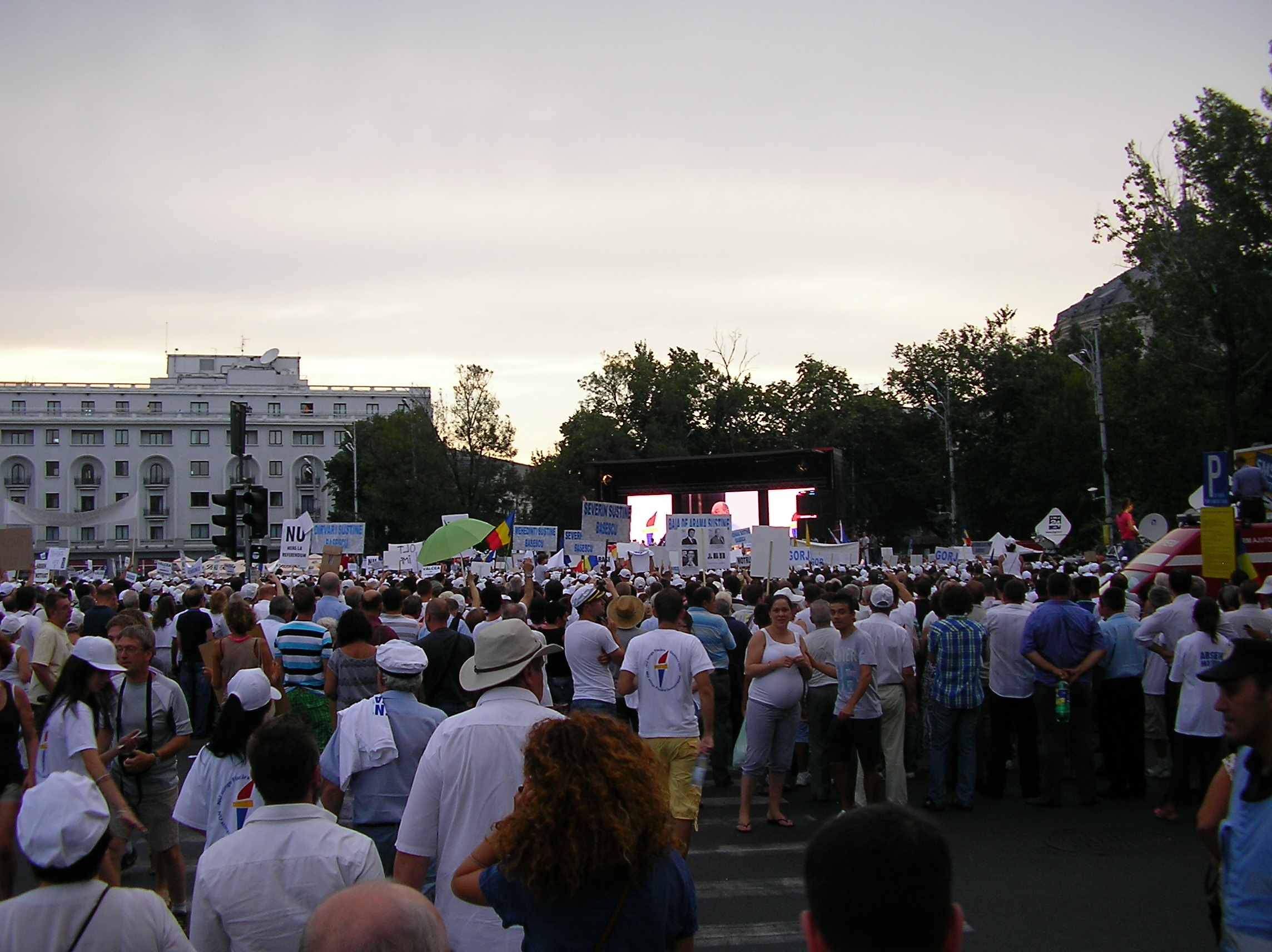
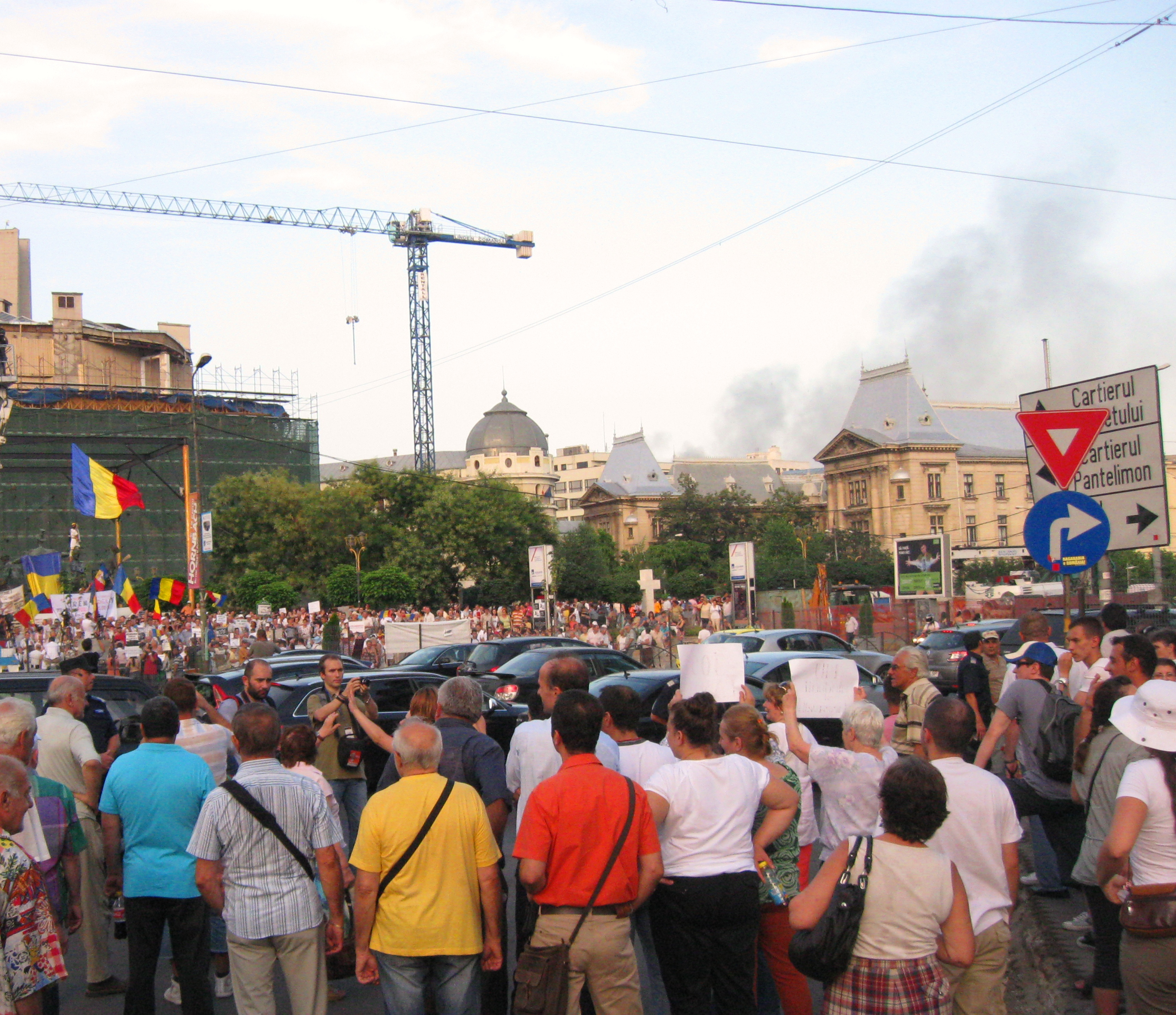
Pro- (left) and anti-Băsescu (right) demonstrations in Bucharest

The summer of 2012 in Romania was marked not only by political instability, but by civil unrest. In early July, on the background of plagiarism scandal, demonstrations took place in several locations in Bucharest. The demonstrations, entitled suggestively the "Protest of inverted commas" (Romanian: Protestul ghilimelelor), were attended by hundreds of people, among them former Prime Minister Ungureanu, aiming Victor Ponta's resignation.

In the pre-referendum period, several demonstrations in support of President Traian Băsescu took place throughout the country. In Arad and Timișoara, clashes between pro- and anti-Băsescu demonstrators erupted, but were quickly dispersed by gendarmes. On 6 July, 2,000 people gathered at a rally in Bucharest to support President Băsescu. The rally was attended by prominent members of PDL and degenerated towards evening in altercations with anti-Băsescu demonstrators that infiltrated among supporters of the president.

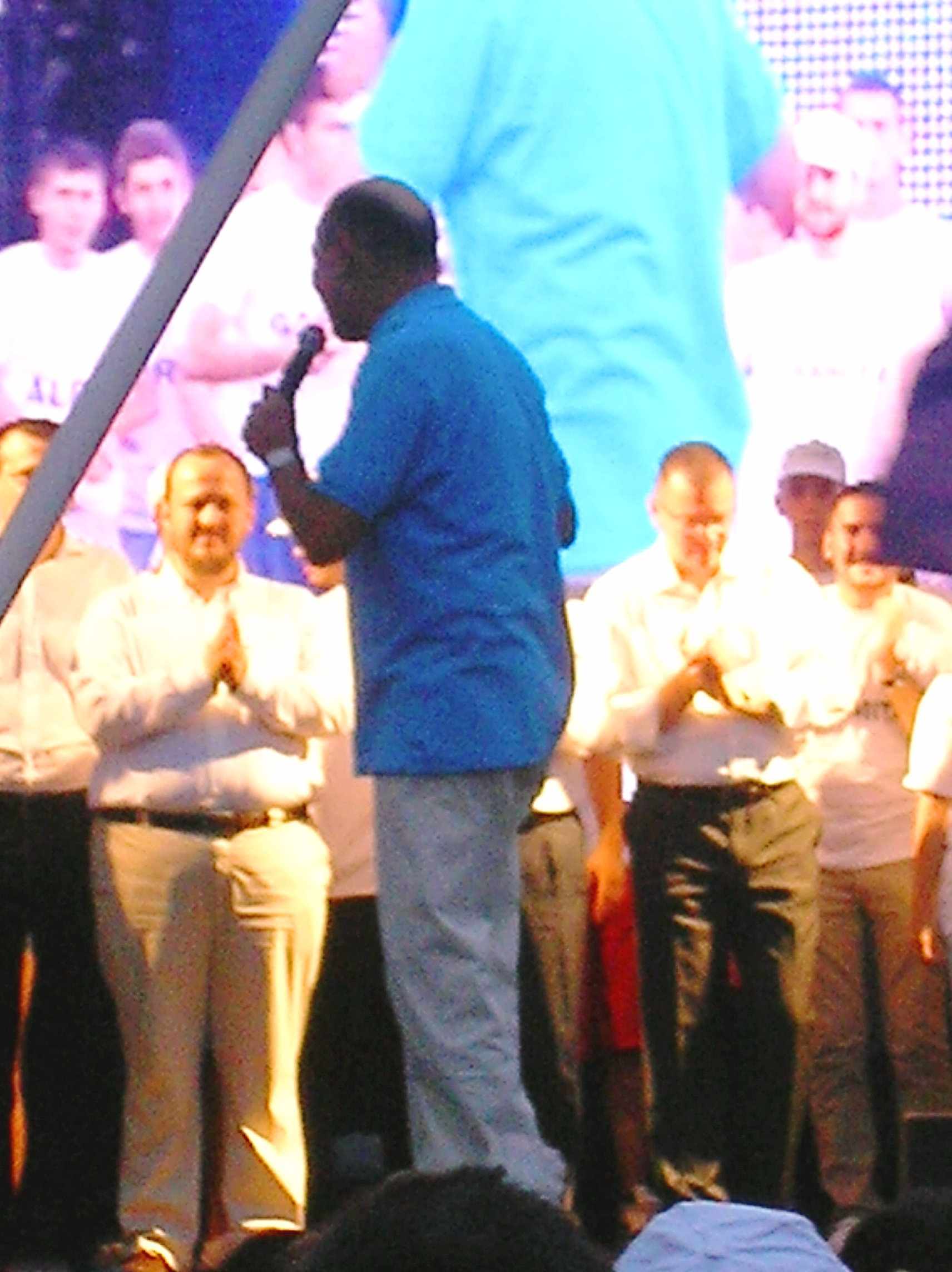
Traian Băsescu speaking in his support at an anti-impeachment protest in Revolution Square, Bucharest

Major political rallies were organized by USL in the most important cities in the country, within the campaign to dismiss the suspended president: Bucharest (50,000 participants, 26 July), Craiova (18,000 participants, 20 July), Iași (15,000 participants, 22 July), Oradea (8,000 participants, 24 July), Pitești (7,000 participants, 25 July), Brașov (5,000 participants, 17 July), Alexandria (1,500 participants, 25 July) and Râmnicu Vâlcea (700 participants, 27 July). On the other side, large pro-Băsescu meetings were organized in several Romanian cities, at different dates, to avoid potential conflicts between demonstrators: Bucharest (15,000 participants), Iași (10,000 participants), Cluj-Napoca (10,000 participants), Slatina (100 participants).

Invalidation of the referendum infuriated Băsescu's opposers that gathered in their thousands in front of the Bucharest National Theatre. Protesters shouted messages against CCR decision to invalidate the referendum and asked Traian Băsescu to resign. Likewise, many people have come up with anti-US placards, considering that Băsescu was reinstated at Americans desire. Towards evening things got out of control, people breached fences and entered on the carriageway, blocking traffic. Next day, the Gendarmerie fined or queried 106 people for disturbing public peace and destruction of public domain.

=== 2013 social protests ===
Worsening working conditions, mass layoffs and poor payroll have taken to the streets thousands of employees even in the early days of 2013. Probably the most dramatic and publicized case is Oltchim Râmnicu Vâlcea, one of the largest chemical companies in Romania. The company recorded losses of €90.3 million in the fourth quarter of 2011, thus ending the year with a negative result of 270 million lei. The company's leadership was forced to reduce expenses and liabilities, even without announcing employees. The deplorable situation of the company triggered mass unrest, also fueled by several failed attempts to privatize the plant. Protests took place throughout the year, one of the largest being organized on 28 March, when nearly 1,500 employees refused to start work and blocked the traffic on national road DN64. The unrest escalated with the storming of company's headquarters on 4 July, while in the subsequent months, some employees launched a hunger strike.

==== CFR crisis ====
The deplorable situation of the national railway company took to the streets thousands of employees under the threat of job loss or salary reduction. In 2013 and 2014, the company was shaken by two major strikes. On 16 January 2013, thousands of employees triggered a spontaneous strike, 138 trains being blocked for several hours in major railway stations in the country, including Bucharest, Craiova, Cluj-Napoca, Iași, Galați and Constanța. The Minister of Transport Relu Fenechiu said that he will make an analysis and those responsible will pay.

A larger strike took place on 23 April 2014, when, for two hours, rail traffic was paralyzed in major train stations in the country. According to syndicalists, the protest took place after failed negotiations on a new collective agreement. About 400 passenger trains and 200 freight trains stood in the stations or on route.

==== Protests of teachers and students ====
Protests and strikes were launched by teachers and students throughout the year, centered mainly on Ponta's poor policies regarding education. They claim that the education system is underfunded and require allocation of at least 6% of GDP to education. High school students also protested for bad settlement of commuting subscriptions.

On 21 May, over 2,000 students in Covasna County went on Japanese strike, inasmuch as the Ministry of Education has not settled, since October 2012, money for commuting subscriptions. Those 2,000 students that went on Japanese strike, wearing white banderoles on arm, are from 15 high schools in the cities of Sfântu Gheorghe, Târgu Secuiesc, Covasna and Baraolt. Furthermore, students in Covasna organized a protest meeting. The Ministry of Education has accumulated, from October to March, a debt of more than 1.6 million lei for settlement of students commuting subscriptions in Covasna County. Likewise, around 150 students from high schools throughout the Mureș County went on indefinitely Japanese strike, in solidarity with the colleagues which were not settled money for commuting subscriptions. The same measure of protest was adopted by hundreds of students in Constanța County, according to that were violated the rights under the Education Act through art. 84 (3). In Cluj County, Ministry of Education did not settle any money for seven months. Accumulated debts amount to more than 3.5 million lei, 3,100 commuter students being affected by this situation.

On 13 November, thousands of students from 11 universities in Bucharest, Timișoara, Cluj-Napoca, Iași, Constanța, Galați, Baia Mare, Sibiu, Suceava, Oradea and Alba Iulia took to the streets to protest the underfunding of the education system. In solidarity with the students, pupils from dozens of schools and high schools went on Japanese strike. Students chanted slogans against the Government and demanded allocation of 6% of GDP for education: "We want a school for all, not a Government of mobsters", "Finance the education or leave the Government". According to the Romanian press, the event is one of the largest student movements in recent years.

Teachers' wages is a problem wherewith the education system confronts. In Romania, a teacher is paid 9.3 lei net (2.09 euros) per hour, compared to other European countries, where wages are up to 40 times higher.

In May 2015, starting from Timișoara, Galați and Constanța, students have occupied university amphitheatres, protesting "the disaster in academic environment and the lack of respect with which students were treated in decisions regarding the higher education system". Triggered by the National Alliance of Student Organizations in Romania, After failed negotiations with the Minister of Education Sorin Cîmpeanu, protests spread to other universities in Bucharest, Iași, Cluj-Napoca, Reșița, Oradea and Suceava. Students are also dissatisfied with university tuition fees, invoking a university dropout rate of 40%. The events are known in Romanian press as Occupy University.

==== Doctors' strike ====
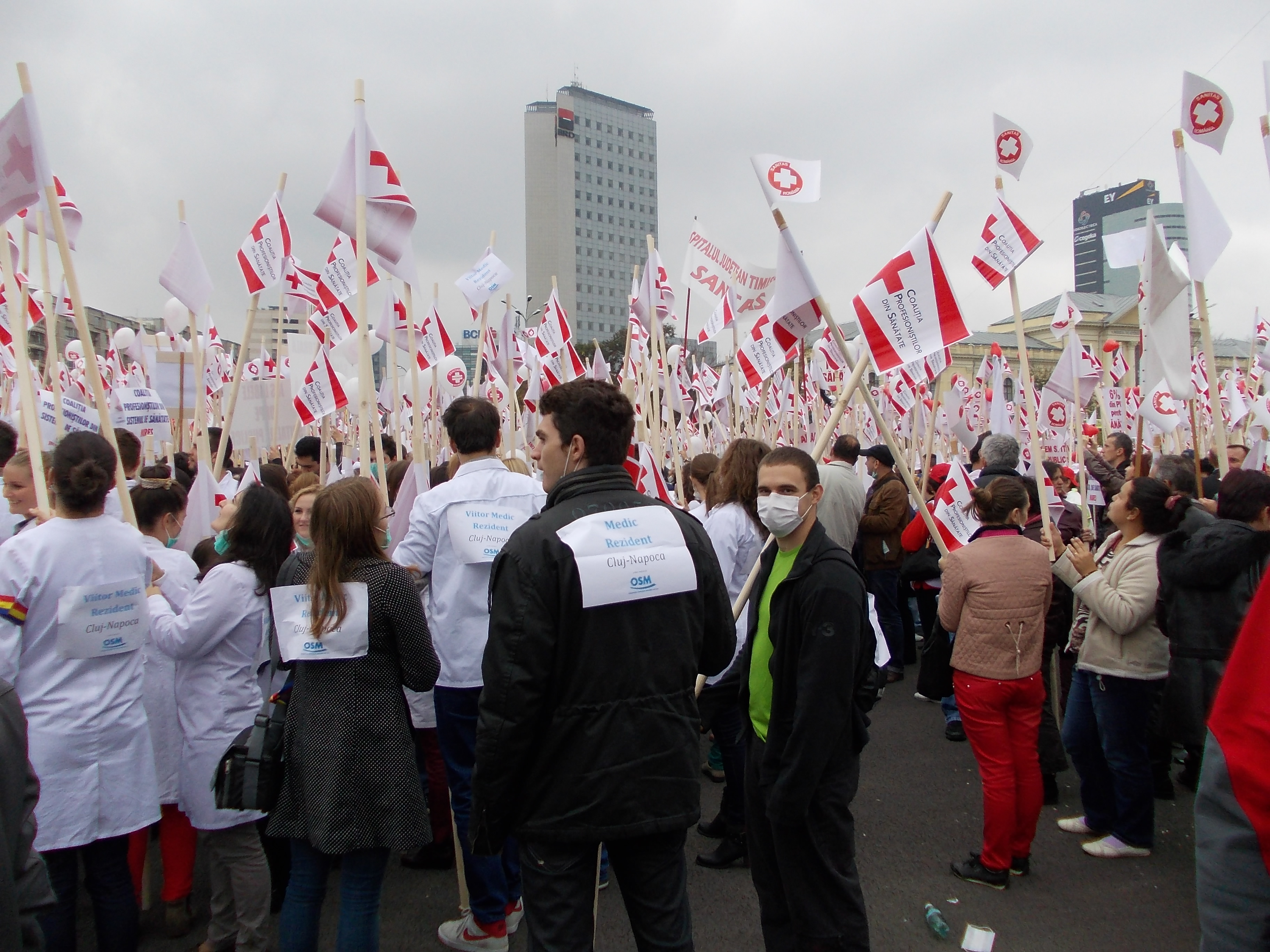
March of Silence, 2 November

Situation in hospitals, poor payroll and lack of staff pushed the doctors to launch an ample program of protests aimed to alarm the minister Eugen Nicolăescu over collapse of Romanian health system. In September were held for two weeks picketings in front of the Ministry of Health and the Ministry of Finance. The protests are the largest since 1998 and are known in local media as "Protest of white robes" (Romanian: Protestul halatelor albe).

On 2 November, nearly 7,000 doctors, nurses and dentists marched on Victory Avenue, towards the Palace of the Parliament. The manifestation, called "March of Silence" (Romanian: Marșul Tăcerii), was joined by medical staff across the country. Demonstrators leaned against the wall of the Palace of the Parliament a cross and nearly 20 wreaths, thus suggesting the "death of health" in Romania.

After three rounds of failed negotiations with the Minister of Health, on 25 November, more than 130,000 health professionals from across the country have triggered a warning strike between 8 and 10 o'clock. During this time, polyclinics were closed, and hospitals operated only in medical emergencies. Marius Sepi, first vice-president of Sanitas Federation, stated that the strike was affected by some hospital managers that threatened the protesters. Even the Minister of Health, Eugen Nicolăescu, considered the strike illegal and said he did not know if it is possible to increase wages.

Despite major changes on Romanian political scene in early 2014, the new health minister could not cope with the demands of health professionals. In this regard, doctors picketed between 23 June and 4 July the headquarters of Ministry of Health, Ministry of Labour and Ministry of Public Finance.

==== Duty of 7 cents ====
There was a rough dispute between President Băsescu and Premier Ponta on fuel price rise by 7 cents, measure adopted since 1 April 2014. The head of state asked Victor Ponta to waive the fee he deems an unnecessary and discriminatory tax burden. Likewise, Traian Băsescu is convinced that the measure will lead to tax evasion. The measure was also criticized by opposition. Thus, on 15 March, between 8,000 and 10,000 people, members or supporters of the People's Movement Party, protested in Bucharest's George Enescu Square against Ponta's poor economic policies and wave of taxes that will be introduced once with 1 April. Romania figures among the countries with the most expensive gasoline in the world, at $7.38 per gallon (€1.41 per litre).

Protests related to fuel overtaxing also took place a few months before the implementation of this measure. On 9 December 2013, over 86,000 lorry drivers across the country went on strike and blocked for several hours the traffic on ring roads of major cities.

=== Protests against the Roșia Montană Project ===
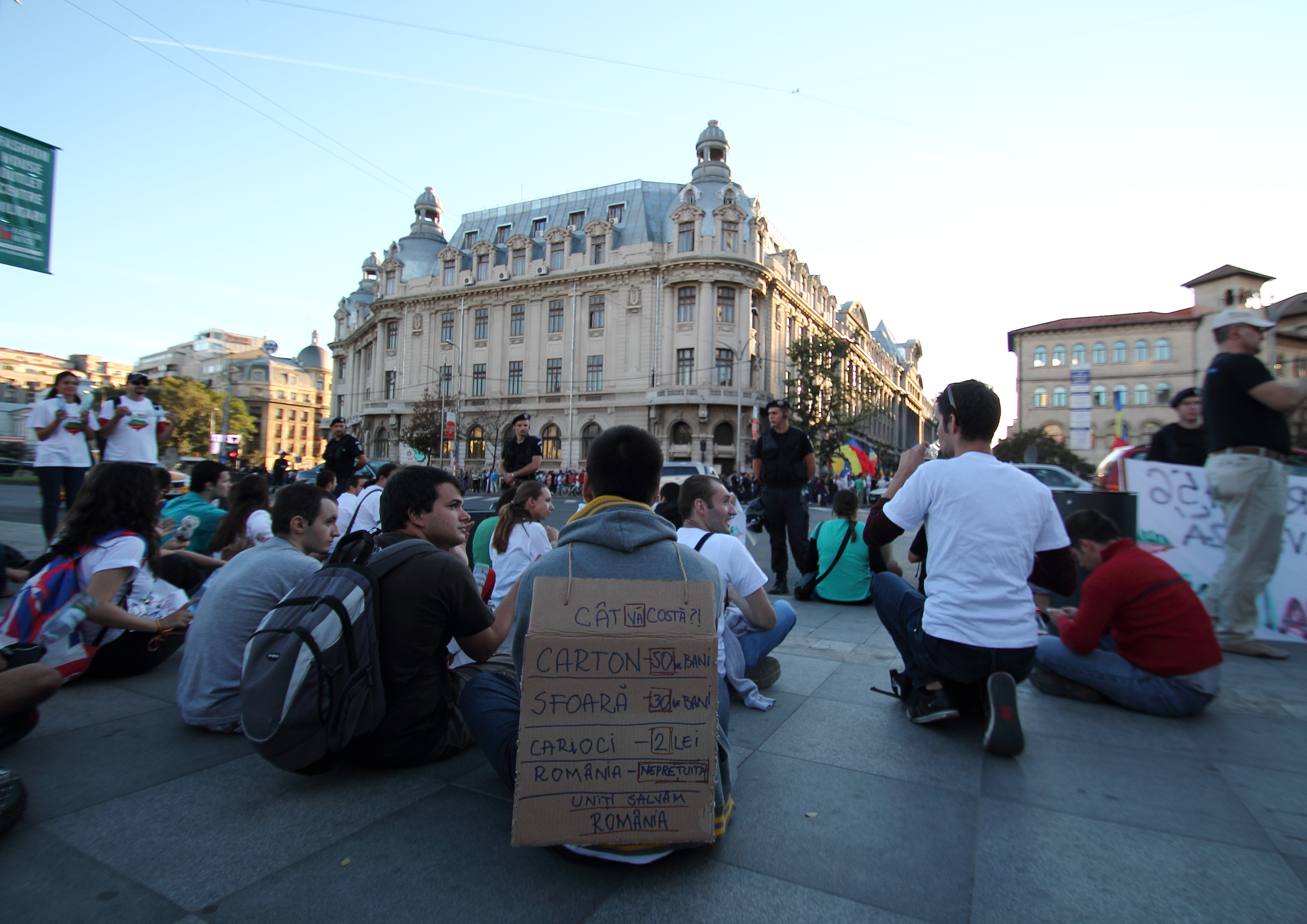
A sit-in in University Square, Bucharest

The Roșia Montană Project, a mining project aimed to bring to the surface 350 tonnes of gold and 1,500 tonnes of silver, met a significant resistance from environmental groups in Romania and neighbouring countries. Among the dissatisfactions of environmentalists are the pollution by cyanidation and the extremely low percentage of which Romania will benefit from this exploitation. A concern was that the legislation would give the Roșia Montană Gold Corporation the right to give compulsory purchase orders to the residents of Roșia Montană who refused to sell their houses and lands. The draft law also sets time limits for the state authorities to grant all permits, regardless of potential infringements of national legislation or of court rulings.

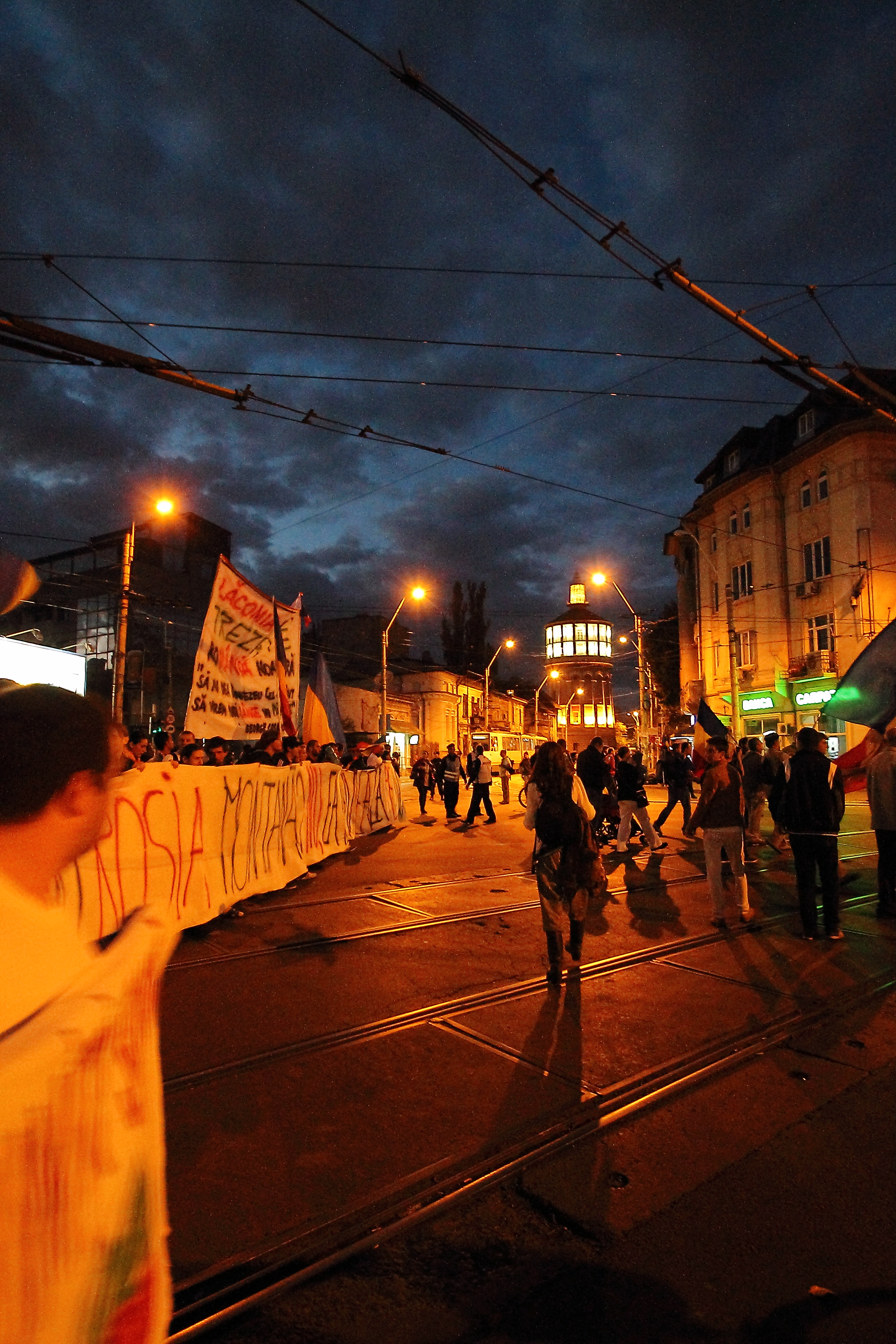
Protesters blocking traffic near Foișorul de Foc, Bucharest

The wave of protests started on 1 September 2013 with a national mobilization and continued until late-December. The protests attracted up to 200,000 demonstrators in 50 Romanian cities and 30 cities in Romanian diaspora. Largest demonstrations were organized in Bucharest (20,000 people), Cluj-Napoca (10,000 people), Câmpeni (4,000 people), and Iași (1,500 people). In Bucharest, Timișoara and Iași, protesters created "tent cities", paralyzing traffic on major arteries of circulation. The protests, dubbed by international media the "Romanian Autumn", have taken many forms: human chains around the Palace of the Parliament, flash mobs, roadblocks and scuffles with police. Although the protests were mainly peaceful, there were reports of serious incidents. On 13 September, Minister of Culture Daniel Barbu was attacked with tomatoes in Cluj-Napoca. In November, protesters in Bucharest, Brașov and Cluj-Napoca were aggressed and sprayed with irritant substances by gendarmes, in the capital 62 people being fined for blocking traffic. Likewise, on 9 December, about 50 Greenpeace activists from 10 countries who were protesting in the courtyard of the Parliament building, were seized by gendarmes and led to the police stations. Protesters also accused the poor coverage of the protests by Romanian media.

There were also protests in support of the mining project. Organized only in the exploitation area, the largest protest attracted up to 5,000 locals and 33 miners blocked underground, who were fighting for the jobs promised by Roșia Montană Gold Corporation, inasmuch as the unemployment rate in the area is very high. In an attempt to defuse the tense situation of Roșia Montană, Prime Minister Victor Ponta descended into the underground to discuss with miners. However, during massive protests against Roșia Montană Project, Ponta – main target of protests – did not conduct any conversation with the representatives of the protesters.

=== "Black Tuesday" and subsequent protests ===
The Chamber of Deputies passed, on 10 December 2013, a draft law containing multiple amendments to the Penal Code, which would grant "super-immunity" to MPs and the president, as they would be taken out of the "public servant" category stipulated in the Code. Moreover, the amendments would protect politicians from the investigation of bodies of anti-corruption struggle (National Anticorruption Directorate, National Integrity Agency) and would remove the conflict of interest from the list of misdemeanors. After the Romanian Parliament passed the amendments, media outlets marked the day as the "Black Tuesday" of Romanian democracy.

On 14 December, nearly 1,500 people attended a meeting organized by People's Movement Party, in sign of protest against new Penal Code. The next day, a similar protest took place in Bucharest and was attended by more than 2,000 people. Unlike the previous, this was more violent. A large number of police forces were deployed on the spot. They formed cordons to prevent protesters moving towards the Government headquarters. Angry crowd broke the cordons, and gendarmes used tear gas to avoid blocking traffic. After the altercations, four protesters were seized by gendarmes and taken to the police station. They were questioned and fined for disturbing public peace and order. One of the protesters was transported to the Floreasca Hospital with a wound to the head. On 21 December, more than 5,000 people attended a protest in Bucharest against all political classes and new Penal Code. The protest was held under the slogan 21–22 we want the democracy back (Romanian: 21–22 vrem democrația înapoi). Mobilized on social networks, protesters demanded the resignation of Prime Minister Victor Ponta and President Traian Băsescu, but also the dissolution of Parliament. Throughout the protest, demonstrators lit candles in memory of victims of the 1989 Revolution. There were deployed hundreds of gendarmes, equipped for intervention, with batons and tear gas guns, vans and water cannons. Protesters threw stones and bottles at vehicles of the Gendarmerie and accused the gendarmes of defending thievery.

==== Reactions ====
===== Domestic =====
Amendments to the Penal Code were strongly contested by President Traian Băsescu, who said that he will return to the Parliament the law through which the president and MPs are removed from the category of civil servants. The Head of State said that the amendments to the Penal Code adopted by the Chamber are "dramatic" and "tear down ten years of work and activity of anticorruption institutions" such as National Anticorruption Directorate (DNA) or National Integrity Agency (ANI). The President mentioned in a TV show about the dissolution of Parliament, invoking the breach of the Copenhagen criteria through these amendments to the Penal Code.

The National Anticorruption Directorate showed that, following the changes to the Penal Code, lawmakers indicted for corruption or similar to that misdemeanor might be acquitted, and those detained through final sentence might be set free. President of the National Integrity Agency, Horia Georgescu, also said that, following the changes, "will be created a super-immunity", and "the history of ANI cases will be thrown up for 25 MPs".

The Superior Council of Magistracy has criticized changes to the Penal Code, emphasizing that it hadn't receive them for approval, as required by law. Legal Committee of the Chamber of Deputies said in a statement that it had no obligation to seek the opinion of SCM.

The Democratic Liberal Party submitted, on 12 December, to the Constitutional Court, two notices about the changes adopted Tuesday by the Chamber of Deputies to the Penal Code, one aimed at defining civil servant and the other one referring to the conflict of interest. Likewise, the High Court of Cassation and Justice notified the Constitutional Court on the same subject. The concerns expressed by about 50 PDL lawmakers were confirmed by the Constitutional Court of Romania. So, on 15 January 2014, the members of the Constitutional Court unanimously decided that the amendments to the Penal Code are unconstitutional. CCR judges decided that the article which removes the officials from the category of public servants breaches several articles of the Constitution concerning the rule of law, the equal rights of citizens and the Romanian State's obligation to fulfill in good faith its obligations in international treaties.

In a press conference, PSD deputy Eugen Nicolicea rejected accusations on new Penal Code, saying that press masked the truth.

===== International =====
- In a meeting of the Chamber of Deputies, U.S. Embassy sent a very harsh reaction to the changes of the Penal Code. "This action of Parliament represents a departure from the principles of transparency and the rule of law and is a discouraging signal to investors, that will adversely affect the economy of Romania". The U.S. Ambassador to the Organization for Security and Co-operation in Europe, Daniel B. Baer, said, on 20 December, that the United States are concerned about the recent amendments to the Penal Code and warned that ratification of these amendments will result in weakening the rule of law in Romania.
- (European Union) Similar reactions also came from the European Commission. The European Commission warns that public officials, regardless of the institution they work for, must obey rules against conflict of interest and corruption. "This change was not raised at any time. From our point of view, it's a decision that we didn't expect", said Mark Stephen Gray, spokesman for the European Commission.
- (United Kingdom) British Ambassador to Bucharest, Martin Harris, says he is "worried" for changes to the Penal Code. "It is very discouraging that these changes were adopted without any consultation, any debate and any opportunity for the representatives of the judiciary authority and members of civil society to comment about the proposed amendments", shows the reaction of the embassy.
- (Germany) The German Embassy took a stand against the amendments to the Penal Code, announcing that seeks "with attention and concern the current legislative measures".
- The Netherlands Embassy in Bucharest stated that seeks with concern the amendments to the Penal Code and expects the future developments.
- (Austria) Hannes Swoboda, the leader of the Socialists in the European Parliament, stated for Radio France Internationale that the amendments to the Penal Code contravene the values of the EU and is a real step backwards for the country.
- In a press release, Transparency International demands the immediate repeal of legal changes granting immunity to Romanian politicians. According to the organization, "these developments risk opening the door for corrupt politicians to act with impunity".

=== 2014–2015 political tensions ===
> 20,000 participants 10,000–20,000 participants 5,000–10,000 participants 1,000–5,000 participants < 1,000 participants
City	Peak attendees	Date	Ref.
Bucharest	70,000	20 September 2014	
Iași	30,000	22 July 2012	
Cluj-Napoca	25,000	22 March 2014	
Craiova	25,000	4 October 2014	
Sfântu Gheorghe	25,000	1 September 2012	
Timișoara	20,000	24 October 2014	
Sibiu	12,000	31 October 2014	
Mioveni	11,000	5 March 2014	
Bârlad	10,000	27 May 2013	
Constanța	10,000	11 October 2014	
Oradea	8,000	24 July 2012	
Pitești	7,000	25 July 2012	
Târgu Jiu	6,000	5 February 2015	
Brașov	5,000	17 July 2012	
Rovinari	5,000	7 May 2014	
Câmpeni	4,000	19 October 2013	
Târgu Mureș	3,500	10 March 2014	
Petroșani	3,000	8 March 2012	
Galați	2,500	1 May 2012	
Alexandria	1,500	25 July 2012	
Curtici	1,500	1 February 2014	
Râmnicu Vâlcea	1,500	28 March 2013	
Drobeta-Turnu Severin	1,200	14 July 2015	

In mid-February 2014, the Romanian government entered into deadlock after PNL, constituent party of the government, announced the reshuffling of four ministers. Victor Ponta repeatedly refused Klaus Iohannis' proposal as Deputy Premier and Minister of Interior, fact that inflamed the spirits inside PNL. Thus, on 25 February, PNL decided in an overwhelming majority to leave the ruling coalition. A day later, all PNL ministers resigned.

A major political conflict also erupted in August, when the Parliament adopted an emergency ordinance allowing local authorities to switch between political parties without sanctions. The event, marked in Romanian press as "Black Thursday" – in analogy with "Black Tuesday", was criticized by embassies of United States and United Kingdom, but especially by opposition that accuses Victor Ponta of trying to defraud presidential election in November, reason for that the Liberal Christian Alliance, supported by the People's Movement Party, threatens the government with a motion of censure. According to those who initiated this law, the party switching is a solution to institutional stalemate after breakage of the USL in February. However, the GEO was declared by CCR unconstitutional.

==== "War of the palaces" ====
Known in Romanian press as "War of the palaces" (Romanian: Războiul dintre palate) was a prolonged conflict between President Traian Băsescu and Prime Minister Victor Ponta, the representatives of Cotroceni Palace and Victoria Palace, respectively. In April 2014, conflict between the two has deepened and escalated to threats of imprisonment from both of them. President Traian Băsescu said that if Victor Ponta will try to interfere in the justice risks ending up in the hands of prosecutors, who will not tolerate that. He also stated that Ponta is deeply corrupt, and his election as president would be a great drama for Romania. In reply, Victor Ponta stated: "(...) I am absolutely convinced that Traian Băsescu will go to jail. I, who know that I have always respected the law, I have no fear".

In a TV show, President Traian Băsescu reacted to declarations of PSD senator, Gabriela Firea, stating: "She better stays in her seat and would handle what happens on the estate of her husband. Because she could no longer find him at home, if she is not careful. I understand that in his parish enough bad things happen". Victor Ponta quickly reacted to these statements by drawing up a penal complaint against President Traian Băsescu. In this complaint, the President is accused of blackmail and threat. European Socialist leader Sergey Stanishev condemned the statements made by Traian Băsescu, claiming that declarations to Gabriela Firea are provocative and inflammatory, and the suggestion that her husband could "disappear" is beyond the limits of decency.

After the scandal of Mehedinți County Council chairman, Adrian Duicu, where prosecutors say Duicu made influence peddling from Victor Ponta's office at Victoria Palace, in the presence of Interior Minister Radu Stroe, the Premier decided to move his office to the Ministry of National Defence, with "military security". Victor Ponta vehemently denied his involvement in this case, claiming that this scandal is only a frame-up. Journalists criticized the stultification of the scandal involving Prime Minister Victor Ponta, accusing him that he tries to move the discussion from concrete facts reported by DNA prosecutors in the plan of political conflict with Traian Băsescu and "press staging". Victor Ponta's movement from the Victoria Palace to the Ministry of Defence was also criticized by PNL President Crin Antonescu, claiming that the Prime Minister "has lost control" and "mocks the country's institutions".

==== Presidential election protests ====
An apparent discrepancy between the number of polling stations and the estimated voters in most European countries (in Germany only five stations were open for more than 200,000 expats), voters saw this as an ideologically selective denial of exercising the right to vote. This fact attracted Romanians' angry at Ponta's policies, who began a "campaign" of protests and civil demonstrations within the country and abroad. Protests first broke out on 8 November when thousands gathered in city squares in support of compatriots living abroad who were turned away as they tried to vote in the first round, prompting Romania's foreign minister Titus Corlățean to resign. Long queues and bureaucratic hurdles made the voting process lengthy at Romanian embassies across the European Union and elsewhere in the first round. Many were unable to cast their ballots before voting ended. The government has taken measures to ensure 16 November vote runs smoothly, increasing the number of voting booths and staff abroad. But it has not increased the number of polling stations, as Romanian diaspora groups had demanded.

A video depicting potential voters waiting and protesting in Munich, approximately one hour before the polls closed on 16 November

A day before the presidential runoff, large demonstrations were held across the country, with 15,000 attendees in Cluj-Napoca and 5,000 in Timișoara. The protests targeted PSD candidate and PM Victor Ponta, blamed for poor organization of the voting process in diaspora. The irregularities in the first round repeated in the runoff. Then, tens of thousands of Romanians abroad were attacked with batons and tear gas by law enforcers, while voters forced the entrance into embassies to cast their vote. In Bucharest, up to 20,000 people gathered to protest against Victor Ponta, destroying the electoral posters with him. To everyone's surprise, ethnic German candidate Klaus Iohannis from PNL won the election with a comfortable margin, despite the fact that Victor Ponta surpassed Iohannis in all polls. Iohannis celebrated the victory with demonstrators in University Square. The result of the vote was seen in media as a "small revolution", given that Victor Ponta controlled the government since 2012, and PSD is the largest party in the country.

==== Protests against MP immunity ====
In March 2015, a dispute arose between ruling alliance PSD–UNPR–PC and main opposition party, PNL. PSD majority in the Senate rejected the solicitation of DNA prosecutors of arresting PSD MP Dan Șova in a corruption case. Although the vote was detrimental to Șova (79 to 67), PSD senators made use of a provision in the Rules of the Senate, ignoring the Constitution. The Rules of the Senate say that a decision is taken by majority of all members, not by the majority of members present. Thus, by this interpretation, DNA needed 85 votes in favor. The interpretation of the law by PSD senators defies the Constitution, namely Article 76, which states that "Ordinary laws and resolutions shall be passed by a majority vote of members present in each Chamber".

In this context, the National Liberal Party intends to appeal to the Constitutional Court the decision of the Senate, also demanding early elections. The Constitutional Court was also appealed by President Klaus Iohannis and the National Anticorruption Directorate. George Kent, main coordinator of anticorruption programs in the Bureau for Europe and Eurasia of the U.S. State Department, criticized the decision, pointing that "justice must be able to judge". Moreover, British Embassy in Bucharest expressed its concern about vote in the case of Dan Șova, stressing that "no one is above the law". The same position was taken by Klaus Iohannis, also stating that "quality of deputy, senator or minister should not give anyone immunity to justice". Netherlands Embassy stated that follows "with concern and surprise" developments concerning parliamentary immunity, especially in a context where political parties have pledged to fight corruption. Cultural figures of Romania, among them writer Mircea Cărtărescu, demanded early elections and expressed their dissatisfaction with the vote.

Following a complaint lodged by PNL, judges of the Constitutional Court ascertained, on 6 May, that the Senate decision in Șova case is unconstitutional, because it was adopted pursuant to legal and regulation dispositions which contravened the provisions of Article 76 paragraph 2 of the Constitution.

=== November 2015 protests ===
In 2015, following the Colectiv nightclub fire, a series of protests were held across Romania. These resulted in the resignation of the Prime Minister at that time, Victor Ponta. Afterwards, on 10 November 2015, President Klaus Iohannis nominated Dacian Cioloș to be prime minister. On 17 November 2015 the Parliament voted in favour of the nomination, which marked the beginning of the Cioloș Cabinet.

== See also ==
- Corruption in Romania
- List of protests in the 21st century
