= First Ponta cabinet =

Ponta I
- 121st Cabinet of Romania

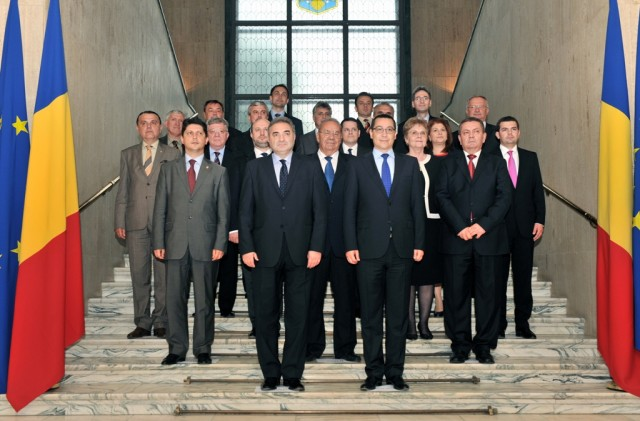
- Date formed: 7 May 2012
- Date dissolved: 21 December 2012

People and organisations
- Head of state: Traian Băsescu
- Head of government: Victor Ponta
- No. of ministers: 20
- Ministers removed: 7
- Total no. of members: 20
- Member party: USL (PSD, PNL, PC),
- Status in legislature: Coalition (Majority)
- Opposition party: PD-L, UDMR
- Opposition leader: Vasile Blaga, Hunor Kelemen

History
- Election: -
- Outgoing election: 9 December 2012
- Legislature term: 2008 - 2012
- Budget: none
- Predecessor: Ungureanu
- Successor: Ponta II

After a second vote of no confidence passed in the Parliament of Romania on 27 April 2012, this time aimed against the Ungureanu Cabinet, Victor Ponta was asked by President Traian Băsescu to form a new Government. His cabinet, unveiled on 1 May, received the parliamentary vote of confidence on 7 May 2012 and governed Romania until the 2012 Romanian legislative election.

== Structure ==
Cabinet office	Name	Party	In office since	Cabinet left office
Prime Minister	Victor Ponta	PSD	7 May 2012	21 December 2012
Deputy Prime-Minister, Minister of Public Finance	Florin Georgescu	Ind.	7 May 2012	21 December 2012
Ministry of Foreign Affairs	Titus Corlățean	PSD	6 August 2012	21 December 2012
Minister of Agriculture and Rural Development	Daniel Constantin	PC	7 May 2012	21 December 2012
Minister of Economy, Commerce and Business Environment	Daniel Chițoiu	PNL	7 May 2012	21 December 2012
Minister of Administration and Interior	Mircea Dușa	PSD	6 August 2012	21 December 2012
Minister of National Defense	Corneliu Dobrițoiu	PNL	7 May 2012	21 December 2012
Minister of Justice	Mona Pivniceru	Ind.	23 August 2012	21 December 2012
Minister of Labor, Family and Social Protection	Mariana Câmpeanu	PNL	7 May 2012	21 December 2012
Minister of Education, Research, Innovation, Youth and Sport	Ecaterina Andronescu	PSD	2 July 2012	21 December 2012
Minister of Transport and Infrastructure	Ovidiu Silaghi	PNL	7 May 2012	21 December 2012
Minister of Health	Raed Arafat	Ind.	7 November 2012	21 December 2012
Minister of Regional Development and Tourism	Eduard Hellvig	PNL	7 May 2012	21 December 2012
Minister of Environment and Forests	Rovana Plumb	PSD	7 May 2012	21 December 2012
Minister of Culture and National Patrimony	Puiu Hașotti	PNL	25 June 2012	21 December 2012
Minister of Communications and Information Society	Dan Nica	PSD	7 May 2012	21 December 2012
Minister of European Affairs	Leonard Orban	Ind.	20 September 2011	21 December 2012
Minister Delegate for the Business Environment	Mihai Voicu	PNL	6 August 2012	21 December 2012
Minister Delegate for Administration	Radu Stroe	PNL	6 August 2012	21 December 2012
Minister Delegate for Social Dialog	Liviu Pop	Ind.	7 May 2012	21 December 2012
Minister Delegate for Liaison with Parliament	Dan Șova	PSD	6 August 2012	21 December 2012
Former cabinet members and cabinet offices held
Cabinet office	Name	Party	In office since	In office until
Ministry of Foreign Affairs	Andrei Marga	PNL	7 May 2012	6 August 2012
Minister of Administration and Interior	Ioan Rus	PSD	7 May 2012	6 August 2012
Minister of Justice	Titus Corlățean	PSD	7 May 2012	6 August 2012
Minister of Justice	Victor Ponta interim	PSD	6 August 2012	23 August 2012
Minister of Education, Research, Innovation, Youth and Sport	Ioan Mang	PSD	7 May 2012	15 May 2012
Minister of Education, Research, Innovation, Youth and Sport	Liviu Pop (interim)	Ind.	15 May 2012	2 July 2012
Minister of Health	Vasile Cepoi	Ind.	7 May 2012	2 October 2012
Minister of Health	Victor Ponta (interim)	PSD	3 October 2012	7 November 2012
Minister of Culture and National Patrimony	Mircea Diaconu	PNL	7 May 2012	19 June 2012
Minister Delegate for the Business Environment	Lucian Isar	Ind.	7 May 2012	6 August 2012
Minister Delegate for Administration	Victor Paul Dobre	PNL	7 May 2012	6 August 2012
Minister Delegate for Liaison with Parliament	Mircea Dușa	PSD	7 May 2012	6 August 2012
