= Second Ponta cabinet =

Romanian Council of Ministers

Ponta II
- 122nd Cabinet of Romania
- Date formed: 21 December 2012
- Date dissolved: 5 March 2014

People and organisations
- Head of state: Traian Băsescu
- Head of government: Victor Ponta
- No. of ministers: 28
- Member parties: PSD, PNL, PC, UNPR
- Status in legislature: Coalition (Majority)
- Opposition parties: PDL, UDMR, FC, PNȚCD, PP-DD, PMP
- Opposition leaders: Vasile Blaga, Hunor Kelemen, Mihai Răzvan Ungureanu, Aurelian Pavelescu, Dan Diaconescu, Eugen Tomac

History
- Election: 9 December 2012
- Legislature term: 2012–2016
- Budget: 116.3 billion lei
- Predecessor: Ponta I
- Successor: Ponta III

Ponta II Cabinet was the Council of Ministers which governed Romania from 21 December 2012 to 5 March 2014. A crisis inside the ruling coalition, the Social Liberal Union (USL), resulted in the split of the governing alliance and collapse of the government.

== History ==
On 17 December 2012, after USL victory in the legislative elections of 9 December, President Traian Băsescu nominated Victor Ponta to form a new government, this being the only person proposed by the parliamentary parties. Ponta II Cabinet received the vote of confidence of the Parliament on 21 December, with 402 votes "for" and 120 "against".

Ponta II Cabinet was composed of three deputy prime ministers, 15 ministers and nine minister-delegates. The three deputy prime ministers were: Liviu Dragnea (PSD) – Minister of Administration and Regional Development, Daniel Chițoiu (PNL) – Minister of Finance and Gabriel Oprea (UNPR) – deputy prime minister without portfolio in the field of defense and national security.

Ponta II Cabinet was composed of 60 state secretaries (13 more than in Ponta I Cabinet) and 120 heads of agencies.

=== Controversies ===
Minister Relu Fenechiu left on 12 July 2013 the Ministry of Transport, after he was handed a five-year prison sentence for corruption. The interim was taken by Prime Minister Victor Ponta. But, at its expiration, PNL was somehow obliged to submit a proposal to the Prime Minister for the position of Minister of Transport. There was conveyed the name of Nini Săpunaru, but after Ponta publicly opposed the proposal, PNL has submitted another name candidate to the ministry's seat – Ramona Mănescu. The Prime Minister accepted the proposal, and so, Ramona Mănescu took the oath on 26 August.

Another minister that submitted the resignation is Varujan Vosganian, responsible for Economy. This comes after the Directorate for Investigating Organized Crime and Terrorism asked the criminal prosecution against Vosganian, for gaff and undermining the national economy. Sources inside USL said that Vosganian resigned upon the request of Prime Minister Victor Ponta.

On 12 December 2013, Minister of Culture Daniel Barbu resigned after displaced statements on "too big" budget for prevention and control of HIV/AIDS. His declarations sparked public outrage, being sanctioned by the National Council for Combating Discrimination. A few days before, President of the Senate Crin Antonescu said that Barbu should resign.

==== 2014 governmental crisis ====
A major crisis is shaking the current government of Romania. It was triggered a few days after PNL, constituent party of government, announced the reshuffling of four ministers. Tensions between leaders of the two major parties of government, Victor Ponta (PSD) and Crin Antonescu (PNL), grew until 25 February, when PNL decided in an overwhelming majority to leave the ruling coalition. A day later, all PNL ministers resigned. This situation puts the current Prime Minister Victor Ponta in difficulty, inasmuch as he is forced to form a new government.

== Structure ==
Ministry	Name	Party	In office since	Until
Prime Minister	Victor Ponta	PSD	21 December 2012	5 March 2014
Deputy Prime Minister, Minister of Regional Development and Public Administration	Liviu Dragnea	PSD	21 December 2012	5 March 2014
Deputy Prime Minister, Minister of Public Finance	Daniel Chițoiu	PNL	21 December 2012	19 February 2014
Deputy Prime Minister, Minister of Public Finance	Victor Ponta	PSD	19 February 2014 (acting)	5 March 2014
Deputy Prime Minister	Gabriel Oprea	UNPR	21 December 2012	5 March 2014
Minister of Agriculture and Rural Development	Daniel Constantin	PC	7 May 2012	5 March 2014
Minister of Foreign Affairs	Titus Corlățean	PSD	6 August 2012	5 March 2014
Minister of Internal Affairs	Radu Stroe	PNL	21 December 2012	23 January 2014
Minister of Internal Affairs	Gabriel Oprea	UNPR	23 January 2014 (acting)	5 March 2014
Minister of National Defence	Mircea Dușa	PSD	21 December 2012	5 March 2014
Minister of Justice	Mona Pivniceru	Ind.	23 August 2012	28 March 2013
Minister of Justice	Victor Ponta	PSD	28 March 2013 (acting)	15 April 2013
Minister of Justice	Robert Cazanciuc	Ind.	15 April 2013	5 March 2014
Minister for Environment and Climate Change	Rovana Plumb	PSD	7 May 2012	5 March 2014
Minister of Economy	Varujan Vosganian	PNL	21 December 2012	7 October 2013
Minister of Economy	Daniel Chițoiu	PNL	7 October 2013 (acting)	17 October 2013
Minister of Economy	Andrei Gerea	PNL	17 October 2013	19 February 2014
Minister of Economy	Constantin Niță	PSD	19 February 2014 (acting)	5 March 2014
Minister for Information Society	Dan Nica	PSD	7 May 2012	5 March 2014
Minister of Health	Eugen Nicolăescu	PNL	21 December 2012	5 March 2014
Minister of National Education	Remus Pricopie	PSD	21 December 2012	5 March 2014
Minister of Labour, Family, Social Protection and Elders	Mariana Câmpeanu	PNL	7 May 2012	5 March 2014
Minister of European Funds	Eugen Teodorovici	PSD	21 December 2012	5 March 2014
Minister of Transport	Relu Fenechiu	PNL	21 December 2012	12 July 2013
Minister of Transport	Victor Ponta	PSD	12 July 2013 (acting)	26 August 2013
Minister of Transport	Ramona Mănescu	PNL	26 August 2013	5 March 2014
Minister of Culture	Daniel Barbu	PNL	21 December 2012	12 December 2013
Minister of Culture	Gigel Știrbu	PNL	12 December 2013	5 March 2014
Minister of Youth and Sports	Nicolae Bănicioiu	PSD	21 December 2012	5 March 2014
Minister Delegate for Budget	Liviu Voinea	PSD	21 December 2012	5 March 2014
Minister Delegate for Water, Forests and Fisheries	Lucia Varga	PNL	21 December 2012	5 March 2014
Minister Delegate for Infrastructure Projects of National Interest and Foreign Investment	Dan Șova	PSD	21 December 2012	5 March 2014
Minister Delegate for Small and Medium Enterprises, Business Environment and Tourism	Maria Grapini	PC	21 December 2012	5 March 2014
Minister Delegate for Energy	Constantin Niță	PSD	21 December 2012	5 March 2014
Minister Delegate for Higher Education, Scientific Research and Technological Development	Mihnea Costoiu	PSD	21 December 2012	5 March 2014
Minister Delegate for Relations with Parliament	Mihai Voicu	PNL	21 December 2012	5 March 2014
Minister Delegate for Romanians Abroad	Cristian David	PNL	21 December 2012	5 March 2014
Minister Delegate for Social Dialogue	Doina Pană	PSD	21 December 2012	5 March 2014
