= Ministry of Internal Affairs (Romania) =

Government ministry of Romania

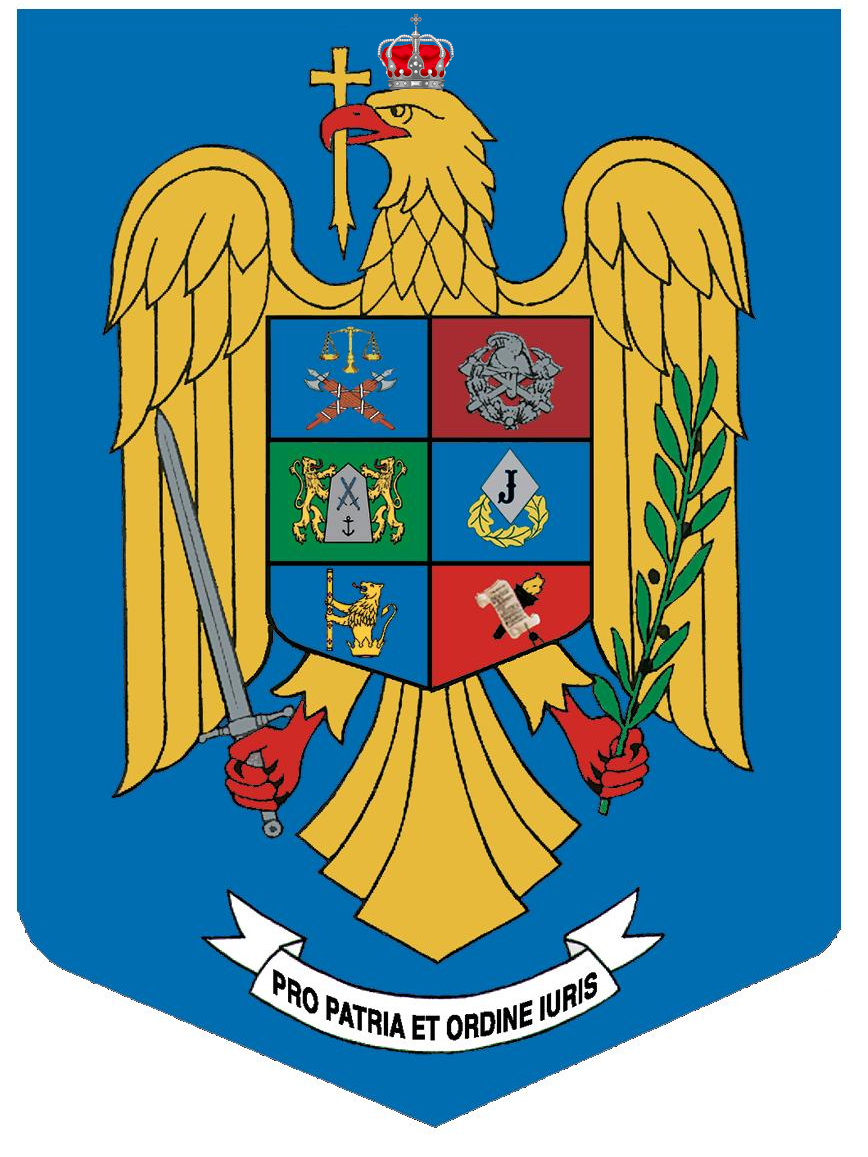
- Coat of arms of the Ministry of Internal Affairs

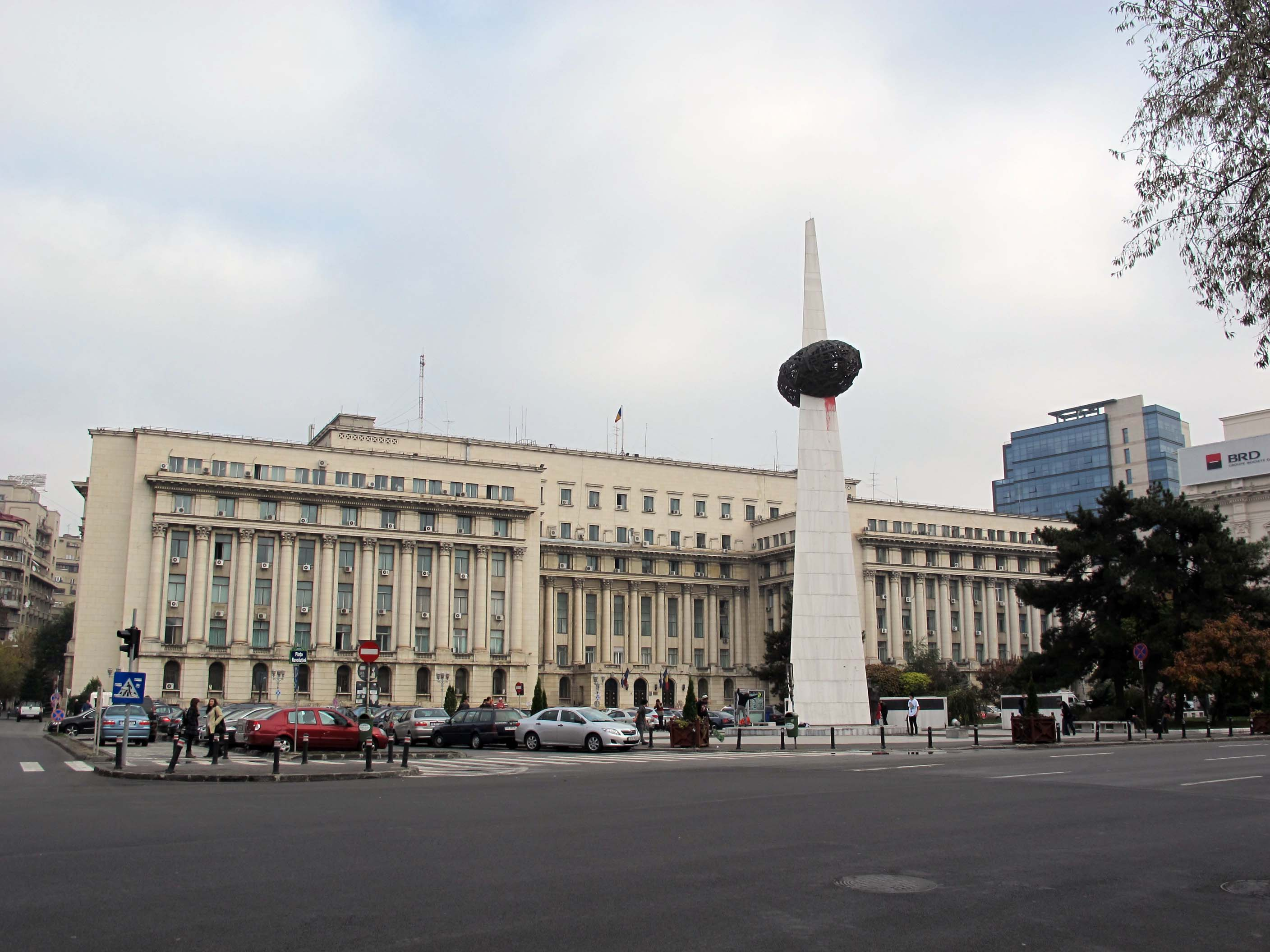
- Ministry headquarters in Revolution Square, Bucharest

Agency overview
- Formed: 22 January 1862
- Jurisdiction: Government of Romania
- Headquarters: Revolution Square, Bucharest
- Minister responsible: Marian Neacșu
- Child agency: Romanian Police Gendarmerie General Directorate for Passports
- Website: www.mai.gov.ro

The Ministry of Internal Affairs of Romania (Romanian: Ministerul Afacerilor Interne) is one of the eighteen ministries of the Government of Romania.

From 23 August 1944 to 18 March 1975 the ministry held the title of Minister of Internal Affairs, between 2004 and 2007, held the title of Minister of Administration and Interior, and since April 2007, Minister of Interior and Administrative Reform. In December 2008, the Boc government changed the name back to Ministry of Administration and Interior.

Until 2006, the ministry was housed near Lipscani in Palatul Vama Poştei, built between 1914 and 1926 according to the architect Statie Ciortan's plans. In 2006 the ministry moved into the former building of the Senate on Revolution Square.

== Subordinated structures ==
Within Romania, the following structures are subordinated to the Ministry of Internal Affairs:

- Romanian Police
- Romanian Gendarmerie
- Romanian Border Police
- General Inspectorate for Emergency Situations
- General Inspectorate for Immigration
- General Inspectorate of Aviation
- Romanian National Archives
- General Directorate for Internal Protection
- Anti-Corruption General Directorate
- National Administration of State Reserves and Special Issues
- General Directorate of Passports
- Directorate for Persons Record and Databases' Management
- Directorate for Driving Licenses and Vehicles Registration Certificates
- National Anti-Drug Agency
- National Agency against Trafficking in Human Beings
- National Archives
- Alexandru Ioan Cuza Police Academy
- Institute for Public Order Studies
- National SIS Centre
- Centre for the MAI Retired Personnel
- Psychosociology Centre of MAI
- Dinamo Sports Club, Bucharest

== History ==
=== List of ministers ===
This is a list of interior ministers from the creation of the Romanian state (1862) to the present day.

| No. | Name | Term start | Term end | Cabinet | Party |
|---|---|---|---|---|---|
Principality of Romania
| 1 | Barbu Catargiu | 15 February 1862 | 8 June 1862 | | |
| 2 | Apostol Arsache | 8 June 1862 | 24 June 1862 | | |
| 3 | Nicolae Kretzulescu | 24 June 1862 | 11 October 1863 | | |
| 4 | Mihail Kogălniceanu | 11 October 1863 | 26 January 1865 | | |
| 5 | Constantin Bosianu | 26 January 1865 | 14 June 1865 | | |
| 6 | General Ioan E. Florescu | 14 June 1865 | 30 January 1866 | | |
| 7 | Nicolae Kretzulescu | 30 January 1866 | 11 February 1866 | | |
| 8 | Prince Dimitrie Ghica | 11 February 1866 | 10 May 1866 | | |
| 9 | Lascăr Catargiu | 11 May 1866 | 13 July 1866 | | |
| 10 | Ion Ghica | 15 July 1866 | 21 February 1867 | | |
| 11 | Ion C. Brătianu | 1 March 1867 | 5 August 1867 | | |
| 12 | Ștefan Golescu | 17 August 1867 | 13 November 1867 | | |
| 13 | Ion C. Brătianu | 13 November 1867 | 29 April 1868 | | |
| 14 | Ion C. Brătianu | 1 May 1868 | 12 August 1868 | | |
| 15 | Anton I. Arion | 12 August 1868 | 16 November 1868 | | |
| 16 | Mihail Kogălniceanu | 16 November 1868 | 24 January 1870 | | |
| 17 | Prince Dimitrie Ghica | 24 January 1870 | 27 January 1870 | | |
| 18 | Alexandru G. Golescu | 2 February 1870 | 30 March 1870 | | |
| 19 | Emanoil Costache Epureanu | 20 April 1870 | 14 December 1870 | | |
| 20 | Ion Ghica | 18 December 1870 | 11 March 1871 | | |
| 21 | Lascăr Catargiu | 11 March 1871 | 31 March 1876 | | |
| 22 | George Vernescu | 27 April 1876 | 27 January 1877 | | |
| 23 | Ion C. Brătianu | 27 January 1877 | 26 May 1878 | | |
| 24 | Constantin A. Rosetti | 26 May 1878 | 17 November 1878 | | |
| 25 | Mihail Kogălniceanu | 17 November 1878 | 25 November 1878 | | |
| 26 | Ion C. Brătianu | 25 November 1878 | 5 July 1879 | | |
| 27 | Mihail Kogălniceanu | 11 July 1879 | 17 April 1880 | | |
| 28 | Ion C. Brătianu | 17 April 1880 | 15 July 1880 | | |
| 29 | Anastase Stolojan | 15 July 1880 | 20 July 1880 | | |
| 30 | Alexandru Teriachiu | 20 July 1880 | 1 March 1881 | | |
| 31 | Alexandru Teriachiu | 1 March 1881 | 5 April 1881 | | |
| 32 | Eugeniu Stătescu | 10 April 1881 | 8 June 1881 | | |
| 33 | Constantin A. Rosetti | 9 June 1881 | 25 January 1882 | | |
| 34 | Ion C. Brătianu | 25 January 1882 | 1 August 1882 | | |
| 35 | Gheorghe Chițu | 1 August 1882 | 23 June 1884 | | |
| 36 | Ion C. Brătianu | 23 June 1884 | 29 April 1887 | | |
| 37 | General Radu Mihai | 29 April 1887 | 1 March 1888 | | |
| 38 | Constantin Nacu | 1 March 1888 | 20 March 1888 | | |
| 39 | Theodor C. Rosetti | 23 March 1888 | 12 November 1888 | | |
| 40 | Prince Alexandru B. Știrbei | 12 November 1888 | 26 March 1889 | | |
| 41 | Lascăr Catargiu | 29 March 1889 | 3 November 1889 | | |
| 42 | General Gheorghe Manu | 5 November 1889 | 15 February 1891 | | |
| 43 | Lascăr Catargiu | 21 February 1891 | 3 October 1895 | | |
| 44 | Nicolae Fleva | 4 October 1895 | 15 January 1896 | | |
| 45 | Dimitrie Sturdza | 15 January 1896 | 3 February 1896 | | |
| 46 | Anastase Stolojan | 3 February 1896 | 21 November 1896 | | |
| 47 | Vasile Lascăr | 21 November 1896 | 26 March 1897 | | |
| 48 | Mihail Pherekyde | 31 March 1897 | 30 March 1899 | | |
| 49 | Gheorghe Grigore Cantacuzino | 11 April 1899 | 9 January 1900 | | |
| 50 | General Gheorghe Manu | 9 January 1900 | 7 July 1900 | | |
| 51 | Constantin Olănescu | 7 July 1900 | 13 February 1901 | | |
| 52 | Petre S. Aurelian | 14 February 1901 | 18 July 1902 | | |
| 53 | Gheorghe Pallade | 18 July 1902 | 22 November 1902 | | |
| 54 | Vasile Lascăr | 22 November 1902 | 13 December 1904 | | |
| 55 | Spiru Haret | 13 December 1904 | 20 December 1904 | | |
| 56 | Gheorghe Grigore Cantacuzino | 22 December 1904 | 12 March 1907 | | |
| 57 | Ion I. C. Brătianu | 12 March 1907 | 27 December 1908 | | |
| 58 | Mihail Pherekyde | 27 December 1908 | 6 February 1910 | | |
| | Ion I. C. Brătianu | 6 February 1910 | 28 December 1910 | | |
| 59 | Alexandru Marghiloman | 29 December 1910 | 28 March 1912 | | |
| 60 | Constantin C. Arion | 28 March 1912 | 14 October 1912 | | |
| 61 | Take Ionescu | 14 October 1912 | 31 December 1913 | | |
| 62 | Vasile G. Morțun | 4 January 1914 | 11 December 1916 | | |
| 63 | Alexandru C. Constantinescu | 11 December 1916 | 26 January 1918 | | |
| 64 | Constantin Sărățeanu | 29 January 1918 | 27 February 1918 | | |
| 65 | Alexandru Marghiloman | 5 March 1918 | 24 October 1918 | | |
| 66 | Gen. Artur Văitoianu | 24 October 1918 | 29 November 1918 | | |
| 67 | Gheorghe Gh. Mârzescu | 29 November 1918 | 12 September 1919 | | |
| 68 | Gen. Arthur Văitoianu | 27 September 1919 | 28 November 1919 | | |
| 69 | Gen. Alexandru Averescu | 1 December 1919 | 13 December 1919 | | |
| 70 | Aurel Vlad | 16 December 1919 | 27 December 1919 | | |
| 71 | Nicolae L. Lupu | 27 December 1919 | 13 March 1920 | | |
| 72 | Gen. Alexandru Averescu | 13 March 1920 | 13 June 1920 | | |
| 73 | Constantin Argetoianu | 13 June 1920 | 13 December 1921 | | |
| 74 | Ion Cămărășescu | 17 December 1921 | 17 January 1922 | | |
| 75 | Gen. Artur Văitoianu | 19 January 1922 | 30 October 1923 | | |
| 76 | Ion I. C. Brătianu | 30 October 1923 | 27 March 1926 | | |
| 77 | Octavian Goga | 30 March 1926 | 4 June 1927 | | |
| 78 | Prince Barbu Știrbey | 4 June 1927 | 20 June 1927 | | |
| 79 | Ion G. Duca | 21 June 1927 | 3 November 1928 | | |
| 80 | Alexandru Vaida-Voievod | 10 November 1928 | 7 June 1930 | | |
| 81 | Mihai Popovici | 7 June 1930 | 8 June 1930 | | |
| 82 | Alexandru Vaida-Voievod | 13 June 1930 | 8 October 1930 | | |
| 83 | Ion Mihalache | 10 October 1930 | 4 April 1931 | | |
| 84 | Nicolae Iorga | 18 April 1931 | 7 May 1931 | | |
| | Constantin Argetoianu | 7 May 1931 | 31 May 1932 | | |
| 85 | Alexandru Vaida-Voievod | 6 June 1932 | 10 August 1932 | | |
| 86 | Ion Mihalache | 11 August 1932 | 17 October 1932 | | |
| 87 | Ion Mihalache | 20 October 1932 | 8 January 1933 | | |
| 88 | George G. Mironescu | 14 January 1933 | 9 November 1933 | | |
| 89 | Ion Inculeț | 14 November 1933 | 3 January 1934 | | |
| 90 | Ion Inculeț | 5 January 1934 | 29 August 1936 | | |
| 91 | Dumitru Iuca | 29 August 1936 | 23 February 1937 | | |
| 92 | Gheorghe Tătărescu | 23 February 1937 | 14 November 1937 | | |
| 93 | Richard Franasovici | 17 November 1937 | 28 December 1937 | | |
| 94 | Armand Călinescu | 28 December 1937 | 21 September 1939 | | |
| 95 | Gen. Gabriel Marinescu | 21 September 1939 | 28 September 1939 | | |
| 96 | Nicolae Ottescu | 28 September 1939 | 23 November 1939 | | |
| 97 | Gheorghe Tătărescu | 24 November 1939 | 30 November 1939 | | |
| 98 | Mihail Ghelmegeanu | 30 November 1939 | 4 July 1940 | | |
| 99 | Gen. David Popescu | 4 July 1940 | 14 September 1940 | | |
| 100 | Gen. Constantin Petrovicescu | 14 September 1940 | 20 January 1941 | | |
| 101 | Gen. Dumitru I. Popescu | 21 January 1941 | 23 August 1944 | | |
| 102 | Gen. Aurel Aldea | 23 August 1944 | 4 November 1944 | | |
| 103 | Nicolae Penescu | 4 November 1944 | 6 December 1944 | | |
| 104 | Constantin Sănătescu | 6 December 1944 | 14 December 1944 | | |
| 105 | Gen. Nicolae Rădescu | 14 December 1944 | 28 February 1945 | | |
| 106 | Teohari Georgescu | 6 March 1945 | 30 December 1947 | | |
| 107 | Teohari Georgescu | 30 December 1947 | 28 May 1952 | | |
| 108 | Alexandru Drăghici | 28 May 1952 | 20 September 1952 | | |
| 109 | Pavel Ștefan | 20 September 1952 | 19 March 1957 | | |
| 110 | Alexandru Drăghici | 19 March 1957 | 27 July 1965 | | |
| 111 | Cornel Onescu | 27 July 1965 | 24 April 1972 | | |
| 112 | Ion Stănescu | 24 April 1972 | 17 March 1973 | | |
| 113 | Emil Bobu | 17 March 1973 | 18 March 1975 | | |
| 114 | Teodor Coman | 18 March 1975 | 5 September 1978 | | |
| 115 | George Homoștean | 5 September 1978 | 5 October 1987 | | |
| 116 | Tudor Postelnicu | 5 October 1987 | 22 December 1989 | | |
| 117 | Gen. Mihai Chițac | 29 December 1989 | 16 June 1990 | | |
| 118 | Doru-Viorel Ursu | 16 June 1990 | 26 September 1991 | | |
| 119 | Victor Babiuc | 17 October 1991 | 9 November 1992 | | |
| 120 | George Ioan Dănescu | 19 November 1992 | 6 March 1994 | | |
| 121 | Doru Ioan Tărăcilă | 6 March 1994 | 11 December 1996 | Văcăroiu I | PDSR |
| 122 | Gavril Dejeu | 12 December 1996 | 21 January 1999 | | |
| 123 | Constantin Dudu Ionescu | 21 January 1999 | 28 December 2000 | | |
| 124 | Ioan Rus | 28 December 2000 | 15 June 2004 | Năstase | PDSR/PSD |
| 125 | Marian Săniuță | 15 June 2004 | 28 December 2004 | Năstase | PSD |
| 126 | Vasile Blaga^{i} | 29 December 2004 | 4 April 2007 | Tăriceanu I | PD |
| 127 | Cristian David | 5 April 2007 | 22 December 2008 | Tăriceanu II | PNL |
| 128 | Gabriel Oprea | 22 December 2008 | 13 January 2009 | Boc I | PSD |
| | Dan Nica^{i} | 13 January 2009 | 20 January 2009 | Boc I | PSD |
| 130 | Liviu Dragnea | 20 January 2009 | 2 February 2009 | Boc I | PSD |
| 131 | Dan Nica^{ii} | 2 February 2009 | 1 October 2009 | Boc I | PSD |
| (126) | Vasile Blaga^{ii} | 1 October 2009 | 27 November 2009 | Boc I | PD-L |
| (126) | Vasile Blaga^{iii} | 23 December 2009 | 27 September 2010 | Boc II | PD-L |
| 132 | Traian Igaș | 27 September 2010 | 9 February 2012 | Boc II | PD-L |
| 133 | Gabriel Berca | 9 February 2012 | 7 May 2012 | Ungureanu | PD-L |
| (124) | Ioan Rus | 7 May 2012 | 6 August 2012 | Ponta I | PSD |
| 134 | Mircea Dușa | 6 August 2012 | 21 December 2012 | Ponta I | PSD |
| 135 | Radu Stroe | 21 December 2012 | 23 January 2014 | Ponta II | PNL |
| (128) | Gabriel Oprea | 23 January 2014 | 5 March 2014 | Ponta II | UNPR |
| (128) | Gabriel Oprea | 5 March 2014 | 17 December 2014 | Ponta III | UNPR |
| (128) | Gabriel Oprea | 17 December 2014 | 17 November 2015 | Ponta IV | UNPR |
| 136 | Petre Tobă | 17 November 2015 | 1 September 2016 | Cioloș | Independent |
| 137 | Dragoș Tudorache | 1 September 2016 | 4 January 2017 | Cioloș | Independent |
| (138) | Carmen Dan | 4 January 2017 | 29 June 2017 | Grindeanu Cabinet | PSD |
| (138) | Carmen Dan | 29 June 2017 | 16 January 2018 | Tudose Cabinet | PSD |
| (138) | Carmen Dan | 29 January 2018 | 24 July 2019 | Dăncilă Cabinet | PSD |
| 139 | Nicolae Moga | 24 July 2019 | 30 July 2019 | Dăncilă Cabinet | PSD |
| 140 | Marcel Vela | 4 November 2019 | 23 December 2020 | Orban | PNL |
| 141 | Lucian Bode | 23 December 2020 | 25 November 2021 | Cîțu Cabinet | PNL |
| 141 | Lucian Bode | 25 November 2021 | 15 June 2023 | Ciucă Cabinet | PNL |
| 142 | Cătălin Predoiu^{i} | 15 June 2023 | 23 December 2024 | Ciolacu I | PNL |
| 143 | Cătălin Predoiu^{ii} | 23 December 2024 | 23 June 2025 | Ciolacu II | PNL |
| 144 | Cătălin Predoiu^{iii} | 23 June 2025 | 20 October 2026 | Bolojan Cabinet | PNL |
| 145 | Marian Neacșu | 20 October 2026 | Incumbent | Niculescu Cabinet | PSD |

Romania used the Julian calendar until 1919, but all dates are given in the Gregorian calendar.

The following party abbreviations are used:

| PNL = National Liberal Party | PC = Conservative Party |
| PNR = Romanian National Party | PP = People's Party |
| PCD = Conservative-Democratic Party | PNȚ = National Peasants' Party |
| PND = Democratic Nationalist Party | PNC = National Christian Party |
| FRN = National Renaissance Front (from 1940 PN; Party of the Nation) | FP = Ploughmen's Front |
| PMR = Romanian Workers' Party (from 1965 PCR; Romanian Communist Party) | FSN = National Salvation Front |
| PDSR = Party of Social Democracy in Romania (from 2001 PSD; Social Democratic Party) | PNȚCD = Christian-Democratic National Peasants' Party |
| PSDR = Romanian Social Democratic Party | PD = Democratic Party |
PD-L = Democratic Liberal Party
| Mil. = Military | Ind. = Independent |

Additionally, the political stance of prime ministers prior to the development of a modern party system is given by C (Conservative), MC (Moderate Conservative), RL (Radical Liberal) and ML (Moderate Liberal). Interim officeholders are denoted by italics. For those who held office multiple times, their rank of service is given by a Roman numeral.
