= Investigations involving Victor Ponta =

2015 Romanian political crisis
- Date: 5 June 2015 – 17 November 2015
- Location: Romania
- Caused by: Criminal investigation against Victor Ponta and members of his family; Prime Minister's refusal to resign
- Methods: Motion of censure; Protest
- Result: Resignation of Victor Ponta; Victor Ponta initially acquitted in 2018, appeal suspended since 2019

Parties
President of Romania Opposition parties: National Liberal Party; Democratic Union of Hungarians in Romania; People's Movement Party; M10; Romanian Social Party	Government of Romania: Social Democratic Party; National Union for the Progress of Romania; Alliance of Liberals and Democrats

Lead figures
Klaus Iohannis; Alina Gorghiu; Vasile Blaga; Hunor Kelemen; Eugen Tomac; Monica Macovei; Mircea Geoană	Victor Ponta; Gabriel Oprea; Daniel Constantin; Călin Popescu-Tăriceanu

During the first days of June 2015, the Government of Romania was rocked by criminal investigation against Prime Minister Victor Ponta for 19 acts of corruption between 2007 and 2008, when he was lawyer. Moreover, Victor Ponta is also investigated for conflict of interest during his premiership, when he propelled Dan Șova, political ally and friend, in government positions. His resignation was demanded by President Klaus Iohannis and several figures in opposition. Victor Ponta denied the allegations and refused to resign, plunging the country into the second political crisis in just three years.

There is an ongoing political stand-off between governing and opposition parties, which are also the two largest parties: the PSD and PNL. The latter filed on 5 June a motion of censure against Ponta IV Cabinet for failing to organize the presidential election in diaspora in November 2014.

== Criminal investigation against Victor Ponta ==
Former prime minister Victor Ponta, former deputy Dan Șova, and Laurențiu Ciurel, former general manager of Complex Energetic Rovinari, were acquitted.

According to a press release from the National Anticorruption Directorate (DNA), Victor Ponta was accused of forgery under private signature (17 offenses) and complicity in tax evasion through repeated and money laundering. Likewise, DNA asked notice for beginning criminal prosecution of prime minister for conflict of interest, in the case of Dan Șova's promotion in the Government. Thus, Victor Ponta becomes the first sitting prime minister of Romania to be prosecuted for corruption.

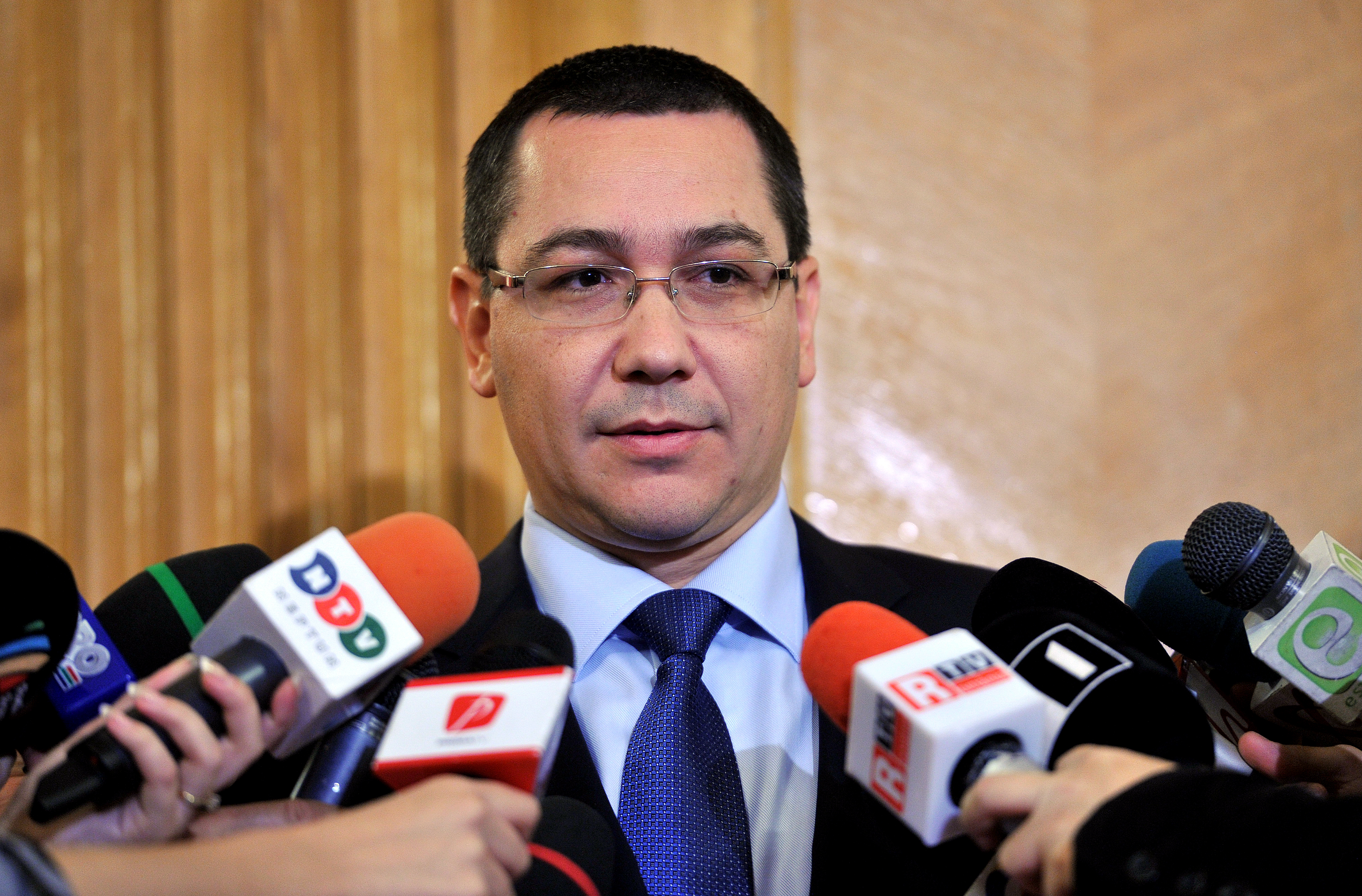
Prime Minister Victor Ponta is accused of 22 corruption acts.

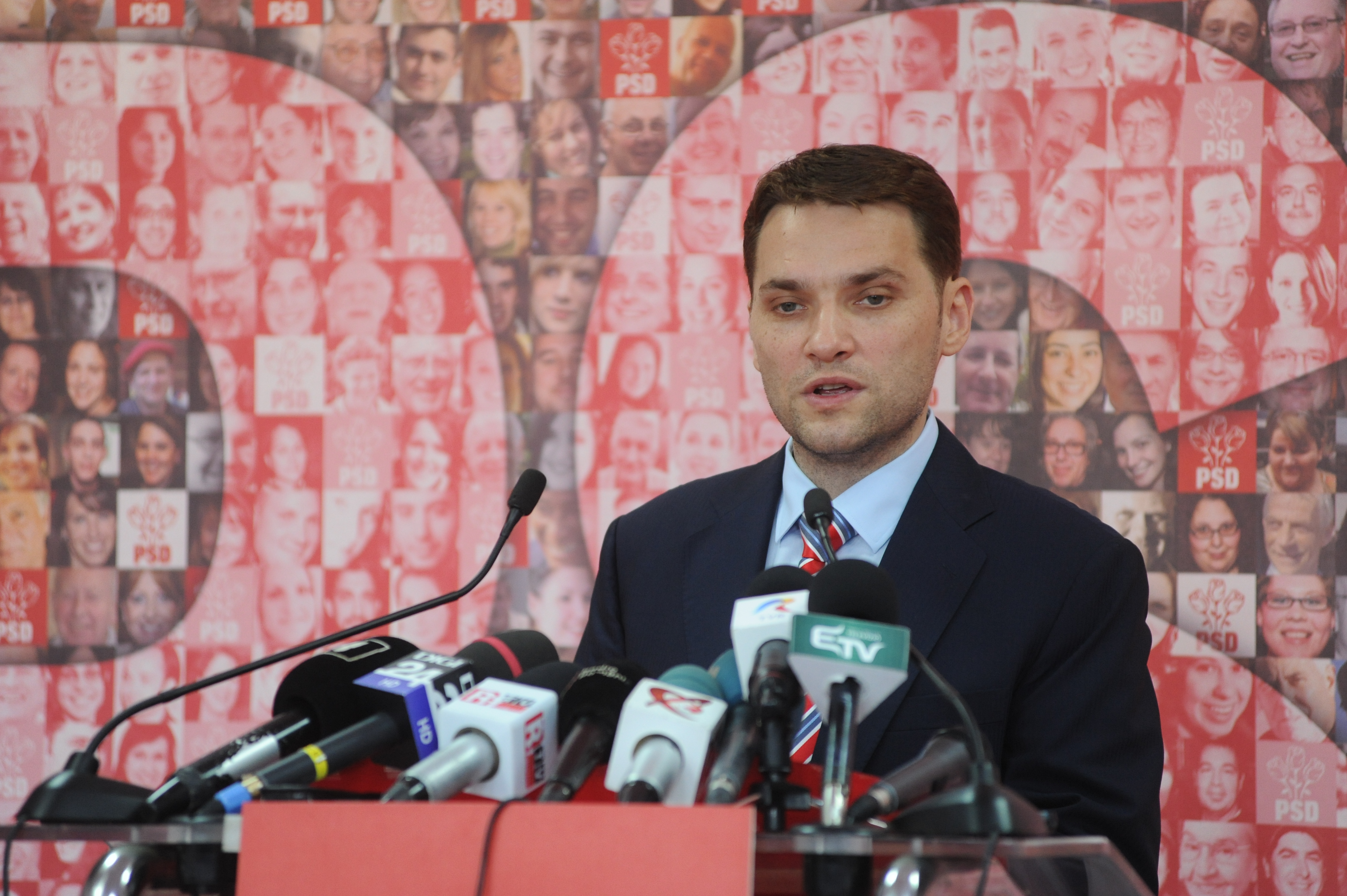
PSD senator Dan Șova is investigated under judicial supervision for forgery, tax evasion and money laundering.

DNA accuses Victor Ponta that between October 2007 and December 2008 received 181,439 lei from the law firm of Dan Șova, under an agreement of collaboration. To justify the money, Victor Ponta would be drawn up 17 fictitious invoices, because in reality Ponta wouldn't have provided any work for the law firm of Dan Șova. As a result of tax audits, Ponta would be made 16 false documents to justify his juridical work at the law firm. The documents would be made using the "copy-paste" method, according to DNA prosecutors. Of this money, Ponta has bought two luxury apartments in a residential complex in Bucharest. Apart from the money received from the law firm, Ponta has also benefited from a Mitsubishi Lancer Evolution X, free of charge, from the law firm of Șova. The firm paid the advance and rates of 6,000 lei per month for the car used by Ponta, in total about 80,000 lei. Subsequently, from the position of Prime Minister of Romania, Ponta promoted Dan Șova in the Government, for which DNA accuses the premier of conflict of interest, given that previously he had received money and a car from Șova.

On 5 June, DNA asked the Chamber of Deputies to approve premier's prosecution for conflict of interest, but the request was rejected by deputies, on 9 June. Lawmakers voted 231 against and 120 in favor of repealing Ponta's immunity.

PSD senator Dan Șova was prosecuted since August 2014 for three offenses of complicity to abuse of office, with obtaining undue advantages for himself or for another, after in 2007–2008 his firm, "Șova and Associates", concluded three contracts for legal aid with energy complexes Turceni and Rovinari, after which they would be prejudiced by nearly 3.5 million lei. In the same case are prosecuted Laurențiu Ciurel, director of Investment at Rovinari Energy Complex at the material time, and former general manager of Turceni Energy Complex, Dumitru Cristea, for abuse of office. Dan Șova is also investigated by the National Anticorruption Directorate in the case of illegal retrocession of forests, along with former PSD deputy Viorel Hrebenciuc and Victor Ponta's father-in-law, Ilie Sârbu. After a voting row, the Senate rejected on 2 June DNA request of retention and preventive arrest of Șova, being registered 66 votes "for" and 72 "against". As of 5 June, Dan Șova is under judicial review. Moreover, he's not allowed to leave the country or communicate with Victor Ponta.

On 13 July, Victor Ponta was summoned to DNA, where he was announced that was ordered a financial and accounting expertise. Also at that time, DNA changed his quality in this case from suspect to defendant, the premier relying on the right to silence, so that he didn't give any statement to the prosecutor. Some of his property has been seized pending the outcome of the case. Victor Ponta resigned as chairman of the ruling Social Democratic party a day earlier, saying he wanted to prove his innocence. On 19 August, prosecutors seized an apartment of Victor Ponta, to recover the prejudice of 51,321.80 lei that would be produced from his complicity in tax evasion, amount determined after assessment performed in the "Turceni–Rovinari" case. On 17 September, Victor Ponta was sent for trial, going to be held at the High Court of Cassation and Justice.

=== Reactions ===
==== Domestic ====
President Klaus Iohannis officially demanded the resignation of Victor Ponta. "It's an impossible situation for Romania as the premier is accused of criminal acts. I solicit the resignation of Prime Minister Victor Ponta", the president said after a meeting with Prime Minister Victor Ponta at the Cotroceni Palace. Shortly after Iohannis' request, Victor Ponta announced on Facebook that he would not resign, claiming that his term as prime minister depends on Parliament. Former President Traian Băsescu, one of the most vocal objectors of Victor Ponta, reacted vehemently by a post on Facebook: "if you want not to do more harm than you did the country from 2012 until now, please do one simple thing: leave now!". Former Justice Minister and current European Member of Parliament Monica Macovei said that Ponta's insistence on remaining head of government "is an act of betrayal that discredits Romania".

Main opposition party, PNL, demanded the resignation of the prime minister and proposed early legislative elections. PNL Co-President Alina Gorghiu called on PSD leaders not to delay the vote on DNA request to prosecute Victor Ponta. Moreover, PNL doesn't recognize the legitimacy of Ponta as prime minister and will boycott any talks involving PSD leader. As of 4 September, PNL had collected 1.2 million signatures for the resignation of Victor Ponta.

12 of the 42 PSD subsidiaries in the country expressed through communiques support for Prime Minister Victor Ponta, also leader of the party. They argue that Victor Ponta should not resign.

After Ponta's indictment, M10 and PMP asked his resignation, stating "Victor Ponta seriously dishonors Romania" and "the leaders of civilized countries no longer want to have anything to do with Victor Ponta".

== Motion of censure ==
A motion of censure was submitted to Parliament by the National Liberal Party on 5 June, the same day that Victor Ponta was accused of corruption. The motion is entitled "Victor Ponta – dismissed for abuse of power by blocking election. The right to vote is not a slogan!". In the text of the motion, the Liberals also refer the vote for DNA request in the case of Dan Șova and "hostile attitude towards justice". At the filing date, the motion has been signed by 183 MPs, of which 12 from the Romanian Social Party, two from the Democrat group, the rest being PNL deputies and senators. The motion was voted on 12 June. It gathered 194 votes for and 13 against, while seven votes were annulled. To overthrow the Government, the motion needed 278 votes. Of the 418 MPs present only 214 voted.

The motion of censure was linked by Victor Ponta and PSD members with an attempt to overthrow the Government through justice. This suspicion was rejected by members of the opposition, but also by the Chief Prosecutor of the National Anticorruption Directorate, Laura Codruța Kövesi. Moreover, the Prime Minister accuses that the case in which he is being investigated is politically orchestrated.
