= Ungureanu cabinet =

Ungureanu
- 120th Cabinet of Romania

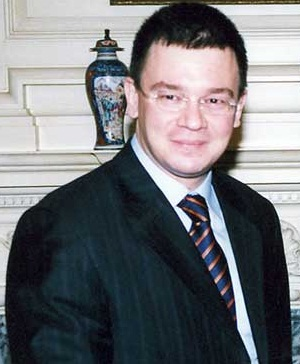
- Date formed: 9 February 2012
- Date dissolved: 7 May 2012

People and organisations
- Head of state: Traian Băsescu
- Head of government: Mihai Răzvan Ungureanu
- Member party: PDL, UDMR, UNPR
- Status in legislature: Coalition
- Opposition party: Social Liberal Union (PSD, PNL, PC)
- Opposition leader: Victor Ponta (PSD); Crin Antonescu (PNL); Daniel Constantin (PC)

History
- Election: 30 November 2008
- Outgoing election: 2012
- Legislature term: 2008–2012
- Predecessor: Boc II
- Successor: Ponta I

The Ungureanu cabinet was a cabinet of ministers which briefly governed Romania during early 2012. Mihai Răzvan Ungureanu was designated by former President Traian Băsescu to form a new government after the previous PM before, more specifically Emil Boc, left office in the wake of the 2012 Romanian protests, decision officially approved by the state president on 9 February 2012. Ungureanu's cabinet did not last in office long as it was subsequently dissolved on 27 April 2012.

Coalition members: PDL, UNPR, UDMR, and Independent ministers

Office	Name	Party	Term start	Term end
Prime Minister	Mihai Răzvan Ungureanu	Ind.	9 February 2012	27 April 2012
Minister of Interior	Gabriel Berca	PDL	9 February 2012	27 April 2012
Minister of Justice	Cătălin Predoiu	Ind.	9 February 2012	27 April 2012
Minister of Health	Ladislau Ritli	UDMR	9 February 2012	27 April 2012
Minister of Foreign Affairs	Cristian Diaconescu	UNPR	9 February 2012	27 April 2012
Minister of National Defense	Gabriel Oprea	UNPR	9 February 2012	27 April 2012
Minister of Culture	Kelemen Hunor	UDMR	9 February 2012	27 April 2012
Minister of European Affairs	Leonard Orban	Ind.	9 February 2012	27 April 2012
Minister of Finance	Bogdan Drăgoi	PDL	9 February 2012	27 April 2012
Minister of Economy	Lucian Bode	PDL	9 February 2012	27 April 2012
Minister of Agriculture	Stelian Fuia	PDL	9 February 2012	27 April 2012
Minister of Environment	László Borbély	UDMR	9 February 2012	5 April 2012
Minister of Environment	Mihai Răzvan Ungureanu	Ind.	5 April 2012	10 April 2012
Minister of Environment	Attila Korodi	UDMR	10 April 2012	27 April 2012
Minister of Tourism	Cristian Petrescu	PDL	9 February 2012	27 April 2012
Minister of Education	Cătălin Baba	PDL	9 February 2012	27 April 2012
Minister of Communications	Răzvan Mustea-Șerban	PDL	9 February 2012	27 April 2012
Minister of Labour	Claudia Boghicevici	PDL	9 February 2012	27 April 2012
Minister of Transport	Alexandru Nazare	PDL	9 February 2012	27 April 2012
