= Ioan Rus =

Romanian politician

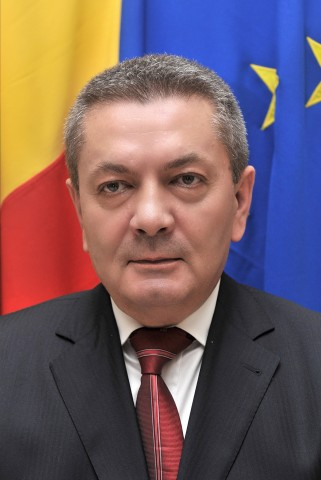
- Ioan Rus (2012)

Interior Minister
- In office 28 December 2000 – 11 March 2004
- President: Ion Iliescu
- Prime Minister: Adrian Năstase
- Preceded by: Constantin Dudu Ionescu
- Succeeded by: Marian Săniuță
- In office 7 May 2012 – 6 August 2012
- President: Traian Băsescu
- Prime Minister: Victor Ponta
- Preceded by: Gabriel Berca
- Succeeded by: Mircea Dușa

Transport Minister
- In office 24 June 2014 – 16 July 2015
- President: Traian Băsescu; Klaus Johannis
- Prime Minister: Victor Ponta
- Preceded by: Dan Șova
- Succeeded by: Iulian Matache

Personal details
- Born: 21 February 1955 (age 71) Urișor, Cluj County, Romania
- Citizenship: Romania
- Party: PSD
- Education: Technical University of Cluj-Napoca
- Occupation: politician engineer

Ioan Rus (born 21 February 1955) is a Romanian politician.

== Biography ==
Born in Urișor, Cluj County, he is a 1982 graduate of the Mechanics faculty of the Technical University of Cluj-Napoca. A member of the Social Democratic Party (PSD) since 1994, he was prefect of his home county in 1995, president of its county council from June to December 2000, Interior Minister from December 2000 to June 2003, and again from May to August 2012, when he resigned in the aftermath of the presidential impeachment referendum.

In June 2014, following the resignation of Dan Șova, he was named Transport Minister. In June 2015, he created a controversy when commenting about Romanians working in Western Europe. He asserted that on a hypothetical monthly salary of €1500, "their children become hoodlums at home and their wives turn into whores". Rus subsequently tendered his resignation.
