= Govora Power Station =

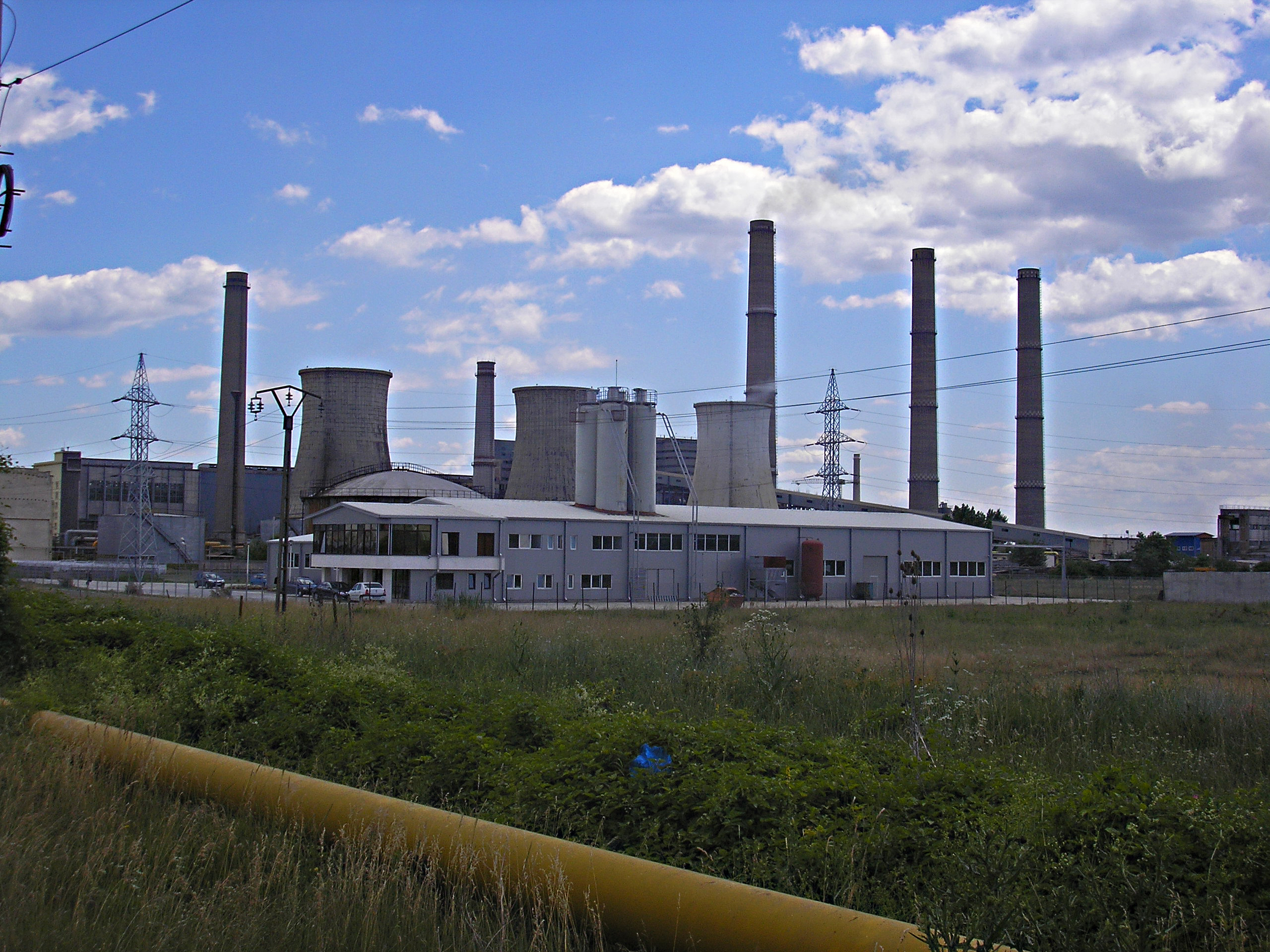
- Country: Romania
- Location: Râmnicu Vâlcea
- Coordinates: 45°02′20″N 24°17′14″E
- Status: Operational
- Owner: Termoelectrica

Thermal power station
- Primary fuel: Natural gas and coal

Power generation
- Units operational: 4
- Nameplate capacity: 200 MW

External links
- Website: www.cet-govora.ro

The Govora Power Station is a large thermal power plant located in Râmnicu Vâlcea, having 4 generation groups of 50 MW each having a total electricity generation capacity of 200 MW.

Coordinates: 45.038945°N 24.287274°E
