= Daniel Chițoiu =

Romanian economist and politician

Deputy Prime Minister of Romania
- In office 21 December 2012 – 19 February 2014
- President: Traian Băsescu
- Prime Minister: Victor Ponta
- Preceded by: Florin Georgescu
- Succeeded by: Victor Ponta; Daniel Constantin

Minister of Economy and Finance
- In office 2012 – 4 March 2014
- President: Traian Băsescu
- Prime Minister: Victor Ponta
- Preceded by: Florin Georgescu
- Succeeded by: Ioana Petrescu

Personal details
- Born: 11 July 1967 (age 58) Păușești, Vâlcea County, Romania

Daniel Chițoiu (born July 11, 1967) is a Romanian economist who served as the country's Finance Minister from December 2012 to March 2014.
