= Radu Stroe =

Ronanian navigational engineer and politician (1949–2025)

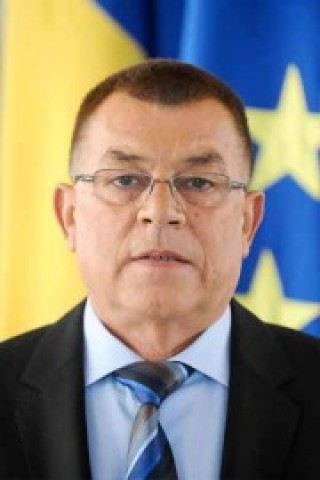
- Stroe in 2012

Minister of Internal Affairs of Romania
- In office 21 December 2012 – 23 January 2014
- President: Traian Băsescu
- Preceded by: Mircea Dușa
- Succeeded by: Gabriel Oprea

Personal details
- Born: 31 August 1949 Osoi, Romanian People's Republic
- Died: 12 June 2025 (aged 75) Bucharest, Romania
- Party: Independent
- Other political affiliations: National Liberal Party (2010–2016)
- Education: University of Bucharest

Radu Stroe (31 August 1949 – 12 June 2025) was a Romanian navigational engineer and politician. An independent, he was once a member of the National Liberal Party (PNL). He was a member of the Romanian Chamber of Deputies for Maramureș County from 2000 to 2004, and sat in the Romanian Senate from 2004 to 2008, representing the same county. He returned to the Chamber in 2010, representing Bucharest, and started a new term in 2012, sitting for Ilfov County. In the Călin Popescu-Tăriceanu cabinet, he was Minister Delegate for the General Secretariat of the Government from 2006 to 2007. In Victor Ponta's first cabinet, he was Minister Delegate for Administration between August and December 2012, when he was promoted to Interior Minister. He resigned that post in January 2014.

== Early life and education ==
Radu Stroe was born in Osoi, Iași County, and in 1971 graduated from the Civilian Marine Institute in Constanța, with a speciality in Navigational Engineering. In 1981, he received a law degree from the University of Bucharest. From 1972 to 1974, Stroe worked as a naval officer and navigational engineer at Navrom Constanța. From 1974 to 1985, he was in the Department of Marine Transport at the Ministry of Transport and Telecommunications, working as a principal engineer; he belonged to the Romanian Communist Party and was a Union of Communist Youth activist within the ministry. From 1985 to 1989, he was a principal engineer at the headquarters of the Danube-Bucharest Canal.

== Political career ==
Following the 1989 Revolution, Stroe joined the PNL and returned to the Transport Ministry, where, until 1996, he was successively promoted to adjunct general director, general director and adviser to the minister. In 1997–1998, he was adjunct secretary general to the Victor Ciorbea government, while in 1998–2000, he was secretary general in the governments of Radu Vasile and Mugur Isărescu. At the 2000 election, he won a seat in the Chamber, where he was on the permanent bureau during 2001. He moved up to the Senate at the 2004 election, but lost his bid for re-election in 2008. Stroe drew controversy during his first ministerial service (May 2006-April 2007): he was accused of a conflict of interest for serving both as president of the joint parliamentary committee providing oversight to the activities of Serviciul Român de Informaţii, and as a member of the government, something forbidden by parliamentary resolution in 1993. However, he refused to abandon either post. He did resign as minister in January 2007 after being defeated at a PNL congress for the office of vice president for administrative affairs, although the prime minister ignored the resignation and kept him on until a cabinet shuffle that April. The following February, the PNL proposed moving Teodor Meleșcanu from the Defence to the Justice ministry and placing Stroe at Defence, but President Traian Băsescu rejected the idea.

From 2009 to 2010, Stroe was project director at an information technology consulting firm. In January 2010, following the resignation of Bogdan Olteanu, Stroe contested the vacant Bucharest constituency at a by-election. His opponent was Honorius Prigoana, Jr. of the Democratic Liberal Party (PDL); the Social Democratic Party (PSD) did not field a candidate, instead supporting Stroe, who was elected with 70% of the vote. Back in the Chamber, he sits on the defence, public order and national security committee, as he did from 2001 to 2008 in both houses of Parliament. Within his party, Stroe was executive secretary, a member of the Sector 1 permanent bureau and a member of the Permanent Central Bureau; he was elected the party's secretary general in March 2009.

=== Minister of Internal Affairs (2012–2014) ===
In August 2012, following a cabinet reshuffle, he returned to government, being named Minister Delegate for Administration by Prime Minister Victor Ponta. That December, when he was elected to a new term in the Chamber, he was also named Interior Minister in Ponta's second cabinet. Stroe resigned in early 2014, following the deadly crash of a medical aircraft in the Apuseni Mountains. His ministry was blamed for poor handling of rescue operations, and his departure came following pressure from party colleagues and the media. That April, he was expelled from the PNL for breaching party discipline, and stated he would remain in the Chamber as an independent.

== Personal life and death ==
Stroe was married to Victoria Stroe; the couple were later divorced.

Stroe died at Gerota Hospital in Bucharest, on 12 June 2025, at the age of 75.
