= Mircea Dușa =

Romanian politician (1955–2022)

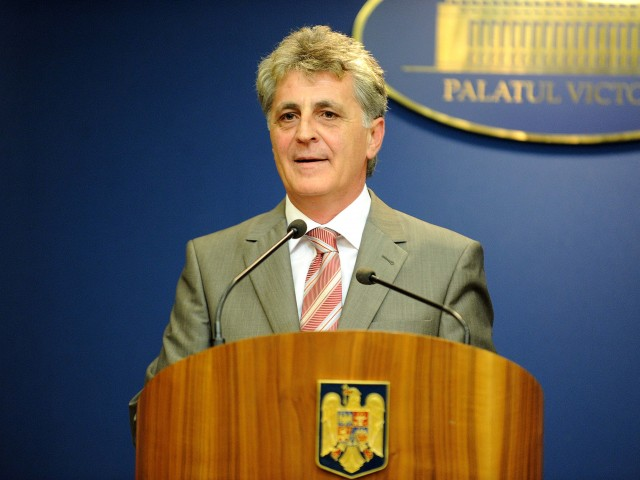

Interior Minister
- In office 6 August 2012 – 21 December 2012
- Prime Minister: Victor Ponta
- Preceded by: Ioan Rus
- Succeeded by: Radu Stroe

Minister of National Defence
- In office 21 December 2012 – 17 November 2015
- Prime Minister: Victor Ponta
- Preceded by: Corneliu Dobrițoiu
- Succeeded by: Mihnea Motoc

Personal details
- Born: 1 April 1955 Toplița, Magyar Autonomous Region, Romanian People's Republic
- Died: 19 December 2022 (aged 67) Târgu Mureș, Romania
- Resting place: Nazna Cemetery, Sâncraiu de Mureș
- Party: Romanian Communist Party (1976–1989); Social Democratic Party (1996–2022)
- Other political affiliations: Social Liberal Union (2011–2014)
- Education: University of Bucharest

Mircea Dușa (1 April 1955 – 19 December 2022) was a Romanian economist and politician, who was the minister of the Interior from 6 August to 21 December 2012, and then Minister of National Defense from 21 December 2012 to 17 November 2015, both times in the cabinets of former Prime Minister Victor Ponta.

== Life and career ==
Dușa was born to Romanian working-class parents in Toplița in the Magyar Autonomous Region during the Communist regime. He finished his secondary education in 1974 and for two years fulfilled his military service. In 1976, he returned to civilian life and became an official with the City People's Council in Toplița. In 1978 he joined the ranks of the Romanian Communist Party. He was elected to the board of his city in 1986 and held the position of vice president until 1990, after which he became vice mayor, and then mayor (1996–2000). In 1996 he joined the Social Democratic Party and from 2001 to 2004 he was prefect of Mureș County. In 2004, Dușa was elected to the Chamber of Deputies, as part of the Harghita County delegation.

On 4 November 2015, Dușa was proposed as Prime Minister of the Interim Government after the resignation of Victor Ponta by the latter; however, Romanian President Klaus Iohannis appointed Sorin Cîmpeanu, the Minister of National Education, as acting prime minister on the following day, instead of Dușa.

Dușa died of cancer on 19 December 2022, at the age of 67. He was buried with military honors at Nazna Cemetery, in Sâncraiu de Mureș.
