= Dan Șova =

Romanian lawyer and politician

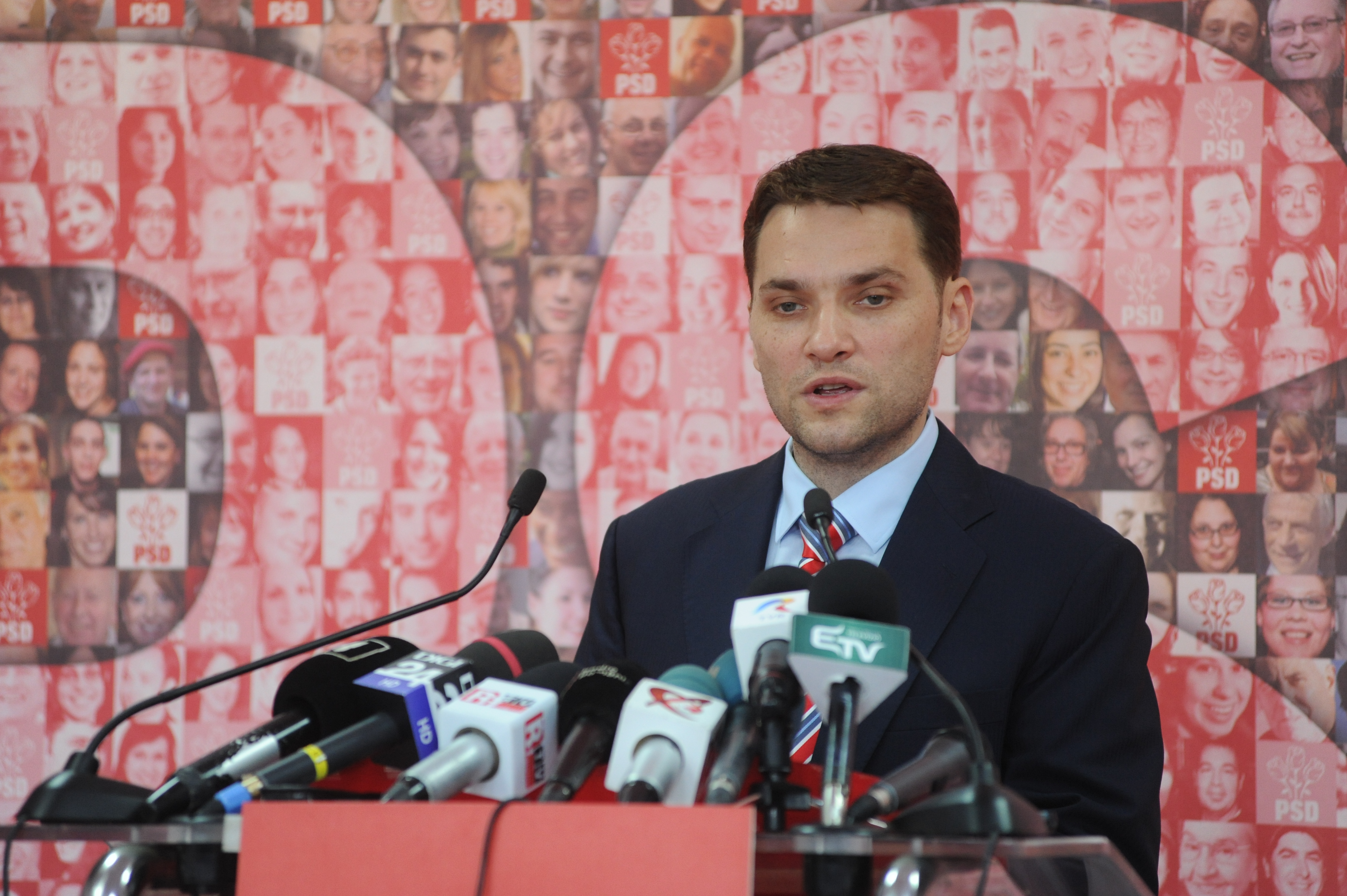

Minister for Infrastructure Projects of National Interest and Foreign Investment
- In office 21 December 2012 – 5 March 2014
- Prime Minister: Victor Ponta

Minister of Transportation
- In office 5 March 2014 – 24 June 2014
- Prime Minister: Victor Ponta
- Preceded by: Ramona Mănescu
- Succeeded by: Ioan Rus

Member of the Senate of Romania
- In office 19 December 2008 – 26 May 2015
- Constituency: 30-Olt, Electoral district No. 3

Personal details
- Born: 9 April 1973 (age 53) Bucharest, Socialist Republic of Romania
- Party: Social Democratic Party (until 2014)
- Education: University of Bucharest
- Profession: Lawyer

Dan-Coman Șova (born 9 April 1973 in Bucharest) is a Romanian lawyer and politician. A member of the Social Democratic Party (PSD), he has sat in the Romanian Senate from 2008 to 2015, representing Olt County.

Dan Șova served as Minister for Infrastructure Projects of National Interest and Foreign Investment (21 December 2012 to 5 March 2014) and Minister of Transportation (5 March to 24 June 2014). Previously, he served as Minister Delegate for Liaison with Parliament

He graduated from the Faculty of Law (1995) and the Faculty of History (2001) of the University of Bucharest.

On 17 September 2015, Șova was sent to court together with the former Prime Minister Victor Ponta, for acts of corruption related to the energy complexes at Rovinari and Turceni. He was accused of receiving undue benefits, together with other defendants, through addenda to ongoing contracts with the Turceni and Rovinari energy complexes, resulting in damages of over 3 million lei to the Romanian state. On December 29, 2023, the Supreme Court of Cassation and Justice definitively acquitted Dan Șova in this case.

On 26 January 2016, Șova was sued by the National Anticorruption Directorate for influence peddling in a case related to the Govora Power Station. On 17 February 2026, the Supreme Court of Cassation and Justice ordered his acquittal on the grounds that the statute of limitations had expired.

== See also ==
- Investigations involving Victor Ponta
- List of corruption scandals in Romania

=== External links ===
- (in Romanian) Profile at the Romanian Senate site
- (in Romanian) Official website
