= List of corruption scandals in Romania =

This is a list of notable corruption scandals in Romania.

== Investigations resulting in final sentences ==
People involved (office held/occupation)	Date	Details	Conviction date
Liviu Dragnea (President of the Chamber of Deputies, President of Social Democratic Party)	2006–2013	Sentenced to 3 1/2 years imprisonment for instigating to abuse of power.	27 May 2019
Radu Mazăre (former mayor of Constanța); Cristi Borcea (businessman); Nicușor Constantinescu (former chairman of the Constanța County Council)	2004	Mazăre was sentenced to 9 years imprisonment for abuse of power in a case related to a sale of a 15,000 sqm-plot of land in the Mamaia resort. Cristi Borcea and Nicușor Constantinescu received a 5-year imprisonment sentence.	8 February 2019
Dan Șova (former senator and minister in several Ponta cabinets)	2011–2014	Sentenced to 3 years imprisonment and €100,000 forfeiture for influence peddling.	20 June 2018
Elena Udrea (former Minister of Regional Development and Tourism in all Boc cabinets)	2011	Sentenced to 6 years imprisonment and to an asset forfeiture of €2.6 million for bribery and abuse of power in the "Bute Gala" case The six-year sentence in the "Bute Gala" trial was suspended by the High Court of Cassation and Justice on 21 December 2018 following the Constitutional Court's ruling that all high court's judge panels had not been formed legally.	5 June 2018 -
Adrian Severin (Member of the European Parliament (MEP))	2010-2011	Convicted for bribery and influence-peddling in the 2011 cash for influence scandal. Sentenced to 4 years imprisonment.	16 November 2016
Dorin Cocoș (Businessman); Gabriel Sandu (Minister of Communications between 2008 and 2010); Gheorghe Ștefan (former Mayor of Piatra Neamț); Nicolae Dumitru (ro) (Businessman)	2008–2010	Microsoft licensing corruption scandal: Dorin Cocoș, businessman and former spouse of Elena Udrea, was sentenced to 2 years 4 months imprisonment (in March 2016 sentenced to 2 years imprisonment) for influence peddling and money laundering, and to an asset forfeiture of €9 million (previously to €3 million). Gabriel Sandu was sentenced to 3 years imprisonment (previously to 2 years imprisonment) for bribery and money laundering, and to an asset forfeiture of over €2 million. Gheorghe Ștefan was sentenced to 6 years imprisonment (previously 3 years imprisonment) for influence peddling and to an asset forfeiture of over €3 million. Nicolae Dumitru was convicted to 2 years 4 months imprisonment (previously 1 1/2 years suspended sentence), $2,050,000 and €1 million forfeiture (previously €1 million forfeiture and 90 days community service).	3 October 2016
Nicușor Constantinescu (former chairman of the Constanța County Council)	2009–2013	Sentenced to five years imprisonment (before the appeal to 3 1/2 years) for abuse of power in a case related to the underfunding of the Zonal Military Center in Constanța	29 June 2016
Mircea Băsescu (Businessman)	2011–2016	Sentenced to 4 years imprisonment for influence-peddling by taking bribes from a Roma clan in return for promising to secure the early release of the clan's convicted boss, Sandu Anghel aka Bercea Mondialu'. Mircea Băsescu is the younger brother of Traian Băsescu, the former president of Romania, as well as the godfather of Sandu Anghel's granddaughter.	16 June 2016
Veronica Cîrstoiu (Judge at the Bucharest Court of Appeal)	2012	Convicted for receiving a bribe of approximately €630,000 and using her influence to reach a favourable judgement for a defendant in a criminal case. Sentenced to 7 years imprisonment	2 June 2016
Liviu Dragnea (Member of Parliament; Leader of the Social Democratic Party; former Deputy Prime-Minister)	2012	Convicted for using his political influence to mastermind a campaign in swinging a referendum (impeachment) vote against former president Traian Băsescu in 2012, through the use of bribes and forged ballot papers. He was handed a suspended sentence of 2 years.	22 April 2016
Gheorghe Hânsă (Mayor of Cernavodă)	2005–2008	Sentenced to 3 years 8 months for official misconduct by concluding contracts detrimental to the town's finances. His son, Tiberiu Marius Hânsă, was sentenced to 3 years 2 months for complicity in the crime perpetrated by his father.	13 April 2016
Florin Aurelian Popescu (Member of Parliament, former President of the Dâmbovița County Council)	2012	Sentenced to 2 years imprisonment for official misconduct. Using his position as leader of the local Democratic Liberal Party organization and President of the Dâmbovița County Council, Florin Popescu requested a local entrepreneur that 60,992 kilos grilled chicken be delivered to him. Subsequently, Florin Popescu distributed the chicken to the potential voters during the electoral campaign for the 2012 local elections.	14 March 2016
Alin Trășculescu (Member of Parliament)	2010–2012	Sentenced to 3 years in prison for influence-peddling, instigation to money laundering, embezzlement and forgery.	4 March 2016
Constantin Boșcodeală (Mayor of Buzău)	2002–2008	Sentenced to 3 years probation for official misconduct and banned from running for the mayor office for 5 years	1 March 2016
Codruț Șereș (Minister of Economy)	2002–2004	Sentenced to 4 years imprisonment for embezzlement of funds belonging to the Hidroelectrica company	29 February 2016
Gruia Stoica (Founder and President of the Grampet Group; CEO of Grup Feroviar Român, the largest private rail cargo company in Romania)	2013	Sentenced to 2 1/2 years probation and 90 days community service for influence buying	23 February 2016
Marian Neacșu (Member of Parliament, Secretary-General of the Social Democratic Party)	2009	Sentenced to 6 months probation for conflict of interest after illegally hiring his own daughter at his MP office	23 February 2016
Marian Ghiveciu (Member of Parliament)	2005–2006	Sentenced to 3 years probation for instigation to official misconduct in a case related to illegal retrocession of land plots in the Merei commune, Buzău County.	23 February 2016
Adrian Grăjdan (Head of the State Inspectorate for Constructions (ISC))	2012	Convicted for the crime of favouring the perpetrator (obstruction of justice) when four days after he was appointed Head of the ISC, he withdrew all the graft claims of the ISC against convicted former prime minister Năstase, despite the fact that the ISC suffered damages amounting to €1.5 million. Sentenced to 3 1/2 years probation.	22 February 2016
Nicolae Matei (Mayor of Năvodari)	2012	Convicted for attempting to bribe a high-ranking policeman with two plots of land in Năvodari valued at €46,160, in return for shielding Nicolae Matei from a criminal investigation by influencing the evidence against him. Sentenced to 1 1/2 years imprisonment.	19 February 2016
Ioan Stan (Member of Parliament)	2012	Convicted for requesting a 130,000 lei (€31,000) bribe in return for influence-peddling. He received 60,000 lei (€14,300) in three installments that he partially used for election campaigning. Additionally, he indirectly received products for his election campaign with a value of 535,000 lei (€127,400). Sentenced to 2 years imprisonment.	25 January 2016
Mihai Toader (CEO of Romanian Post)	2008	Sentenced to 8 1/2 years in prison for acquiring software products from a Cyprus-based company at a price overvalued by 12 times. The damage is estimated at €6.5 million.	15 October 2015
Cristian Poteraș (Mayor of Sector 6 (Bucharest))	2006	Sentenced to 8 years in prison for abuse of office in a case related to illegal retrocession of lands in Romania's capital.	22 May 2015
Ioan Niculae (Richest man in Romania in April 2014, according to Forbes)	2009	Sentenced to two years and a half imprisonment for illegally financing the Social Democratic Party's presidential campaign in 2009.	2 April 2015
Monica Iacob Ridzi (Minister of Youth and Sport)	2009	Sentenced to five years in prison for embezzling money that was spent by the Ministry on the Youth Day festivities	16 February 2015
Miron Mitrea (Member of Parliament)	2001–2002	Sentenced to 2 years imprisonment for receiving a €300,000 bribe in exchange for keeping Irina Jianu as chief-inspector of the State Inspectorate for Constructions.	13 February 2015
Constantin Nicolescu (Senator; former chairman of the Argeș County Council); Gheorghe Nicuț (Mayor of Curtea de Argeș); Andrei Călin Ioan (Mayor of Câmpulung); Ştefan Ion (Mayor of Budeasa); Ioan Popa Ioan (Mayor of Stâlpeni)	2006-2008	Convicted for using false documents to contract financing of €900,000 from European funds that should have been used to revamp four schools. Revamping work was carried out by a company called Zeus SA. Nicolescu was also convicted for having taken a €60,000 bribe from businessman Cornel Penescu and sentenced to 7 years in prison.	5 February 2015
George Copos (Wealthy businessman; Member of Parliament; Deputy Prime-Minister)	2004	Sentenced for 4 years imprisonment for tax evasion of around $1 million that was linked to the sale of several retail spaces from his company, Ana Electronics, to the Romanian National Lottery.	25 August 2014
Dan Voiculescu (Senator; Founder of the Conservative Party; Wealthy businessman/Oligarch; former Securitate agent); Gheorghe Mencinicopschi (Director of the Food Research Institute)	2003	Voiculescu was sentenced to 10 years in prison for using his political influence in the privatization of the Food Research Institute which had an estimated value of €7.7 million, but was instead bought by his company, Grivco at an undervalued price of €100,000. According to the prosecutors, the damages brought to the Romanian state amounted to over €60 million.	8 August 2014
Sorin Apostu (Mayor of Cluj-Napoca)	2009–2011	Sentenced to 4 1/2 years in prison for taking a €94,000 bribe in exchange for signing contracts related to the car insurance of the City Hall's cars and garbage trucks.	7 July 2014
Gabriel Boriga (Mayor of Târgoviște)		Convicted for buying playgrounds equipment from his godson's company at a price estimated to be €100,000 higher than the market prices for that particular product. He received a 3-year suspended sentence.	23 May 2014
Emilian Valentin Frâncu (Mayor of Râmnicu Vâlcea)	2012	Sentenced to 4 years in prison for receiving a bribe in exchange for awarding a contract for the construction of an overpass.	26 March 2014
Relu Fenechiu (Minister of Transportation)	2002–2004	Fenechiu sold a number of old electrical transformers to Electrica Moldova at a highly inflated price of 2.8 million €. He was sentenced to 5 years imprisonment.	30 January 2014
Gheorghe Coman (Member of Parliament)	2002–2004	Sentenced to 1 year imprisonment for receiving a 3000 lei bribe (ca. 670 Euro)	30 January 2014
Tudor Chiuariu (Minister of Justice); Zsolt Nagy (Minister of Communications); Mihai Toader (General Manager of the Romanian Post)	2005–2007	Chiuariu and Nagy illegally transferred some real estate owned by the Romanian Post to a private company. Chiuariu received a suspended sentence of 3½ years, while Nagy received a suspended sentence of 4 years.	24 January 2014
Sorin Andi Pandele (Member of Parliament); Costel Zamfir (Mayor of Bradu)	2007	Pandele received a 190,000 lei bribe in exchange of illegally issuing a land deed. He was sentenced to 5 years imprisonment.	21 January 2014
Adrian Năstase (Prime Minister of Romania)	2001–2004	Năstase received as bribe some Chinese-made building materials and furnishings worth €630,000 from a construction entrepreneur, Irina Jianu, who, in exchange, was appointed the director of the State Construction Inspectorate. He was handed a four-year prison sentence for taking bribes and a three-year prison sentence for blackmail, to run concurrently.	6 January 2014
Dan Păsat (Member of Parliament)	2009–2010	Păsat was sentenced to 4 years imprisonment for blackmailing mayors of Giurgiu County communes to obtained contracts for his private company, Prod Invest SRL.	12 December 2013
Mircia Muntean (Mayor of Deva, Member of Parliament)	1999	Muntean, as mayor, performed a land exchange with Iosif Man, through which the City Hall lost an estimated $360,000. He received a 4-year suspended sentence.	24 September 2013
Antonie Solomon (Mayor of Craiova)	2002–2004	Solomon received a €50,000 bribe from businessman Cornel Penescu in order to issue a building permit for a hypermarket. Sentenced to 3 years in prison.	20 September 2013
Ion Dumitru (Member of Parliament; Director of Romsilva)		Dumitru acquired for Romsilva for $294,330 a Ukrainian-made 1970s bulldozer that had a value of $6,250; the equipment was never used as it was not suitable for the task it was bought. He received a 3-year suspended sentence.	7 June 2013
Victor Babiuc (Minister of Defence); Dumitru Cioflină (Chief of General Staff, Army General); Gigi Becali (Wealthy businessman; Founder of the New Generation Party; Member of European Parliament; Member of Romanian Parliament)	1998	A land swap through which the Romanian state lost almost $1 million. Each of them was sentenced to 2 years in prison.	20 May 2013
Nicolae Mischie (President of the Gorj County Council)		Mischie received between businessman Clement Mocanu renovation services for three of his buildings, as well as bribes, in exchange for a contract for renovation of the historic building Casa Gănescu. Sentenced to 4 years in prison.	18 March 2013
Dorin Dăneșan (Mayor of Sighișoara)		Dăneșan signed a lease contract given by the City Hall to a company owned by the mayor's brother. He was handed a 2-year suspended sentence.	14 March 2013
Adrian Năstase (Prime Minister of Romania)	2004	Using a state-funded conference as a front to raise money for his presidential campaign. Sentenced to 2 years in prison.	20 June 2012
Gheorghe Medințu (vice-president of PSD Arad)		Medințu was involved in a scandal involving the bribing of Ilie Stana in order to illegally obtain loans worth 2000 billion old lei. Medințu was given a 7-year prison sentence.	23 April 2012
Cătălin Voicu (Senator/Member of Parliament); Marius Locic (Businessman); Costel Cășuneanu (Businessman); Florin Costiniu (Judge)	2009	The businessmen gave bribes to Voicu in order to solve, with the help of Judge Costiniu, their commercial and penal offenses. Voicu was sentenced to 7 years imprisonment.	22 April 2012
Virgil Pop (Member of Parliament)		Pop received bribes (30,000-€50,000) in exchange of contracts with Transelectrica Cluj. Sentenced to 5 years in prison.	18 April 2012
Decebal Traian Remeș (Minister of Agriculture); Ioan Avram Mureşan (former Minister of Agriculture)	2007	Remeș received from businessman Gheorghe Ciorbă €15,000, an Audi Q7 and various products in exchange for winning public contracts. They were sentenced to 3 years imprisonment each.	14 February 2012
Eugen Bădălan (Member of Parliament, Army General, former Chief of General Staff)	2000	Signed various deals with a private company, Tofan Grup SA, causing a damage of 1.26 million € to the Army. Sentenced to 4 years probation.	7 December 2011
Dan Ilie Morega (Member of Parliament)	2008	Morega requested bribes from public companies for the National Liberal Party electoral campaign in exchange for preserving political support for their directors. He was given a 3-year suspended sentence.	11 November 2011
Cosmin Mihai Popescu (Member of Parliament); Ionel Manțog (director of Turceni Power Station)		Popescu was sentenced to 2 years probation and Manțog to 5 years imprisonment for buying land that was then expropriated as eminent domain at high prices.|	11 April 2011
Vasile Emilian Cutean (Secretary of State for Revolutionary-related Issues)	2004	Sentenced to 5 years in prison for embezzlement of state funds, which were paid into the accounts of an association of which he was the president.	4 April 2011
Mihail Sirețeanu (Member of Parliament)	2003-2004	Sirețeanu defrauded the state-owned Mizil Arms Factory of 6 billion old lei and received a 2-year suspended sentence.	9 February 2011
Vasile Duță (Senator)	2000-2004	Duță received money and goods (including a Mercedes worth €40,000) in exchange for influencing the decisions of various state bodies and he was sentenced to 5 years imprisonment.	5 May 2010
Mircia Gutău (Mayor of Râmnicu Vâlcea)	2006	Gutău requested a bribe of €50,000 from the owner of a local company, Rovimet, in exchange for an urban planning certificate, being caught in flagrante delicto. Sentenced to 2 1/2 years in prison.	17 March 2010
Cristian Anghel (Mayor of Baia Mare)		Anghel decided that the Baia Mare City Hall buy a building at an overvalued price (the damage being estimated at €394,500), the same building being bought for one third of the price days before that. Sentenced to 2 and half years imprisonment.	10 March 2010

== Investigations resulting in convictions, subject to appeal ==
People involved (office held/occupation)	Date	Details	Conviction date
Andreea Cosma (deputy, Social Democratic Party); Florin Serghei Anghel (former President of Prahova County Council); Dănuț Marcel Cornea (former councillor, Prahova County Council)	2008	Sentenced to 4 years imprisonment for complicity to abuse of power (Andreea Cosma), instigating to abuse of power (Florin Anghel) and abuse of power (Dănuț Marcel Cornea) in the case of selling the Ciuperceasca casern at an undervalued price.	4 December 2018
Constantin Nicolescu (former chairman of Argeș County Council)	2009	Sentenced to 8 years in prison for bribery.	5 May 2017
Nicușor Constantinescu (former chairman of Constanța County Council)		Sentenced to 15 years imprisonment for authorizing illegal payments in his role as chairman of the Constanța County Council, causing damages amounting to over 30 million lei (€6,725,000) to the Council and over 1 million lei (€224,000) to the Romanian state.	29 July 2016
Nicușor Constantinescu (former chairman of Constanța County Council)	2008–2011	Sentenced to six years imprisonment for abuse of power in a case related to not issuing or extending permits for wind farms	27 June 2016
Dumitru Dragomir (former chairman of the Professional Football League)	2009–2014	Dumitru Dragomir was sentenced to 7 years imprisonment for tax evasion, embezzlement and money laundering.	23 June 2016
Gabriel Popoviciu (Businessman); Ioan Niculae Alecu (former rector of the University of Agronomic Sciences and Veterinary Medicine, Bucharest); Ilie Cornel Şerban (former Director of the General Directorate for Intelligence and Internal Security); Petru Daniel Pitcovici (former chief of the Operations Division of the Anti-Corruption General Directorate)	2000–2004	The main charge of this corruption scandal is related to the sale of 224 hectares of land belonging to the University of Agronomic Sciences and Veterinary Medicine (UASVM) at an undervalued price. Gabriel Popoviciu (a.k.a. Puiu Popoviciu) was sentenced to 9 years imprisonment, Ioan Niculae Alecu (the former rector of the UASVM) - to 6 years imprisonment, Ilie Cornel Şerban - to 2 years and a half imprisonment, Petru Daniel Pitcovici - to 2 years imprisonment.	23 June 2016
Ilie Carabulea (Wealthy businessman; founder and former CEO of Banca Comercială Carpatica)	2012–2013	Sentenced to 6 1/2 years imprisonment for bribery	8 March 2016
Gergely Olosz (Senator, former President of the Regulatory Authority for Energy)	2010–2011	Sentenced to 3 years imprisonment for influence-peddling	3 March 2016
Gheorghe Costin (Member of Parliament; Deputy Mayor of Beiuș)	2008	Convicted for fraud, false declarations and abuse of power. He provided preferential treatment in tenders for the company, Top Construct Group, whilst he was Deputy Mayor of Beiuș. Furthermore, he signed off on payments towards the company for false activities and works.	7 May 2015

== International scandals ==
- Dan Nica (Minister of Communications) was accused by Thomas Lundin (Manager of Ericsson Romania) of having received a bribe from him in exchange for contracts for the 112 emergency systems. The accusations were made during an arbitration between Ericsson and Lundin in Sweden. The case is also under investigation by the U.S. Securities and Exchange Commission.

== See also ==
- Corruption in Romania
- List of Romanian politicians convicted of crimes
- Nu da șpagă, an anti-corruption campaign
