= List of Romanian politicians convicted of crimes =

List of convicted Romanian politicians

The following is a list of convicted Romanian politicians.

== Presidents ==
- Nicolae Ceaușescu, convicted by a special military tribunal on charges of genocide and sabotage of the Romanian economy and sentenced to death

== Prime ministers ==
- Constantin Dăscălescu, sentenced in 1990 to life imprisonment for manslaughter
- Adrian Năstase, convicted in 2012 for two years in prison for misuse of a publicly funded conference to raise cash for his unsuccessful campaign in 2004. Convicted in 2014 for four years in prison for taking bribes and a three-year prison sentence for blackmail.

== Ministers ==
- Ion Dincă, Deputy Prime Minister (1980 – 1989), sentenced in February 1990 to life imprisonment and confiscation of all property
- Emil Bobu, Minister of Interior (1973 – 1975), Labor Minister (1979 – 1981), was found guilty of complicity in genocide for his role in issuing orders to fire during the Romanian Revolution of 1989 and received a term of life imprisonment and confiscation of all his personal property
- Decebal Traian Remeș, Minister of Agriculture, and Rural Development (4 April 2007 – 11 October 2007), sentenced in 2012 to three years' imprisonment for bribery.
- Victor Babiuc, Minister of Defense (1996 – 2000), was sentenced in 2013 to 2 years in prison for a land swap through which the Romanian state lost almost $1 million.
- George Copos, Deputy Prime-Minister (December 2004 – January 2006), was sentenced in 2014 to 4 years imprisonment for tax evasion of around $1 million that was linked to the sale of several retail spaces from his company, Ana Electronics, to the Romanian National Lottery.
- Tudor Chiuariu, Minister of Justice (5 April 2007 – 10 December 2007) and Zsolt Nagy, Minister of Communications (2004 – 2007), received in 2014 for corruption a 3½ and a four-year suspended sentence, respectively.
- Relu Fenechiu, Minister of Transportation (2012 – 2013), was sentenced in 2014 to 5 years imprisonment. Fenechiu sold a number of old electrical transformers to Electrica Moldova at a highly inflated price of 2.8 million €.
- Monica Iacob Ridzi, Minister of Youth and Sport (2008 – 2009), was sentenced in 2014 to five years in prison for embezzling money that was spent by the Ministry on the Youth Day festivities.
- Gabriel Sandu, Minister of Communications (2008 – 2010), was sentenced in 2016 to 3 years imprisonment (before the appeal to 2 years imprisonment) for bribery and money laundering, and to an asset forfeiture of over €2 million in the Microsoft licensing corruption scandal.
- Codruț Șereș, Minister of Economy and Commerce (2004 – 2006), was sentenced in 2016 to 4 years imprisonment for embezzlement of funds belonging to the Hidroelectrica company.
- Dan Șova, minister in several Ponta cabinets, was sentenced in 2018 to 3 years imprisonment and €100,000 forfeiture for influence peddling.
- Elena Udrea, Minister of Regional Development and Tourism (2009 – 2012), was sentenced in 2018 to 6 years imprisonment for bribery and abuse of power in the "Bute Gala" case.

== Senators ==
- Vasile Duță, sentenced in 2010 to 5 years imprisonment for influence peddling
- Cătălin Voicu, sentenced in 2012 to 7 years imprisonment for bribery
- Dan Voiculescu, sentenced in 2014 to 10 years in prison for using his political influence in the privatization of the Food Research Institute which had an estimated value of €7.7 million, but was instead bought by his company, Grivco at an undervalued price of €100,000 According to the prosecutors, the damages brought to the Romanian state amounted to over €60 million.
- Constantin Nicolescu, convicted in 2015 for using false documents to contract financing of €900,000 from European funds that should have been used to revamp four schools. Nicolescu was also convicted for having taken a €60,000 bribe from businessman Cornel Penescu and sentenced to 7 years in prison. Also sentenced in 2017 to 8 years in prison for bribery, sentence subject to appeal.
- Gergely Olosz, sentenced in 2016 to 3 years imprisonment for influence-peddling

== Deputies ==
- Liviu Dragnea, President of the Chamber of Deputies starting December 2016 and former Minister of Administration and Regional Development (2012-2015), convicted in a case involving electoral fraud, for which he received a two-year suspended sentence in April 2016. Dragnea was later sentenced to 3½ years in prison, in May 2019 after being found guilty of corruption.
