= Dan Nica =

Romanian engineer and politician

Dan Nica MEP
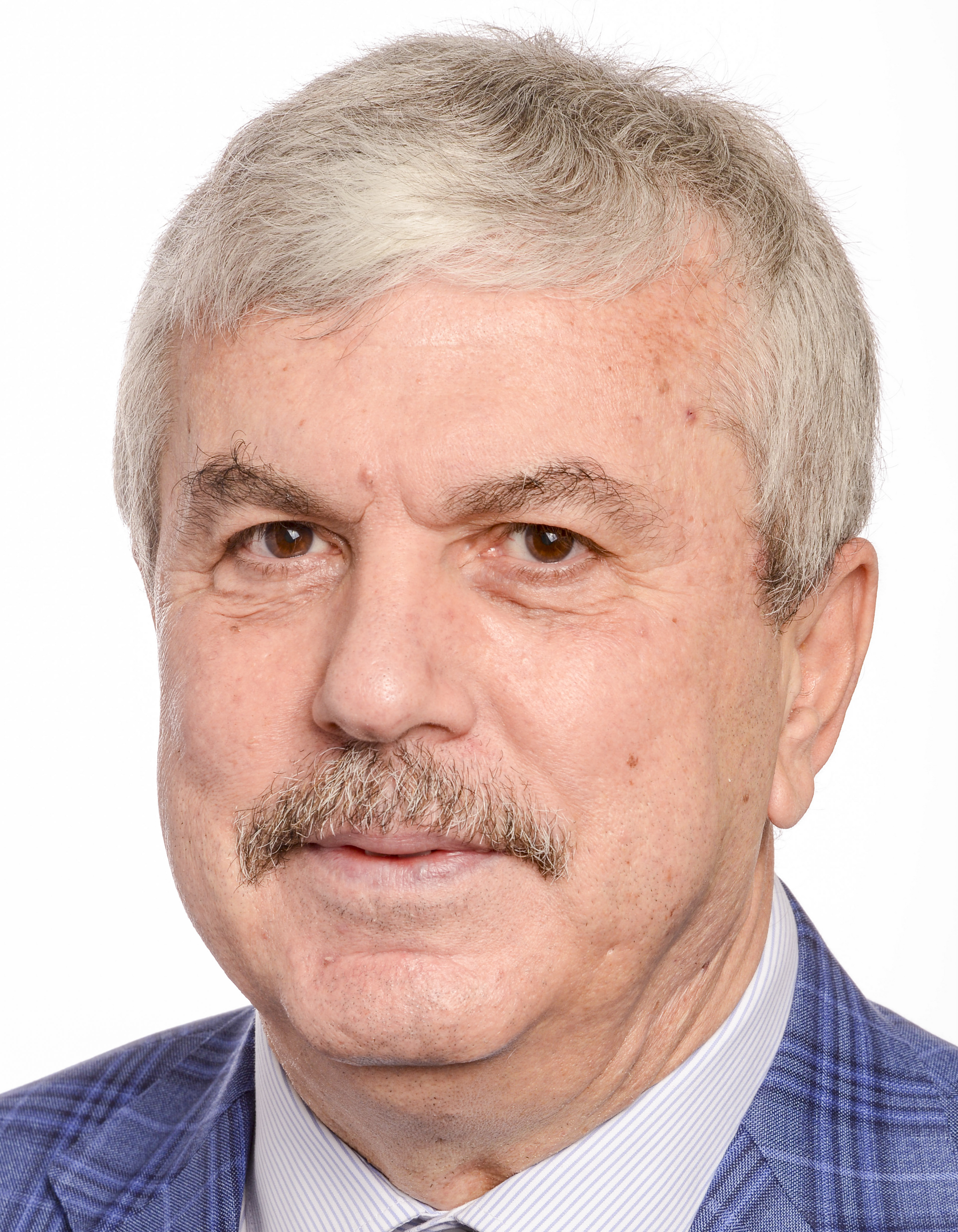
- Official portrait, 2024

Member of the European Parliament for Romania
- Incumbent
- Assumed office 1 July 2014

Minister of Communications
- In office 7 May 2012 – 5 March 2014
- Prime Minister: Victor Ponta
- Preceded by: Răzvan Mustea
- Succeeded by: Răzvan Cotovelea
- In office 28 December 2000 – July 2004
- Prime Minister: Adrian Năstase
- Succeeded by: Zsolt Nagy

Minister of Administration and Interior
- In office 13 January 2009 – 20 January 2009
- Prime Minister: Emil Boc
- Preceded by: Gabriel Oprea
- Succeeded by: Liviu Dragnea
- In office 2 February 2009 – 1 October 2009
- Prime Minister: Emil Boc
- Preceded by: Liviu Dragnea
- Succeeded by: Vasile Blaga (interim)

Member of the Chamber of Deputies
- In office 1996–2014

Personal details
- Born: 2 July 1960 (age 66) Panciu, Romania
- Party: Social Democratic Party (PSD)
- Other political affiliations: Progressive Alliance of Socialists and Democrats
- Education: Technical University of Iași
- Awards: Order of the Star of Romania, Knight rank

Dan Nica (Note: Romanian pronunciation: [dan ˈnika]) KSR (born July 2, 1960) is a Romanian engineer and politician. A member of the Social Democratic Party (PSD), he has been a Member of the European Parliament since 2014. He held a seat in the Romanian Chamber of Deputies for Galați County from 1996 to 2014. In the Adrian Năstase cabinet, he was Minister of Communications and Information Technology from 2000 to July 2004. In the Emil Boc cabinet, he was the Vice Prime Minister and Minister of Administration and Interior between February and October 2009. In the Victor Ponta cabinet, he served as Communications Minister for a second time, from May 2012 to February 2014.

== Biography ==
=== Early life and career ===
He was born in Panciu, Vrancea County and in 1985 graduated from the Electronics and Telecommunications Faculty of the Gheorghe Asachi Technical University of Iaşi. He also holds a 2005 doctorate in Communication Sciences, has co-designed three patented inventions, and authored the 2001 book Guvern, cetățean, societatea informațională ("Government, Citizen, IT Society"). From 1985 to 1996, he worked at the Galați County Telecommunications Directorate, and was its director from 1991 onward. In this capacity he coordinated a telephone-extension project, which resulted in the county becoming one of the first in Romania in which over 90% of households had a telephone. Concurrently, from 1993 to 1996, he was an associate professor at the University of Galați, teaching Telecommunications and Data Transmission.

In 1996, Nica was elected to the Chamber for the PDSR (PSD from 2001); he sat on the industry and services committee. From 1997 to 2003, he headed the Galați municipal party organisation, while from 1999 to 2003, he was first vice president of the PSD Galați County chapter, and from 1999 to 2004, he sat on the party's central executive bureau. He was re-elected in 2000, and was also part of the Năstase cabinet until July 2004, when he was dismissed during a reshuffle. During this period he belonged to the Chamber's public administration, land management and ecological equilibrium committee and introduced a law for supporting and promoting small and medium-sized businesses. Also, from 2002 to 2004, he was a member of the United Nations Information and Communication Technologies Task Force. He was elected again in 2004, following which he became vice president of the information technology and communications committee. During the 2004 campaign, the Coalition for a Clean Parliament, an NGO, accused him of lacking the moral integrity needed to sit in Parliament, claiming he had taken decisions as minister that benefited certain private companies at the expense of the state and of market competition. Cited were an order regulating taxes on mobile telephone carriers that allegedly saved one company around €10 million a year, and the charge that Nica dropped a clause in the Romtelecom privatisation contract in 2003. He sued for 1.5 billion lei (some $50,000) in damages, but lost.

=== In government and subsequently ===
A month after the 2008 election, in which Nica won yet another term in the Chamber, he was named vice premier in the Boc cabinet. In January 2009, following the resignation of Gabriel Oprea and before Liviu Dragnea took office, Nica was interim Interior Minister; when Dragnea resigned the following month, Nica again took over the ministry, a scenario that was one of several options discussed within the PSD. As vice premier, Nica had to play a balancing act when tensions appeared within the ruling PSD—PDL coalition, both urging that PSD (and PDL) ministers show "restraint" in their public statements about the other party, and criticising the PDL at times himself, for instance accusing Regional Development Minister Vasile Blaga of "arrogance" in his attitude toward PSD ministers. As Interior Minister, he took note of alleged fraud during the 2009 European Parliament election, promising that those who voted more than once would be arrested, and announcing soon after the polls closed that 35 penal dossiers had already been opened for offences that included attempted fraud and giving money and food to influence voters. In late September 2009, Nica alleged that all available buses had been rented for the first and second rounds of the upcoming presidential election, and that these would be used to transport voters to multiple polling stations so they could cast more than one ballot. Citing these comments and a deteriorating public safety situation that included a general rise in crime and a spate of armed robberies, Boc moved to dismiss Nica. On October 1, President Traian Băsescu approved Nica's dismissal, prompting all eight of his PSD cabinet colleagues to resign in protest that day.

He was elected one of the PSD's vice presidents in 2010. In May 2012, as part of the incoming Ponta cabinet, he returned to head the Communications Ministry, vowing to dismiss some 300 administrative staff and 90 of 100 managers at Poşta Română. At December's parliamentary election, he won a new seat in the Chamber with 75.4% of the vote, and was subsequently renamed as Communications Minister. By the time a new Ponta cabinet was created in early 2013, Nica was already on the PSD's electoral lists for the May European Parliament election, and opted against continuing in government—the only minister from his party to do so. At the election, he won a seat as an MEP. Subsequently, the National Anticorruption Directorate placed him under investigation for abuse of office as part of the Microsoft licensing corruption scandal. His case was closed in 2018, as the 10-year statute of limitations had expired. He was returned to the European Parliament in 2019.

Nica is married and has one child. Along with holding several prizes for his government and technical work, he has been a Knight of the Order of the Star of Romania since 2002. He is a philatelist.
