= Codruț Șereș =

Romanian politician (born 1969)

Ioan-Codruț Șereș (born 2 August 1969) is a Romanian engineer and politician. A member of the Conservative Party (PC), he was a member of the Romanian Senate for Maramureș County from 2004 to 2008. In the Călin Popescu-Tăriceanu cabinet, he was Minister of Economy and Commerce from 2004 to 2006.

== Biography ==
He was born in Zalău, and from 1988 to 1993 attended the Military Technical Academy in Bucharest, becoming a mechanical engineer and graduating first in his class. In 1999, he earned a Master of Business Administration through a programme organised by the University of Ottawa, HEC Montréal, and the Bucharest Academy of Economic Studies. From 1993 to 1999 he worked at the Defence Ministry, being assigned to the procurement department from 1996. From 1999 to 2004 he held management positions at three different firms, including as assistant director of Antena 1 (1999-2000) and as director of business development and strategy at Grivco (2001-2003), both owned by Dan Voiculescu, leader of the PC. In 2010, Șereș became president of Antena 1 and of Intact Media Group.

In 2001, Șereș joined the PUR (PC from 2005). In 2002, he became head of its department devoted to financing infrastructure projects for local PUR officeholders, and helped finance ten projects. In 2003 he became secretary general of the party, rising to vice president the following year, when he was also elected senator. In the Senate, he sat on the following committees: budget, finance, banking and capital markets (2006–2008); equal opportunity (2006); and privatisation and administering state assets (2004–2006). He was also vice president of the body during one session. Additionally, he served as Economy Minister from December 2004 to December 2006, resigning when the PC withdrew its support from the government. Around the same time, prosecutors from the Directorate for Investigating Organized Crime and Terrorism (DIICOT) opened an investigation into Șereș dealing with his relationship to the Bulgarian consultant Stamen Stanchev. They charged he had granted insider information or otherwise used his position to help Stanchev facilitate the privatisation of Electrica South Muntenia, of the Romanian government's 8% holding in Petrom, and of Romexterra Bank, as well as the planned privatisation of the Turceni Energy Complex, allegations that he denied. In 2009, a formal criminal case was opened against Șereș, who was indicted for treason and organised crime; five other persons are involved in the case, including Șereș' former ministerial colleague Zsolt Nagy. In 2013, he was convicted of the charges and sentenced to six years' imprisonment. In 2015, upon the exhaustion of his appeals, he was given a sentence of four years and eight months and incarcerated. Additionally, he was sentenced to four years' imprisonment in a case involving a corruption scandal at the state hydroelectric company, but appealed that ruling. The ruling was also upheld in early 2016 by the High Court.

In 1995, Șereș married Adina Zugravu, with whom he had a daughter in 1996 and whom he divorced in 2004. The catering firm of which she was director signed a number of no-bid contracts with the Economy Ministry while her former husband was in charge there. In 2006, he married Lorina Pop, the daughter of a Baia Mare businessman who later became a personal adviser to Șereș.

== See also ==
- List of corruption scandals in Romania
