= Tudor Chiuariu =

Romanian politician

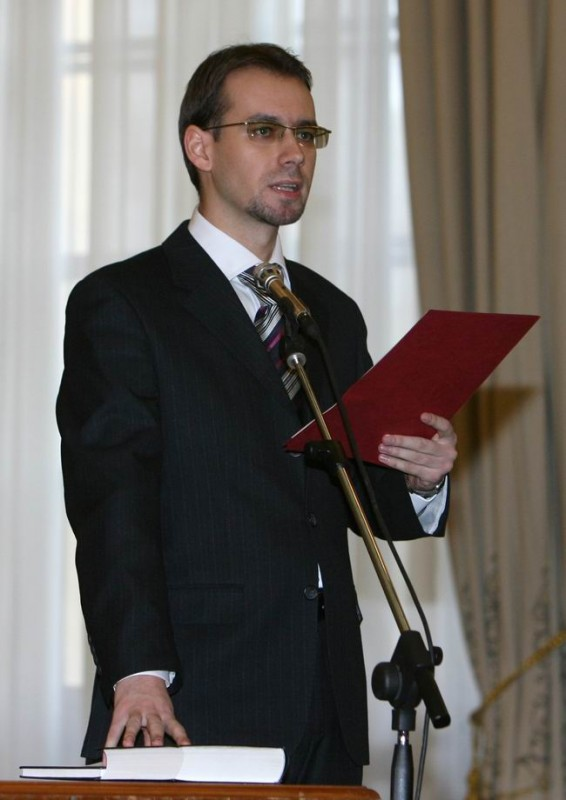

Minister of Justice
- In office 5 April 2007 – 10 December 2007
- President: Traian Băsescu
- Prime Minister: Călin Popescu-Tăriceanu
- Preceded by: Monica Macovei
- Succeeded by: Teodor Meleșcanu (ad interim)

Personal details
- Born: 13 June 1976 (age 50) Botoșani, Romania
- Party: National Liberal Party (1997–2015)
- Education: Alexandru Ioan Cuza University
- Occupation: lawyer

Tudor-Alexandru Chiuariu (born 13 July 1976) is a Romanian lawyer and politician. An independent, he served as Justice Minister in the Călin Popescu-Tăriceanu cabinet from April to December 2007. He represented Bacău County in the Romanian Chamber of Deputies from 2008 to 2012, and has represented Mehedinți County in the Romanian Senate since 2012.

== Biography ==
=== Origins, early career and political activity ===
Chiuariu was born in Botoșani to Carmen, a schoolteacher, and Alexandru, an economist, and has an older brother. The family moved to Suceava when Tudor was four; his father died three years later. His mother's parents taught in Cernăuți until 1940, when the area was occupied by Soviet troops, and they fled to near Rădăuți–a background Chiuariu cites as a motivation for measures he took while Justice Minister to simplify procedures for members of the Romanian diaspora to regain citizenship. His father was from Grămești, Suceava County, born into a family of small landowners (răzeși). From 1995 to 1999, Chiuariu attended the Law Faculty of the University of Iași.

Since 2000, he has worked as a lawyer, and is a member of the Iași bar. He took additional law courses at Bucharest's Alexandru Ioan Cuza Police Academy in 2002–2003, and since 2004 has been pursuing a doctorate in penal law at Iaşi. From 2000 to 2007, he taught law at the Petre Andrei University of Iași, where he has also been involved in research since 2000 and in editing its law review since 2006. In 2008 he lectured at the National Institute of Administration, and since that year he has been associate lecturer at the George Bacovia University of Bacău. He has written a number of journal articles in his field. Chiuariu is unmarried.

Chiuariu joined the National Liberal Party (PNL) in 1997. From that year until 2002, he was vice president of the Iași National Liberal Youth chapter, and in 2001-2002 he was a member of the permanent bureau of the Iaşi PNL chapter. From 2002 to 2005, he was vice president of the party's committee on justice and human rights, while from 2005 to 2007, he was vice president of its court of honour and arbitration. Since December 2007, elected as such immediately after his resignation as Justice Minister, he has been adjunct general secretary of the PNL, and became its spokesman in September 2008. This was an interim assignment for the parliamentary election; in January 2009, he was replaced on a permanent basis by Bogdan Olteanu. He held a number of positions within the Romanian Government between 2005 and 2008, when the PNL held the office of Prime Minister. From 2005 to 2007, he was a member in the council for coordinating implementation of the government's National Anti-corruption Strategy. Also, from January 2005 to April 2007, he was a state secretary at the prime minister's chancellery, as head of the government's anti-fraud department. From 2005 to 2006, he was president of the inter-ministerial commission meant to finalise a uniform system for paying civil servants' salaries.

=== As Justice Minister ===
In April 2007, Chiuariu was named Justice Minister following Tăriceanu's dismissal of Monica Macovei; the prime minister had been feuding for some time with her and with President Traian Băsescu, a strong Macovei supporter. Chiuariu's appointment was viewed by some with suspicion; multiple press reports identified him as a former lawyer of "local baron" Relu Fenechiu, although Chiuariu denied it. His term in office was marked by controversy almost from the start. He began by dismissing Macovei's state secretaries and advisers, among whom judges were well represented, replacing them for the most part with Iași lawyers, some of whom had no experience as judges. Less than a month after his investiture, the National Anticorruption Directorate (DNA) opened a case against him, alleging he had illegally consented to a governmental decision transferring an over-8,000 m^{2} (86,000 sq ft) parcel of public land on Calea Victoriei in central Bucharest into the private control of Poșta Română; a 300-room hotel was planned. The decision reputedly came in order to cover up ties forged illegally in 2005 between Poșta Română and a private real estate group. One civil servant had resigned rather than approve the transfer, which was then done by a Chiuariu aide; anonymous Justice Ministry employees charged that Tăriceanu had asked the same of Macovei but been turned down multiple times. In May, he asked the Supreme Council of Magistracy (CSM) to dismiss Doru Țuluș, a DNA prosecutor and head of the section investigating his own case; this stirred loud protests within the judicial system, including inside Chiuariu's ministry, and was rejected in October.

Also in May, he became embroiled in a conflict with DNA chief attorney Daniel Morar, who accused him of telephoning to request being informed about DNA activities before the press, and not to complete files on certain politicians at the time, when a presidential impeachment campaign was ongoing. Chiuariu denied the accusations, but the CSM later found he had applied "a certain amount of pressure" on DNA. At the end of June, Chiuariu sent a letter to the European Commission, then finalising a country report on Romania, asking it to eliminate laudatory passages regarding DNA's work; this too was rejected. At the same time, he accused his predecessor of acting against Romania's interests by sending negative reports to the Commission regarding the progress of judicial reform.

In October, he initiated an emergency decree effectively blocking criminal investigations into eight current and former ministers, including himself—the committee that then advised the president on the matter was replaced with another. Once the DNA case was initiated, Chiuariu became a lightning rod of criticism directed at the government by Băsescu. He pointed to Chiuariu's case while fighting impeachment in May, and called the minister "a shield, a protection for potential lawbreakers" and "an impudent young mafioso". In late November, Băsescu asked Tăriceanu to dismiss Chiuariu, but the latter said he had "other priorities". The following month, Băsescu publicly asked for his resignation, and was poised to suspend Chiuariu and approve a criminal investigation against him, following a ruling by the Constitutional Court allowing him to do so without recourse to any committee. The latter preemptively announced his resignation on December 10, denouncing the "masquerade" promoted by Băsescu, and the "institutions distorted by servility" subjecting him to a "ridiculous farce". The resignation was welcomed by Democratic Party president Emil Boc and Liberal Democratic Party vice president Valeriu Stoica, while Chiuariu's PNL colleague and party vice president Ludovic Orban said he had no reason to quit, and Greater Romania Party vice president Lucian Bolcaș praised his battle with DNA.

=== Subsequent career ===
From January to December 2008, he returned to the prime minister's chancellery as an adviser on matters of justice, home affairs and anti-fraud. He first appeared before DNA that February, insisting after an hour-long meeting with prosecutors on the political nature of the charges. That November, he was elected to the Chamber, where he serves on the justice, discipline and immunity committee, as well as on the joint committee on European affairs.

He has remained a critic of the president, for instance accusing him of responsibility for the "paralysis" in the country's judicial system in September 2009, after magistrates effectively went on strike to protest against the reduction of their salaries by 50–60%.

At the 2012 election, Chiuariu won a Senate seat. Upon taking office, he became president of that body's judiciary committee, as well as a member of the joint committee for revising the Constitution. In January 2014, together with former ministerial colleague Zsolt Nagy, he was convicted by the High Court of Cassation and Justice in a case involving a building on Calea Victoriei belonging to Poșta Română. The two were found to have conspired in the sale of the building to a private company at a price €3.6 million below market value. Chiuariu received a suspended sentence of 3½ years' imprisonment, prompting him to resign his chairmanship of the judiciary committee. In January 2015, he was removed from the PNL, formally because of non-payment of dues but unofficially because of his involvement in corruption cases; the following month, he also lost his seat on the judiciary committee.

== See also ==
- List of corruption scandals in Romania
- Romanian judicial reform
