= Romanian football league system =

System in Romanian club football

The Romanian football league system, also known as the football pyramid, refers to the system in Romanian club football that consists of several football leagues bound together hierarchically by promotion and relegation. The first three leagues are organized at a national level and consist of fully professional teams. Lower divisions are organized at county levels, with each county's football association controlling its respective leagues.

Reserve teams play in the same league system as their parent clubs.

== National leagues ==
The first three tiers are organized by nationwide federations: the first tier is overseen by the Romanian Professional Football League, while the second and third are run by the Romanian Football Federation.

A total of 114 teams play in the national leagues. Each of these clubs is fully professional and, in addition to playing in its respective league, has the right to compete in the Romanian Cup. They are also affiliated members of the Romanian Football Federation, and each has voting rights in the Federation's councils and elections, including in the election of the Federation president.

=== Superliga ===
The Liga I is the highest level in the Romanian football league system and is operated by the Romanian Professional Football League. 16 professional teams compete for the title of Romanian Football Champion in a round-robin home and away, with 30 season matches in the regular season. After the conclusion of the regular season, the top 6 teams compete in a playoff for the League Champion title and the remaining European football spots, while the last 10 teams contest a play-out to avoid the relegation spots. The bottom two sides are relegated directly, while the 13th and 14th places teams plays a two-legged playoff against the 3rd and 4th placed teams from Liga II. The playoff is a round-robin home and away tournament while the teams in the playout only play each other once and drawing of lots will decide home/away games.

After the regular seasons, team points are halved and rounded down. Half-points are taken into account and act as the first tiebreaker at the end of the playoff. For example, if two teams finish the regular season with 57 and 56 points respectively, they will both start in the playoff with 28 points. If the two teams finish the playoffs with an equal number of points, the first team will always be ranked above the second, regardless of any other tiebreakers such as goals scored or direct results between the teams in question.

=== Liga II ===
The Liga II is the second highest level in the Romanian football league system and is operated by the Romanian Football Federation. 20 teams compete in a round-robin home and away tournament. Just as Liga I, top six teams compete for the promotion and the first two teams get promoted directly while the 3rd and 4th places play a two-legged playoff against the 13th and 14th placed teams from Liga I. The rest of 14 teams are then divided into two groups and continue playing to avoid relegation. Bottom four teams are relegated directly while the 5th place in each of the two groups plays regional two-legged playoffs in order to keep their spot in the 2nd tier of Romanian football.

=== Liga III ===
The Liga III is the third highest level in the Romanian football league system and is operated by the Romanian Football Federation. 100 teams are divided in 10 regional groups of ten teams each, and compete in a round-robin home and away tournament consisting of 18 matches. After the regular season ends, the top four teams from each group will play for the top two spots that are going to take them in the regional playoffs for the promotion. The other six teams are battling to avoid relegation and the bottom two teams are directly relegated to the 4th league.

== County leagues ==
In contrast to the clubs from the national leagues, county league clubs are not directly affiliated to the Romanian Football Federation, but to the county's football association. While all national league clubs have the right of an individual vote, county football associations have a single vote.

Each of the 41 counties of Romania and Bucharest organize their own league system. The highest divisions in these system form the 42 series of Liga IV. Liga V is formed by each county's second tier. Eight counties organize a third tier. Each of these third-level leagues represent one of the following counties: Arad, Brăila, Dâmbovița, Ialomița, Mureș, Prahova and Teleorman, Harghita, and they collectively form the Liga VI.

Similarly to the top three leagues in the country, county league clubs finishing the season at or near the top of their division may be eligible for promotion to a higher division. The 42 county champions (the winners of each county's Liga IV) have a chance of advancing to the third tier. These 42 teams are drawn to play among themselves in 21 two-legged playoffs, with the winner of each playoff getting promoted to Liga III.

Each county sends a team to compete in the Romanian Cup. To designate this club, counties organize their own knockout tournaments.

== Current system ==
Level	League(s)/Division(s)
1	Liga I 16 clubs
	↓↑ 2-4 clubs
2	Liga II 22 clubs
	↓↑ 5 clubs
3	Liga III 96 clubs divided in 8 series of 12 teams each in 2025–26 normally 100 clubs divided in 10 series of 10 teams each
	↓↑ 21 clubs
4	Liga IV
5	Liga V
6	Liga VI

== Women's pyramid ==
A second-level league was first established in 2013. Before that there weren't enough women's football clubs for that and all played in the country's only league. Now, a three way league is under review and possible changes may be observed in the near future.

Level	League(s)/Division(s)		
1	Superliga; 8 clubs		
2	Liga 2 Series I 10 clubs		Liga 2 Series II; 10 clubs
3	Liga 3 Series I 6 clubs	Liga 3 Series II; 6 clubs	Liga 3 Series III; 6 clubs

== See also ==
- League system
- Cupa României
- Supercupa României
