= Victor Babiuc =

Romanian jurist and politician (1938–2023)

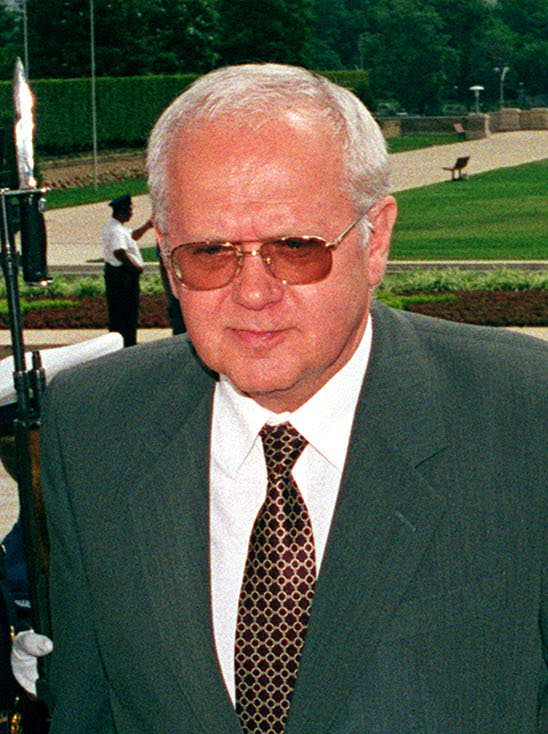
Babiuc in 1999

Victor Babiuc (Romanian pronunciation: [ˈviktor baˈbjuk]; 3 April 1938 – 25 February 2023) was a Romanian jurist and politician. A former member of the Democratic Party (PD), and of the National Liberal Party (PNL), he was a member of the Romanian Chamber of Deputies for Bucharest in 1990 and from 1992 to 1996, and for Brașov County from 1996 to 2004. In the Petre Roman cabinet, he was Minister of Justice from 1990 to 1991. In the Theodor Stolojan cabinet, he was Minister of the Interior from 1991 to 1992. In the Victor Ciorbea, Radu Vasile and Mugur Isărescu cabinets, he was Minister of National Defense from 1996 to 2000.

== Biography ==
=== Legal career and entry into politics ===
Born in Răchiți, Botoșani County, into a family of teachers, he graduated from the Law Faculty of the University of Bucharest in 1958, earning his doctorate there in 1979. From 1958 to 1963, Babiuc was a consulting arbitrator at the Brașov Arbitration Court. From 1963 to 1965 and from 1966 to 1968, he was legal adviser at a Brașov tractor factory. In the interim, he was a judge at the city's courthouse. From 1968 to 1971, he was a consulting and then counselling arbitrator at the central arbitration court in Bucharest. From 1971 to 1977, he was legal adviser at the Foreign Trade Ministry, rising to chief legal adviser during that period. From 1977 to 1990, he was a research associate at the Romanian Academy's Institute of World Economy. From 1980 to 1987, he was associate professor at the Ștefan Gheorghiu Academy and the Bucharest Academy of Economic Studies. From 1985 to 1989, he was a temporary adviser to the Legislative Council. He is the author of over 150 published works. Babiuc was never a member of the ruling Romanian Communist Party.

Entering politics after the Romanian Revolution of December 1989, from March to June 1990, he was an expert to the constitutional committee of the Provisional National Unity Council, the country's temporary legislative body. Elected to the Chamber in May as a National Salvation Front member, he served there from mid-June until the end of July, when he resigned. This was followed over the next two years by two ministerial stints: Justice under Prime Minister Petre Roman and Interior under PM Theodor Stolojan. It was during his time at the Interior Ministry that debates about its demilitarisation began. Meanwhile, in 1992 he became university professor, teaching international commercial law, and the following year he became president of the commercial arbitration court within the Defense Ministry. Joining the new Democratic Party, he returned to the Chamber in 1992, where he was on the defense, public order and national security committee (1992), and president of the committee for investigating abuses, corruption and for petitions (1992–1996). In 1995 he rose to vice president of the PD.

=== As Defense Minister and subsequently ===
Again elected in 1996, he was on the following committees: investigating abuses, corruption and petitions (1996–2000); culture, art and mass media (1998); European integration (1998–2000); and defense, public order and national security (2000). During this period, the Romanian Democratic Convention governed Romania, and he was Defense Minister in three successive cabinets, from December 1996 to March 2000 (with a hiatus in February–April 1998), and was also interim Reform Minister in December 1998. Babiuc, who had no military experience or expertise, managed the Romanian Army as part of his political intrigues, granting promotions to lower-ranking officers on political criteria. Two crises marked his tenure as Defense Minister. The first came at the beginning of 1999, when the third Mineriad saw Jiu Valley miners march toward Bucharest. Reversing a differentiation of police and military roles that had begun to take shape prior to 1996, Babiuc announced that the army was available to intervene domestically, leading to serious strain between him and the officer corps. The second occurred shortly thereafter, during the NATO bombing of Yugoslavia. Despite widespread domestic criticism, Parliament approved NATO's demand for unlimited use of Romanian airspace, with Babiuc asserting Romania's determination "to be alongside and together with NATO".

The period also coincided with a renewed effort to bring to justice those who had fired on unarmed civilians during the Revolution. On the one hand, Babiuc encouraged the 1997 opening of army files relating to the event, saying it would free them from the stigma of suspicion and that investigations should proceed unhampered. On the other hand, following the 1999 conviction of Generals Victor Stănculescu and Mihai Chițac for ordering shooting while repressing the uprising in Timișoara, he stressed that the two personally "did not harm anybody" and "played a decisive role" in turning the army to the side of the Revolution. This was characteristic of the PD's attempts to find extenuating circumstances and prevent justice from taking its course.

When he left the PD in early 2000, he also resigned from his ministerial post, and sat in the Chamber as an independent until the end of the year. Babiuc was elected to a final term in 2000. He sat as a PNL member until April 2002, then as an independent until January 2003, when he returned to the PD. He was on the human rights, religious affairs, and national minorities committee. In 2008, prosecutors from the National Anticorruption Directorate opened a criminal case against Babiuc, charging him with bribery and abuse of office for a 1999 sale of land in Pipera at well below the market rate from the Defense Ministry to businessman Gigi Becali. In May 2013, the High Court of Cassation and Justice convicted Babiuc, Becali, and Dumitru Cioflină in the case, with Babiuc sentenced to two years' imprisonment at the maximum-security Rahova Prison. Following a court ruling, he was freed in February 2014.

Babiuc was married and had one child. Having spent his final years outside of public life, he died in February 2023, aged 84.

== See also ==
- List of corruption scandals in Romania
