= Dumitru Dragomir =

Romanian politician (born 1946)

Personal information
- Full name: Dumitru Dragomir
- Date of birth: 30 May 1946 (age 80)
- Place of birth: Bălcești, Vâlcea County, Romania

Youth career
- 1962–1964: Nitramonia Făgăraș
- 1965–1967: Universitatea Craiova

Senior career*
Years	Team	Apps	(Gls)
1967–1971	Chimia Râmnicu Vâlcea		
- * Club domestic league appearances and goals

Dumitru "Mitică" Dragomir (born 30 May 1946) is a former president of the Romanian Professional Football League from 1996 until 2014. Before that, he served as the president of Chimia Râmnicu Vâlcea, Olt Scorniceşti, FCM Braşov, and Victoria București.

He also sat in the Romanian Chamber of Deputies from 2000 to 2008, representing Vâlcea County and winning election twice, more specifically in 2000 and in 2004. He was a member of the Greater Romania Party (PRM) for most of that period, but resigned from the party in September 2008 and sat as an independent MP for the remainder of his second term.

On 23 June 2016, Dragomir was sentenced to 7 years' imprisonment for tax evasion, embezzlement, and money laundering. The sentence was not final. He was acquitted of all charges by the Bucharest Court of Appeals in November 2018, the decision being final.

== See also ==
- List of corruption scandals in Romania
