= Anti-Corruption General Directorate =

Romanian law enforcement agency

Anti-Corruption General Directorate Direcția Generală Anticorupție
- Abbreviation: DGA
- Motto: Integrity for credibility

Agency overview
- Formed: 2005

Jurisdictional structure
- National agency (Operations jurisdiction): Romania
- Operations jurisdiction: Romania
- Legal jurisdiction: As per operations jurisdiction

Operational structure
- Headquarters: Bucharest
- Agency executive: Police Quaestor Jănică Arion Ţigănaşu, Ph.D., General Director
- Parent agency: Ministry of Internal Affairs

Website
- www.mai-dga.ro

Direcția Generală Anticorupție (Anti-Corruption General Directorate, DGA) is an agency subordinated to the Romanian Ministry of Internal Affairs, tasked with preventing and investigating the corruption offenses, the criminal acts and misconduct among the personnel of the Ministry. The Anti-Corruption General Directorate was set up to deal strictly with corruption within the ministry.

== History ==
The Anti-Corruption General Directorate was established by the Law 161/2005 as the specialized structure for preventing of and fighting against corruption within the Ministry of Internal Affairs (MAI).

The creation of the Anti-Corruption General Directorate was supported by the European Union, with the assistance of experts from Spain and the United Kingdom.

== Mission ==
DGA's mission is focused on preventing of and fighting against corruption offenses conducted by the Ministry of Internal Affairs personnel. Moreover, the Anti-Corruption General Directorate cooperates with public and private organizations with responsibilities in preventing and fighting corruption.

During investigations, the DGA staff are legally required to observe the principles of objectivity, confidentiality and impartiality, as well as the human rights and civic freedoms.

Another objective of the Anti-Corruption General Directorate is anticipating and identifying risk factors and system vulnerabilities in regard to corruption-related offenses.

== Duties ==
The Anti-corruption General Directorate has the duty to:

- take the specific operative measures in order to prevent, provide information about and fight against corruption-related offenses perpetrated by the MAI personnel;
- receive citizens' complaints/petitions on the corruption offenses allegedly perpetrated by the MAI personnel;
- conduct specific public relations activities;
- perform judicial police activities, according to law;
- test the professional integrity of the MAI personnel;
- establish international collaboration relations, according to the interests of the Ministry of Internal Affairs;
- administrate data concerning acts and offenses of internal corruption;
- analyze the evolution of the corruption offenses of the MAI personnel and accordingly inform the Minister of Interior or other competent bodies, according to the law.

== See also ==
- National Anticorruption Directorate
