= Relu Fenechiu =

Romanian businessman and former politician (born 1965)

- Born: July 3, 1965 (age 60); Dărmănești, Bacău County, Romania
- Occupation(s): Businessman and former politician

Relu Fenechiu (born July 3, 1965) is a Romanian businessman and former politician. A former member of the National Liberal Party (PNL), he was a member of the Romanian Chamber of Deputies for Iași County from 2004 to 2014. In the Victor Ponta cabinet, he served as Transport Minister from 2012 to 2013. Convicted of corruption in 2013, he went to prison the following year and was released in 2017.

== Biography ==
He was born in Dărmănești, Bacău County, attending high school in Comănești. In 1990, he graduated from the Mechanics Faculty of the Gheorghe Asachi Technical University of Iași, specialising in the technology of building motor vehicles. He holds a 2006 degree from the Carol I National Defence University and a 2007 master's degree in marketing from the Romanian-American University. In 2008, he took master's courses in Economics and Environmental Management at the Ecological University of Bucharest. From 1990 to 2004, he directed Fene Grup S.A., a Iaşi-based group of construction firms.

Fenechiu joined the Iași PNL chapter in 1996, serving as its vice president from 1998 to 2000. He was vice president of the PNL's Iași County chapter from 2001 to 2004, and was its president from that time until 2014. In 2001, he joined the party's delegation of national representatives, and became president of its committee on regional policy, land management and transport in 2002. Since 2007, he has sat on the PNL's central political bureau, responsible for its specialty committees. Fenechiu's first elected position was as an Iași County councillor, from 2000 to 2004. In 2004, he was elected to the Chamber, being re-elected in 2008. During his first parliamentary term, he was deputy leader of the PNL group from December 2004 to September 2005, followed by a stint as president of the committee on public administration, land management and ecological balance. Additionally, from May 2007, he was on the joint committee for European affairs. In 2009, he rejoined the public administration committee, having been on the culture, arts and mass media committee from the start of his second term. Since that term began, he has been president of the information technology and communications committee. During both terms, he was part of the Romanian Parliament's delegation to the Parliamentary Assembly of the Council of Europe. Fenechiu was elected to yet another term in 2012, being assigned to the industry committee, and was named Minister of Transport in the Victor Ponta cabinet. Additionally, from September 2013 to the following February, he headed the Chamber's European affairs committee.

Fenechiu has been referred to as a "local baron", and wielded some influence within the PNL. For instance, he was reportedly behind the appointment of Cristian Adomniței, Tudor Chiuariu and Cristian David to Călin Popescu-Tăriceanu's second cabinet in 2007. His wealth has also drawn notice: in 2008, his holdings included six pieces of land, five houses, four cars, jewellery worth €80,000 and some €300,000 in bank accounts—with assets at around €7 million, he was nearly among the Capital Top 300 wealthiest men in Romania that year. Some of his dealings have raised questions, as exemplified by the allegations made against him in 2008 by prosecutors from the National Anticorruption Directorate (DNA), who charged that his firms sold transformers in an advanced state of degradation to an electrical company at prices for brand-new ones, turning a €2 million profit for him. These charges made their way into a court indictment issued in 2012, when he and his brother were charged by the DNA with 46 corruption-related offenses. In 2013, he was convicted and received a five-year prison sentence, prompting his resignation as minister but not from the Chamber. He vowed to appeal, as did prosecutors, who considered the sentence too light. The sentence was upheld early the following year; the same day, he surrendered to police, resigning from the PNL and from the Chamber. He was granted a conditional release in August 2017, having served three and a half years in prison.

While the PNL was in office from 2004 to 2008, there was suspicion that he benefited from preferential state contracts, but he downplayed the size of such dealings when asked about the matter. He is a strong critic of President Traian Băsescu, for instance attacking his association with FC Steaua București owner Gigi Becali in 2006, and three years later dismissing the proposed cabinet of Lucian Croitoru as a mere ploy for Băsescu's re-election campaign.

He and his ex-wife Liliana, a former model to whom he was married from 1993 to February 2006, have a son. The following October, he married folk music singer Mariana Ivan, of Abrud, at a castle in Austria.

== See also ==
- List of corruption scandals in Romania
