= Liviu Dragnea =

Romanian engineer and politician (born 1962)

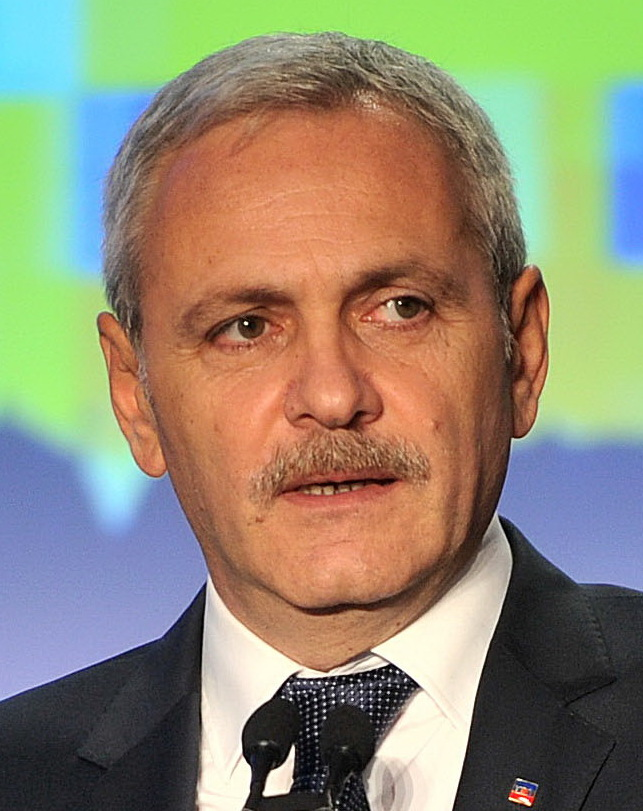
- Dragnea in 2014

President of the Chamber of Deputies
- In office 21 December 2016 – 27 May 2019
- Preceded by: Florin Iordache (interim)
- Succeeded by: Marcel Ciolacu

President of the Social Democratic Party
- In office 12 October 2015 – 27 May 2019; Acting: 22 July 2015 – 12 October 2015
- Preceded by: Rovana Plumb (acting)
- Succeeded by: Viorica Dăncilă (acting)

Deputy Prime Minister of Romania
- In office 21 December 2012 – 17 December 2014
- President: Traian Băsescu
- Prime Minister: Victor Ponta
- Preceded by: Florin Georgescu
- Succeeded by: Daniel Chițoiu

Minister of Regional Development and Administration
- In office 21 December 2012 – 15 May 2015
- Prime Minister: Victor Ponta
- Preceded by: Eduard Hellvig
- Succeeded by: Sevil Shhaideh

Minister of Administration and Interior
- In office 20 January 2009 – 2 February 2009
- Prime Minister: Emil Boc
- Preceded by: Dan Nica (interim)
- Succeeded by: Dan Nica

Member of the Chamber of Deputies
- In office 20 December 2012 – 29 May 2019

Personal details
- Born: Liviu Nicolae Dragnea; 28 October 1962 (age 63) Gratia, Teleorman, Romania
- Party: Sovereign Romania Movement Party (since 2023)
- Other political affiliations: Democratic Party (1996–2000); Social Democratic Party (2000–2019); Alliance for the Homeland (2021-2022)
- Spouse: Bombonica Prodana (div. 2015)
- Domestic partner: Irina Alexandra Tănase
- Education: Carol I National Defence University; Ecological University of Bucharest; Polytechnic Institute of Bucharest
- Profession: Engineer
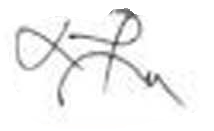
- Signature

Liviu Nicolae Dragnea (Note: Romanian pronunciation: [ˈlivju nikoˈla.e ˈdraɡne̯a]) (born 28 October 1962) is a Romanian engineer and former politician. Starting his career in the Democratic Party (PD), he joined the Social Democratic Party (PSD), eventually becoming its leader. After holding several positions as Minister, he resigned from the cabinet in May 2015, following a conviction in a case involving electoral fraud, for which he received a two-year suspended sentence in April 2016.

In December 2016, following that year's legislative election, he became President of the Chamber of Deputies of Romania, but was rumoured by the press to be the de facto Prime Minister of Romania. During this period, Romania experienced a strong economic growth, but his rule was marked by corruption scandals and accusations of authoritarian tendencies, as well as a shift towards illiberalism, which led to the biggest protests in Romania's post-revolutionary history. In May 2019, he was sent to prison for three and a half years, convicted of arranging payment for two party members employed in fake jobs and paid by a state agency. Simultaneously, his term in the Chamber drew to a close. In July 2021, the prison sentence was lifted, ending his jail time 1 year and 4 months earlier.

== Biography ==
=== Early life and education ===
Dragnea was born in Gratia, Teleorman County, and after completing secondary studies at Unirea Mathematics-Physics High School in Turnu Măgurele in 1981, enrolled at the Polytechnic Institute of Bucharest. He graduated from the Transport faculty in 1987. He also studied at the Public Administration School of the Italian Ministry of the Interior (1997), the Faculty of Management and Public Administration at the Ecological University of Bucharest (2003) and the Carol I National Defence University (2004).

=== Local government career ===
Dragnea's political career began in 1996, when he was elected a city councilor in Turnu Măgurele.

From 1996 to 2000, while Dragnea was a member of the PD, he served as prefect of Teleorman County; he then switched to the PSD, which won the 2000 election. In 2000, he became president of the Teleorman County Council, being re-elected in 2004, 2008 and 2012. He is a member of the PSD's permanent national bureau and of the party's Teleorman County chapter. In 2006, he was elected party vice president for state reform and decentralisation (suspending himself from the position after the failure of that year's presidential impeachment referendum), and he led the PSD's campaign at the 2007 European Parliament election. Following the 2008 parliamentary election, for which he helped run the campaign, he was named coordinator of PSD ministers in the Boc cabinet, charged with maintaining links between ministers and the party leadership.

==== Legal and other controversies ====
Beginning in the 2000s, Dragnea was characterised as a "local baron" with a powerful influence within the PSD. For instance, in 2006, he was one of the individuals who forced Adrian Năstase to resign as party head and Chamber of Deputies president. Moreover, his wealth and business dealings have drawn attention: as of late 2008, he had eight landholdings (including in Azuga and Năvodari), an apartment, two residences and a vacation house, a hotel, an inn, and two commercial venues in Turnu Măgurele. Fear of losing control over this Teleorman County "empire" was cited as yet another possible motive for his resignation.

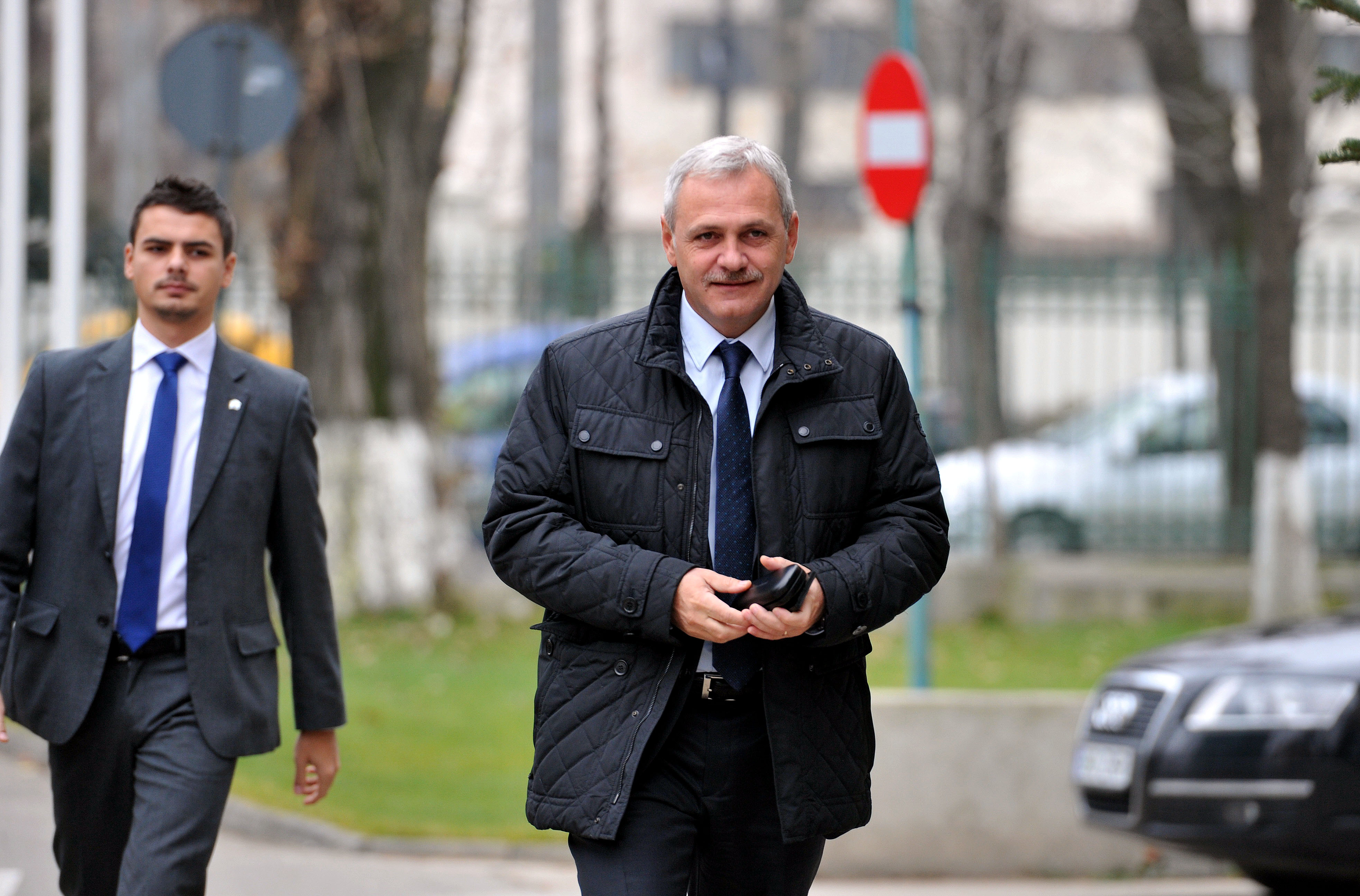
Dragnea in 2014

He was accused by the National Anticorruption Directorate (DNA) of falsifying documents while attempting to access European Union (EU) funds for building a new border checkpoint with Bulgaria, but charges were later dropped without much explanation. Controversy arose too during his first term as county council president. In 2001, the council privatised a state construction firm at a very low price. Dragnea's personal driver won it at auction, and Dragnea awarded the firm many public contracts for road construction, some of these being considered overvalued. In 2004, he was accused by high-ranking PD members of having bought a hotel for 800 million lei (some $27,000) and reselling it for 40 billion lei (around $1.3 million) to his driver's firm, before regaining the property. Also that year, he was blamed for wasting public money by having the council sponsor a basketball club.

=== As cabinet minister ===
In January 2009, following the resignation of Gabriel Oprea, Dragnea was named Interior Minister. He announced his priorities as being the safety of children in school, the safety of citizens on the street, decentralisation and administrative reform. Twelve days later, he resigned, citing a lack of resources and funds to implement his plans. There was speculation that he was forced out by party president Mircea Geoană and Sector 5 Mayor Marian Vanghelie for refusing to name an individual suggested by the latter as a secretary of state at the ministry. Also, his brief tenure was rocked by an armed robbery in Braşov and an arms theft from a depot in Ciorogârla. He remained county council president at the time and continued to be a vehement critic of the PSD—PDL alliance (which he opposed from the start), referring to Transport Minister Radu Berceanu as a "nitwit" and to Prime Minister Boc as a "whippersnapper". He became secretary general of the PSD in July 2009.

At the December 2012 parliamentary election, Dragnea won a seat for Teleorman County with 71.5% of the vote. Later that month, he resigned his position in the county council, and was named Regional Development Minister as well as one of three deputy premiers to Prime Minister Victor Ponta. Simultaneously, he left the county council leadership. In early 2013, he left the party secretary general position, soon becoming executive president. Following a cabinet reshuffle in December 2014, he lost the deputy premiership but retained the Regional Development portfolio.

=== Social Democratic leadership ===
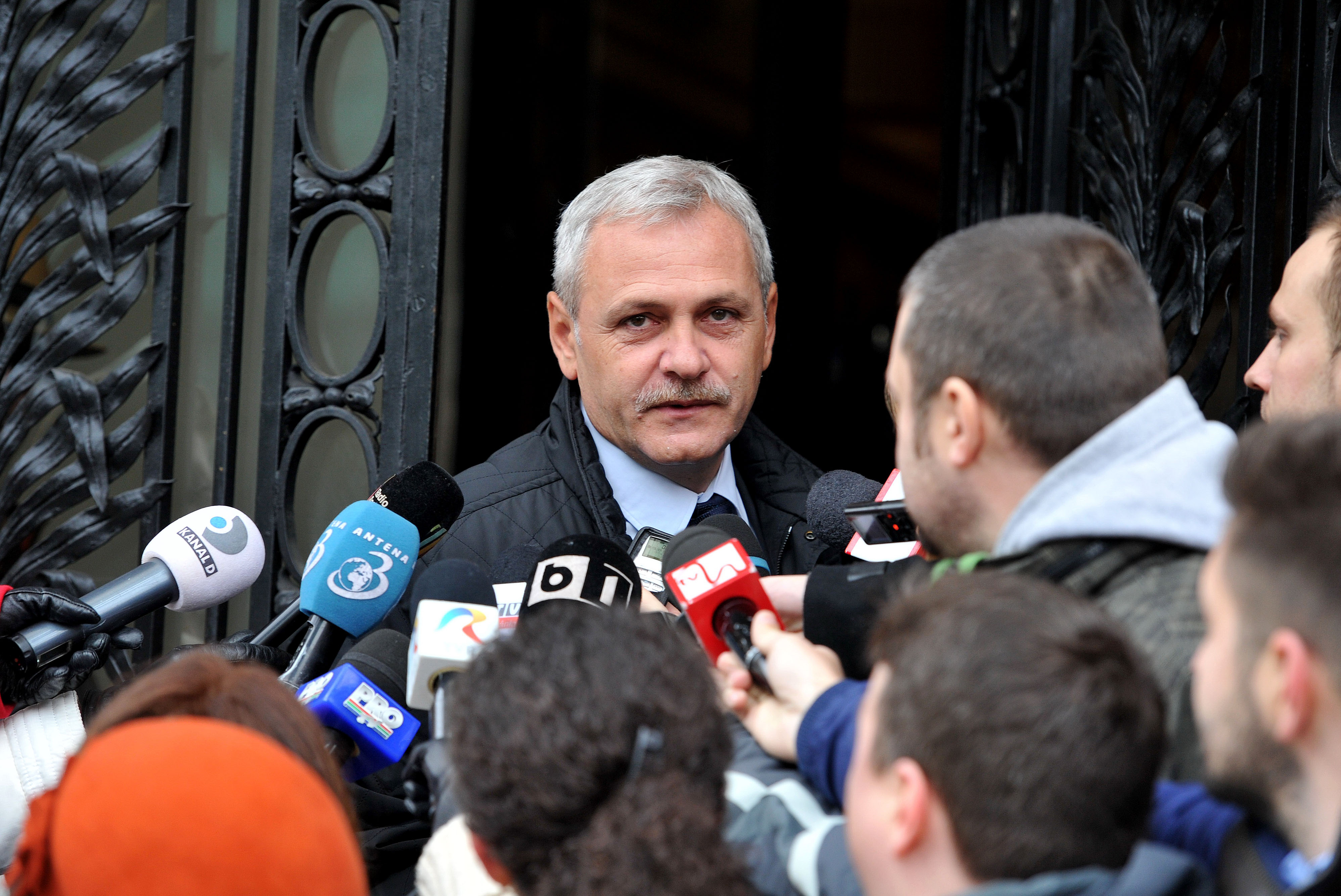
Dragnea in June 2014

In July 2015, following Ponta's resignation as PSD president, Dragnea ran to replace him on an interim basis, and defeated Rovana Plumb on a 65–18 margin. In October, he was the sole candidate to run for party leader in a ballot open to all party members; 97% voted in his favor.

In the December 2016 parliamentary election, Dragnea retained his own seat in the Chamber while leading the PSD to victory. He was subsequently elected Chamber President.

Through Elliott Broidy's efforts, Dragnea and another Romanian politician met President Donald Trump at the Trump International Hotel in Washington during inauguration week in January 2017 after which Dragnea, who wanted a close relationship between Romania and the United States, posted on his Facebook page that President Trump said "We will make it happen! Romania is important for us!" Broidy was attempting to gain contracts between his Virginia-based private security company Circinus and the Romanian government.

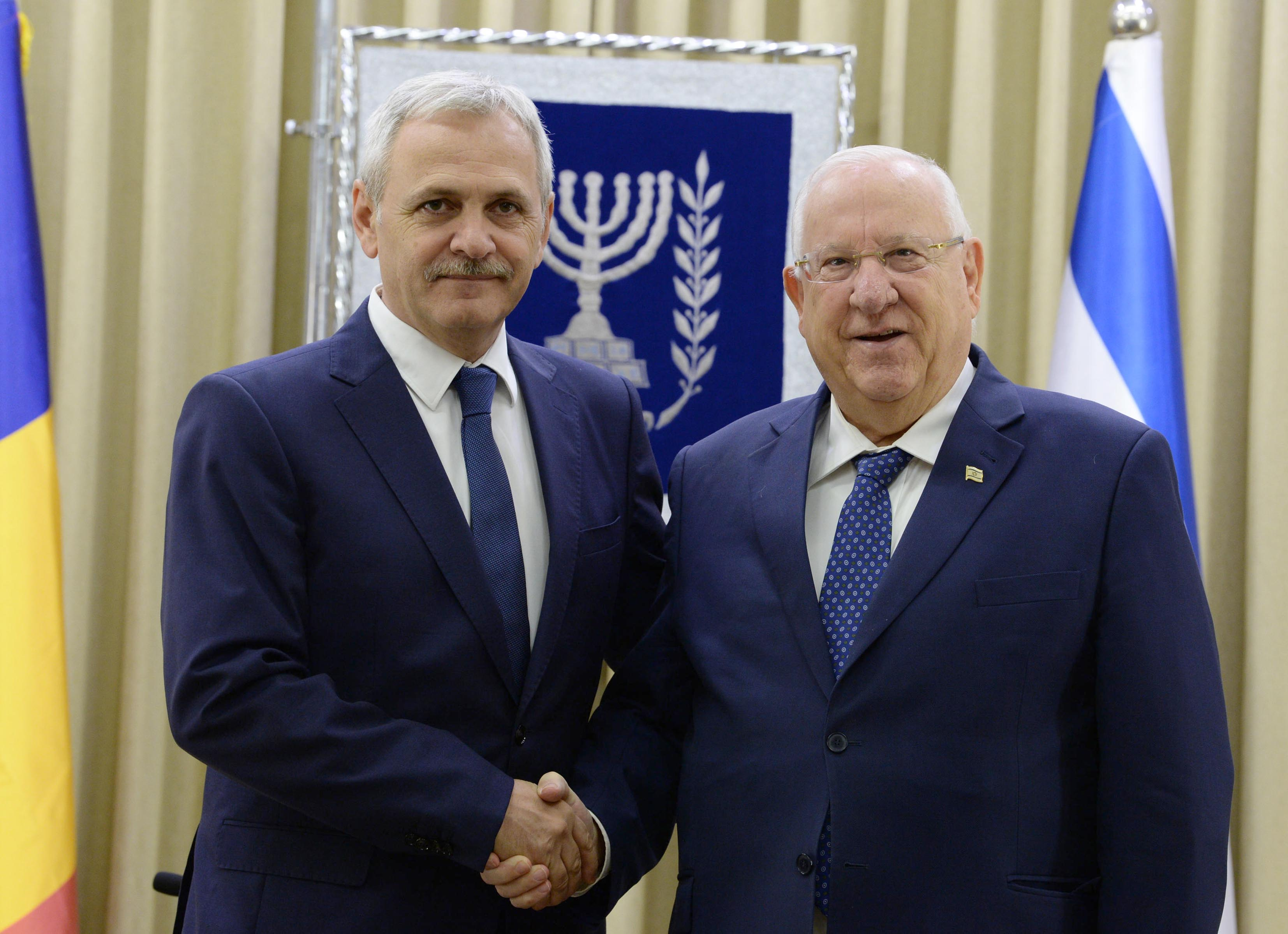
Dragnea with Israeli President Reuven Rivlin

=== Convictions for electoral fraud ===
In May 2015, he was convicted of orchestrating electoral fraud during the 2012 presidential impeachment referendum and given a one-year suspended sentence. As a result, he resigned as Regional Development Minister.

In April 2016, the High Court of Cassation and Justice pronounced a final verdict in the electoral fraud case, doubling Dragnea's initial sentence to two years, suspended.

=== EU fraud case and investigation in Brazil ===
In November 2017, the DNA opened a third case against Dragnea, based on information compiled by the European Anti-Fraud Office. He is alleged to have formed part of a criminal conspiracy, formed in 2001 involving, the fraudulent redirection of EU funds worth €20 million.

In March 2018, RISE Project and Folha de São Paulo revealed that Liviu Dragnea would have been investigated in Brazil for money laundering. According to Federal Prosecutor Carlos Wagner Barbosa Guimarães, Dragnea would have used intertwines – "oranges" – to wash money and acquire property on the beach of Cumbuco, 30 kilometers from Fortaleza, the capital of Ceará. In Portuguese, laranja (orange) is the term that designates interlopers, people who are brought forward by corrupt or criminal politicians to hide their involvement in various business. Dragnea said the information on the Brazilian investigation is false.

=== Convictions for incitement to abuse of office ===
In December 2016, he and his former wife were indicted for abuse of public office and forgery allegedly committed during his time as Teleorman County Council president.

Dragnea was convicted on 21 June 2018 by the High Court of Cassation and Justice for incitement to abuse of office as chairman of the Teleorman County Council. He has received a prison sentence of 3 years and 6 months. On 27 May 2019 the sentence was upheld on appeal by the High Court of Cassation and Justice, and Dragnea was jailed in Rahova Prison on the same day.

On 15 July 2021, 2 years and 2 months later, the Giurgiu Court admitted Dragnea's request for conditional release from prison, thus ending jail time earlier by 1 year and 4 months. Before this admission, Dragnea had also won several trials with the Rahova Prison for the violation of multiple rights throughout the jail time, most notably the right to work (lifted by the prison leadership immediately after his 2020 online interview to TV channel Realitatea Plus) and to healthcare. The interdictions set by the High Court of Cassation and Justice forbid Dragnea from holding any public position involving the exercise of state authority and from being a candidate for a public elective position for another 3 years after the release (until 2024).

In 2021, Dragnea announced the creation of the Alliance for the Homeland party. While he is not a member of the party (because of the legal restrictions), he was considered its de facto ruler. In May 2022, Dragnea received the "Iuliu Maniu Medal" from PNȚCD president Aurelian Pavelescu, the latter saying that a possible alliance between the two parties for the next Romanian legislative election might be possible. However, in September 2022, the Alliance for the Homeland distanced itself from Dragnea.

In early 2023, Dragnea started uploading on YouTube cooking tutorial videos, presented by himself.

In May 2023, Dragnea announced that he backs a new party, headed by Carmen Dan: the Sovereign Romania Movement Party.

== Personal life ==
Dragnea and his wife Bombonica had two children prior to their divorce in 2015.

Since May 2016, Dragnea is engaged to Irina Alexandra Tănase, his former secretary, who is 30 years younger than him.

Dragnea is a member of the Romanian Orthodox Church.

== See also ==
- List of corruption scandals in Romania

== Notes ==
Political offices
Preceded by Gabriel Oprea	Minister of Administration and Interior; 2009	Succeeded by Dan Nica
Preceded by Eduard Hellvig	Minister of Regional Development and Administration; 2012–2015	Succeeded by Sevil Shhaideh
Preceded by Florin Iordache	President of the Chamber of Deputies; 2016–2019	Succeeded by Marcel Ciolacu
Party political offices
Preceded by Valeriu Zgonea; Acting	Secretary-General of the Social Democratic Party; 2009–2013	Succeeded by Andrei Dolineaschi
Preceded by Victor Ponta	President of the Social Democratic Party; 2015–2019	Succeeded by Viorica Dăncilă; Acting
