= Cătălin Voicu =

Romanian politician

Member of the Parliament of Romania
- In office 2004–2008
- In office 2008–2012

Personal details
- Born: March 21, 1965 (age 61) Romania
- Party: Social Democratic Party
- Occupation: Politician • Adviser

Cătălin Voicu (born 21 March 1965) is a Romanian politician, member of the Social Democratic Party, and member of Parliament of Romania in 2004–2008 and 2008–2012 legislature. Voicu was adviser of the President of Romania, Ion Iliescu, from 2000 until 2004.

== Controversies ==
On 10 December 2009, Voicu was invited for questioning by the National Anticorruption Directorate. He was later arrested and investigated for corruption and trafficking in influence. The main accusations were based on phone calls between him and various other individuals. After almost 16 months of preventive detention, on 19 July 2010, he was released from jail. In June 2012 he was sentenced to five years in a traffic of influence case. The prosecutors considered that he had built up "a criminal network based on bribery, intimidation, and extortion". On 22 April 2013 he was convicted to 7 years in prison. After serving time at the Găești Penitenciary, he was eliberated in February 2016 for writing books in jail.

== See also ==
- List of corruption scandals in Romania
