= Eduard Hellvig =

Romanian political scientist, journalist and politician

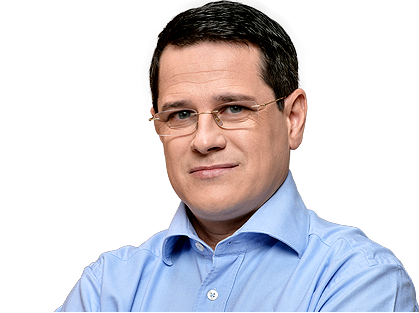

Director of the Romanian Intelligence Service
- In office 2 March 2015 – 3 July 2023
- Preceded by: Florian Coldea (interim)

Member of the European Parliament for Romania
- In office 4 September 2013 – 1 March 2015
- In office 1 January 2007 – 25 November 2007

Minister of Regional Development and Tourism
- In office 7 May 2012 – 19 December 2012
- Prime Minister: Victor Ponta
- Preceded by: Cristian Predescu
- Succeeded by: Liviu Dragnea

Personal details
- Born: October 27, 1974 (age 51) Zalău, Sălaj County, Socialist Republic of Romania
- Party: Conservative Party (2003–2008); National Liberal Party (2008–2015, 2024-present)
- Other political affiliations: Social Liberal Union (USL)
- Spouse: Andreea Hellvig
- Children: 1
- Education: Babeș-Bolyai University (B.A.); National University of Political Studies and Public Administration (Ph.D.)
- Awards: Order of the Star of Romania, Officer rank

Eduard Raul Hellvig (born 27 October 1974) is a Romanian political scientist, journalist and politician who served as director of the Romanian Intelligence Service (SRI) from 2015 to 2023. A former member of the National Liberal Party (PNL) and previously of the Conservative Party (PC), he represented Bihor County in the Romanian Chamber of Deputies from 2004 to 2008, and sat for Ilfov County from 2012 to 2013. In the Victor Ponta cabinet, he was Minister of Regional Development and Tourism in 2012. In 2007, he was a Member of the European Parliament (MEP) for Romania, a position he once again took up in 2013, and which he left upon becoming SRI director.

== Biography ==
Born in Zalău, he attended Babeș-Bolyai University from 1993 to 1997, graduating with a degree in political science. In 2009, he received a doctorate in the same field from the National School of Political Science and Public Administration. From 1997 to 1998, he worked as a stockbroker; during that time, he was also present on the editorial staff for Stelian Tănase's Sfera Politicii magazine. In 1999–2000, during the Romanian Democratic Convention cabinet, he worked as a Chief of Staff for Interior Minister Constantin Dudu Ionescu. In 2000, he was on the Presidential campaign team of that cabinet's final prime minister, Mugur Isărescu. From 2001 to 2003 he headed a polling firm, and in 2004 he became director of Sintezis, an information technology company. In 2005, together with Zsolt Szilágyi and others, Hellvig was nominated as a member of Generația Așteptată ("The Awaited Generation"), a project which took inspiration from a campaign in the newspaper Cotidianul, and which sought to evidence and nominate the valuable young contributors to Romanian society.

Hellvig entered the Romanian Humanist Party (PUR), as the PC was then called, in 2003, and served as interim head of its Bihor County chapter from 2004 to 2005. Elected to the Chamber in 2004, he served, from 2005 to 2008, on its defense committee. He crossed to the PNL in September 2008, and served as its secretary general from 2011 to 2014. From January to November 2007, he was a Member of the European Parliament. At the 2008 election, he ran for re-election to the Chamber, but was defeated. Subsequently, he became a close ally of PNL leader Crin Antonescu.

In May 2012, Hellvig was named Regional Development and Tourism Minister in the new Ponta cabinet, serving until December. Elected to a new term in the Chamber at that point, he initially sat on the foreign affairs committee, until February 2013, when he switched to the European affairs committee. He became one of the Chamber's vice presidents in December 2012. In November 2012, investigators from the National Integrity Agency (ANI) charged that for several months, from the time he took ministerial office until he left Sintezis that September, he was, legally, in a conflict of interest. Hellvig denied the charges, which were upheld the following April by the Bucharest Court of Appeal, prompting him to state he would continue to fight for vindication. In December 2014, the High Court of Cassation and Justice decided in Hellvig's favor, ruling that he had not been in a conflict of interest and rejecting the ANI's claims.

In September 2013, when two vacancies opened in the PNL's delegation to the European Parliament, Hellvig filled one of the openings after resigning from the Chamber. As MEP, he sits on the Internal Market Committee. He won a full term as MEP at the May 2014 European Parliament election. In February 2015, President Klaus Iohannis nominated him to be director of the Romanian Intelligence Service; the following month, a joint session of Parliament confirmed him to the post on a 498–15 vote. A vice president of the PNL at the time, he subsequently resigned from the party, as required, and also from the European Parliament. He resigned as SRI director in July 2023, citing a desire to avoid “petrification” in office. He rejoined the PNL in November 2024, in the wake of the presidential election, where the party’s candidate Nicolae Ciucă fared poorly.

In 2019 he was awarded the Order of the Star of Romania, Officer rank.

He and his wife Andreea (née Dumitraș) have a daughter.
