= Hidroelectrica =

Hidroelectrica S.A.
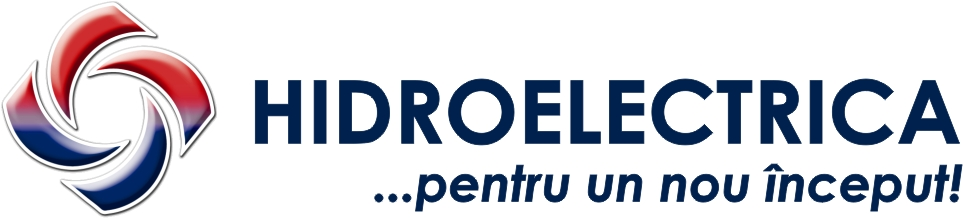
- Company type: Public
- Traded as: BVB: H2O
- Industry: Electric utility
- Predecessor: CONEL (1998 - 2000)
- Founded: 2000
- Headquarters: Bucharest, Romania
- Key people: Bogdan Nicolae Badea, Chairman of the Board
- Revenue: 914,000,000 euro (2018)
- Net income: RON 4.5 Billion (2022)
- Number of employees: 4,621 (2022)
- Parent: Government of Romania (80.056%)
- Website: www.hidroelectrica.ro

Hidroelectrica is a leader in electricity production and the main provider of technological services required in the National Energy System in Romania.

The company is currently managed in a dual system, by a Management Board, under the supervision of a Supervisory Board.

== History ==
The successor to the Ministry of Electricity, RENEL, was founded in 1990.

The Romanian Energy sector was reorganized in 1998, by creating (in compliance with GD 365), a holding company, CONEL, with four subsidiaries: Termoelectrica, Electrica, Hidroelectrica, Nuclearelectrica. In 2000, these four companies became, in compliance with GD 627, fully state-owned companies. Additionally, Transelectrica was also created.

In 2001, a strategy for the development and modernization of the energy system is drawn up, Hidroelectrica included, with the main purpose of attracting private capital to complete the investments initiated.

A reorganization process follows in 2002 for Hidroelectrica, completed with the establishment of eight repair and maintenance companies.

In 2003, a severe drought has serious consequences on the activity of Hidroelectrica. But the company manages to develop a relaunch strategy for 2004-2025.

As a result, in 2004 Hidroelectrica manages to pay off 60% of the company's debt and a year later achieves a record for the company's electricity production - 20.1 TWh. At that point, the company’s results saw Hidroelectrica rank 6th in the "Top 100 most valuable companies in Romania", made by Ziarul Financiar.

In 2008, Hidroelectrica ranks 5th in the same top.

In 2010, Hidroelectrica achieves a production of 19.85 TWh and sees a record profit, given the national and international crisis conditions.

But in 2012 the company went into insolvency in order to reorganize its business. The Ministry of Economy, Trade and Business Environment, the majority shareholder of the company, with 80.06% of the share capital, and Proprietatea Fund, as a minority shareholder, with 19.94% of the share capital, decide to appoint Remus Vulpescu as special administrator of Hidroelectrica.

In 2013, the measures to optimize the company’s activity saw a decrease in the organizational chart by 315 positions starting with January 16. 154 employees were laid off and 161 vacancies were reduced.

In 2014, Hidroelectrica ended the financial year with the highest turnover in the company's history, of 3.4 billion lei, with the highest profit ever recorded, of 1.2 billion lei, and with the lowest production price in the last 5 years - of 108 lei / MWh.

In 2015, Hidroelectrica kept outstanding results, registering a gross profit of 1.1 billion lei with a turnover of 3.1 billion lei.

In 2017, the company sees historical results: a turnover of 3.2 billion lei, net profit of 1.6 billion lei and an EBITDA of 69%.

Starting 1 March 2019, with GEO 114/2018, the regulated market was reintroduced in Romania, reversing the trend of liberalization of the energy market in Romania, completed in 2017.

During 2019, in accordance with GEO 109, the selection procedures were established, both for the members of the Supervisory Board and for the Hidroelectrica Board of Directors. The company thus fulfilled one of the necessary conditions to ensure the implementation of the development strategy, by ensuring a stable executive management, with a four-year term, and in July 2019, the shareholders approved the company's Management Plan for a period of four years.

== Privatization ==
In 2013, the decision was made to list 10% of the shares of the electricity producer on the Stock Exchange. The decision came by Government Decision 1066 for the approval of the privatization strategy of the Electricity Production Company in Hydroelectric Power Plants "Hidroelectrica" - S.A. Bucharest, subsequently amended by GD 897/2017.

Hidroelectrica is in the process of preparing the listing process on the Stock Exchange.

== Extension ==
In April 2009, the Ministry of Economy and Trade announced its intention to build a 1,000 MW storage and pumping power plant in Tarnița-Lăpuștești (Cluj County), a project estimated at over 1.1 billion euros. The Tarnița hydropower plant is to be equipped with four energy groups, each with a capacity of 250 MW. The construction of the Tarnița-Lăpuștești hydropower plant will lead to the improvement of the operating regime of the Cernavoda nuclear power reactors, of the fossil fuel thermal power plants and of those in cogeneration. At the same time, the hydropower plant will be able to ensure the adjustment of the system, the short-term emergency reserve and the optimal conditions for the installation of a capacity of more than 2,000 MW in wind farms. The construction of the hydropower plant is scheduled to be complete in five to eight years.

In November 2009, the Movileni hydroelectric power plant was inaugurated, on the Siret River, with an installed capacity of 33.9 MW and which will supply 112.4 GWh of energy per year. The value of the investment from Movileni was 650 million lei.

In August 2010, Hidroelectrica starts construction of the Cosmești hydroelectric power plant, part of the Siret River Hydropower Development on the Cosmești sector, with an estimated schedule of 3 to 3 and a half years and expected costs amounting to 618 million lei. The development extends over the territories of Galati and Vrancea counties and consists of two hydropower stages, Cosmești and Movileni, the latter being already completed. The plant will have an installed capacity of 37.8 MW (two groups) and will produce 130.1 GWh / year.

Hidroelectrica - Sibiu Hydroelectric Branch inaugurated the Robesti hydropower plant on December 20, 2011.

In May 2014, the commissioning of the first hydropower plant with pumped storage in Romania was at Frunzaru Hydroelectric Power Plant, Slatina Hydroelectric Power Plant.

In May 2015, Hidroelectrica signed the refurbishment contract of Stejaru-Bicaz HPP (Dimitrie Leonida), the first high power hydropower plant built in Romania, a contract won following a transparent procedure by the ROMELECTRO SA Association and LITOSTROJ POWER D.O.O.

In June 2016, by decision no. 4437/2016, pronounced in the public hearing of 21.06.2016 in case file 22456/3/2012 * pending before the Bucharest Tribunal, the insolvency procedure against Hidroelectrica was closed.

On March 30, 2017, the Bucharest Court of Appeal pronounced decision number 125 of March 30, 2017 in case file 22456/3/2012 * by which it permanently closed the Hidroelectrica insolvency procedure.

In December 2018, Hidroelectrica made operational Hydro aggregate 1 from CHE Calimanesti and Hydro aggregate 2 of the Beresti Hydroelectric Power Plant, after carrying out extensive refurbishment works.

In December 2019, Hidroelectrica signed the contract for the modernization of the 110 KV Power Station belonging to CHE Bradisor, part of the Lotru hydropower plant.

== Management ==
Board of directors:

- Karoly BORBELY President - CEO
- Marian FETITA Member - CFO
- Ianas RADOI Member - COO
- Bogdan Nicolae BADEA Member - CIO
- Radu Ioan CONSTANTIN Member - CAO

You can find more info here: https://www.contacthub.ro/contact-hidroelectrica-telefon/

== See also ==
- Energy in Romania
- Termoelectrica
- Nuclearelectrica
- Electrica
- Transelectrica
