= Monica Iacob Ridzi =

Romanian politician (born 1977)

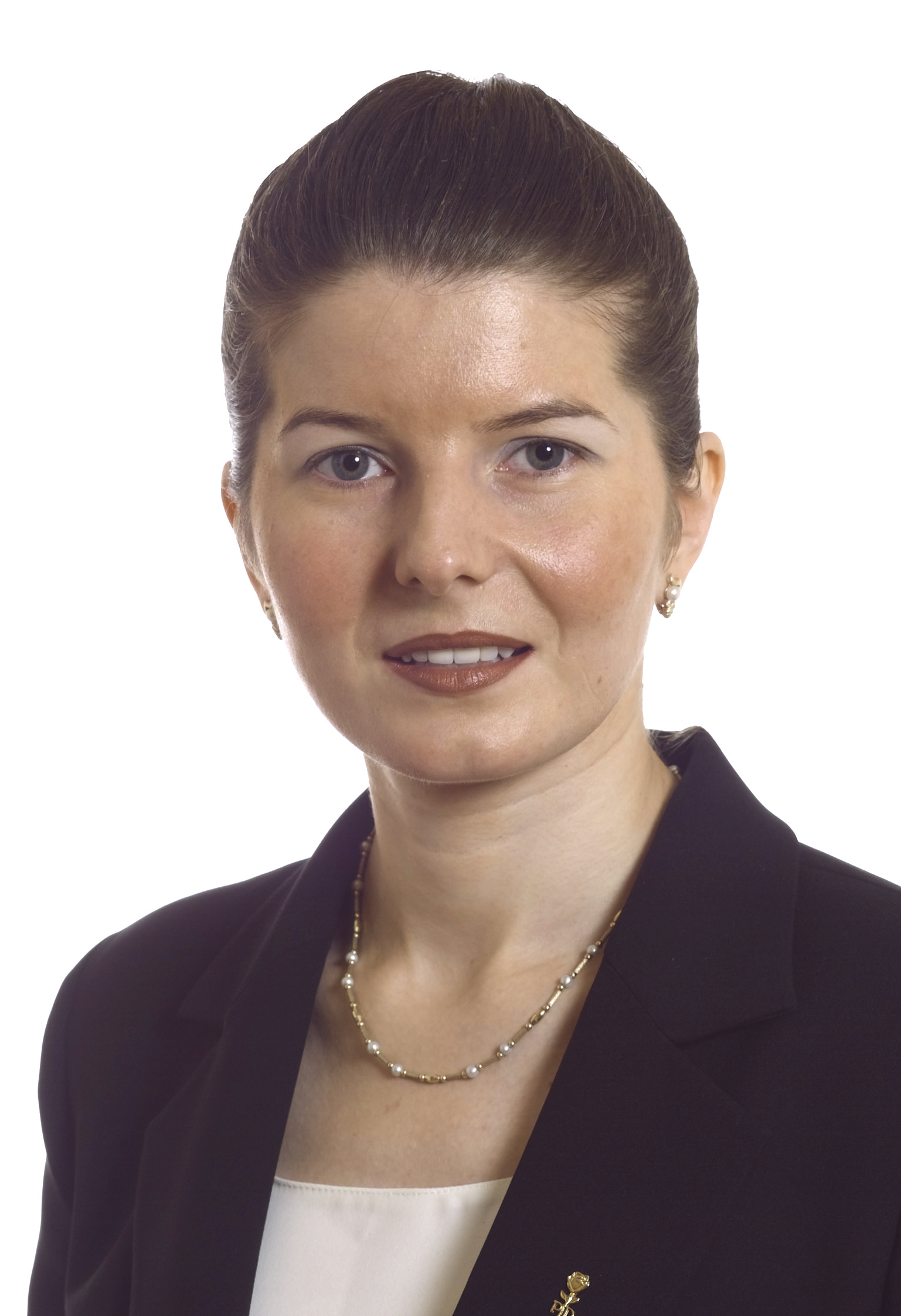
- Iacob Ridzi in 2007

Minister of Youth and Sport
- In office 22 December 2008 – 14 July 2009
- Prime Minister: Emil Boc
- Preceded by: Anton Anton
- Succeeded by: Sorina Luminița Plăcintă

Member of the European Parliament for Romania
- In office 1 January 2007 – 22 December 2008

Personal details
- Born: 30 June 1977 (age 49) Petroșani, Romania
- Party: PDL

Monica Maria Iacob Ridzi (born 30 June 1977) is a Romanian politician. She was the head of the youth wing of the Democratic Liberal Party, and a representative in the Chamber of Deputies of Romania since 2008. She is a former member of the Boc I Cabinet, and was a Member of the European Parliament during 2007–2008.

In February 2015, she received a 5-year prison sentence for abuse of office in relation to the 2009 Youth Day. On 3 December 2015, president Klaus Iohannis rejected Ridzi's pardon plea. In December 2017, she was released from prison, after spending nearly three years incarcerated.

== Political career ==
She became an MEP on 1 January 2007 with the accession of Romania to the European Union, and like other members of the Democratic Liberal Party she was part of the European People's Party–European Democrats.

On 22 December 2008, she was appointed the head of the newly re-founded Ministry of Youth and Sport in the Boc Cabinet. She resigned on 14 July 2009, after being investigated by a parliamentary commission regarding the possible embezzlement of money spent by the Ministry she was running on the Youth Day festivities.

== See also ==
- List of corruption scandals in Romania
