= Liga Profesionistă de Fotbal =

Romanian football organization

- Abbreviation: LPF
- Formation: 22 January 1993; 33 years ago
- Type: Sport governing body
- Headquarters: Bucharest
- Location: Romania
- Region served: Romania
- Official language: Romanian
- General Secretary: Justin Ștefan
- President: Gino Iorgulescu
- Vice President: Robert Pongracz
- Website: www.lpf.ro

The Liga Profesionistă de Fotbal (Professional Football League), also known by its acronym LPF, is a Romanian governing body that runs the Liga I, the top professional division of the Romanian football league system. Its current president is Gino Iorgulescu, elected in 2013 and re-elected in 2017.

== History ==
The first football organizational system was Colegiul Divizionar A ("Divisional College A"), founded on 5 October 1970 and led by Mircea Angelescu. Until 1990, the "Divisional College A" was formal, but without notable decisions. During the 1990s many changes were implemented, reflected in the new names of the organization, "Divisional Team's League A", "National Football League", "Professional Club's League", etc. On 10 October 1992, the name of the organization was changed into "Professional Football A Division League", with Mircea Angelescu acting as president, Dumitru Dragomir as vice-president and Daniel Lăzărescu as general secretary.

On 22 January 1993, the name of the organization became "Professional Football League of Romania", and on 13 October 1993, the Liga II—then named Divizia B—club's members were included. On 30 September 1996, Dumitru Dragomir was elected president, a position held for twenty years. The headquarters has been located on 47 Mihai Eminescu Street since February 1997. In December 1997, it was decided that LPF would organize the national league starting with the 1997–98 season. In November 2013, Gino Iorgulescu replaced Dragomir as the president of the organization.
