= Zsolt Nagy (politician) =

Romanian politician (born 1971)

Zsolt Nagy (born June 21, 1971 in Târgu Mureș) is a Romanian politician of Hungarian ethnicity.

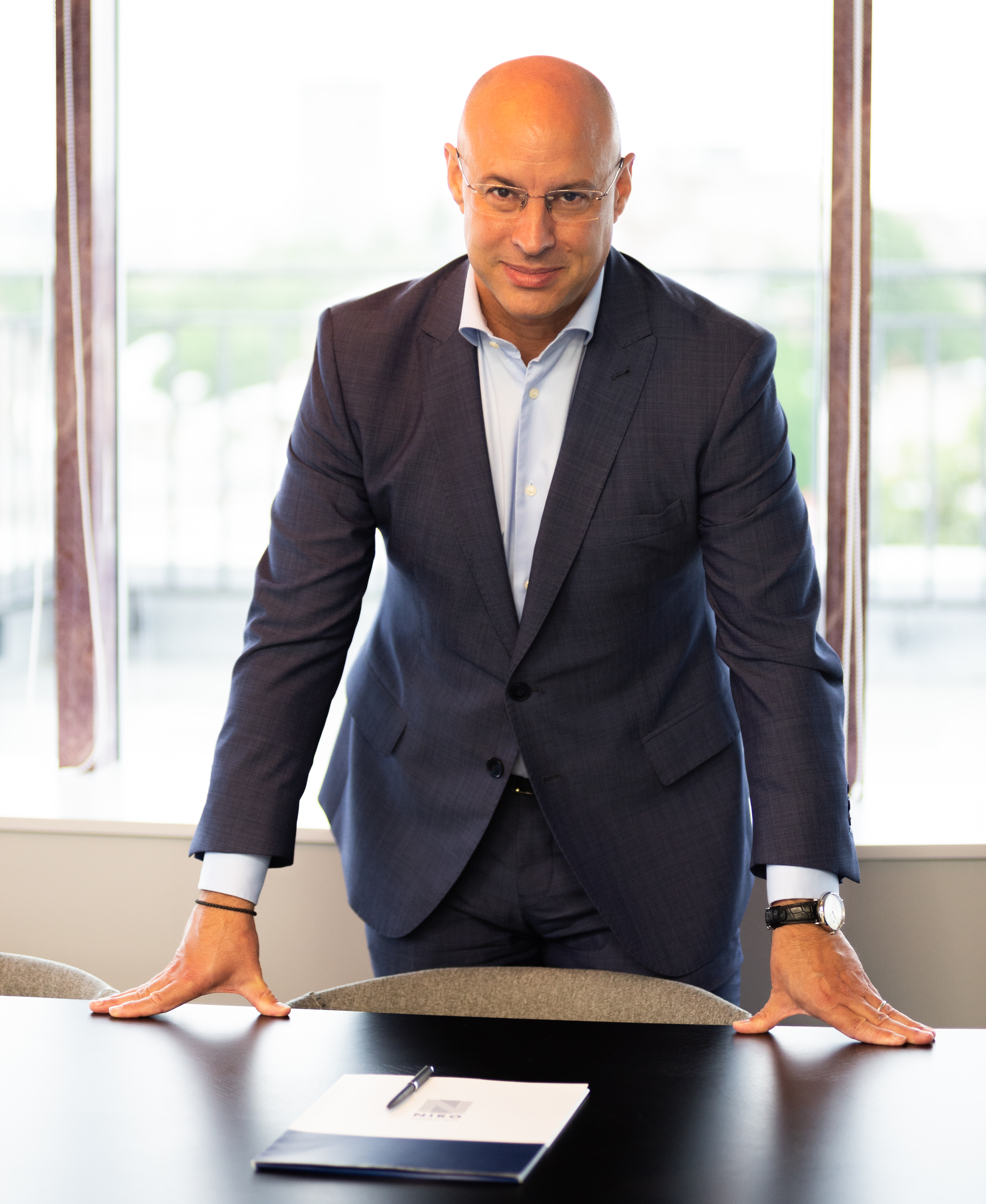
Nagy in 2023

From December 29, 2004 to April 5, 2007, he served as the Minister for Communications and Information Technology in the first government led by Călin Popescu-Tăriceanu.

Formerly was the CEO of Niro Investment Group, since 2017, having succeeded to gather relevant experience and partnership with national and international key players in the business environment. Niro Investment group has over 20 subsidiary companies and 2 humanitarian foundations, it has over 600 employees and develops and manages real estate properties. Nagy has restructured, optimized the company internally and closed successful negotiations with Accor Group (Swissotel) and Corinthia Group for two important hotel projects in Romania.

Since 2007, he has been actively involved in business development and consultancy in real estate, IT&C, mergers and acquisitions (M&A), renewable energy, and media. Some of his achievements are: closing 3 hotel management agreements (Starwood/Sheraton, Corinthia, Accor/Swissotel), developing renewable energy projects (4 wind farms and 2 photovoltaic plans), and M&A in Telecom.

During 2004–2007, he was the Minister for IT&C within the Romanian Government. Main achievements: launching 3rd GSM operator Cosmote (currently Telekom Romania), thus improving competitiveness in the telecom market and dropping the prices for endusers. Launching innovative projects: PLC (first time in Romania to provide Internet through Powerline Communication. G2C (Government to citizen projects): "Ghiseulvirtual.ro" - currently "ghiseul.ro" - as online payment interface for citizens to government. Restructuring of the Romanian Post. He also created and promoted the brand "Cre@tive Romania", thus attracting IT investors in Romania and promoting Romanian IT abroad. He also initiated legislation and regulation which made it possible for Romania to have one of the fastest Internet in Europe. Nagy implemented internet access points for rural areas. Not least, he was the one initiating and setting up the e-government Strategy of Romania.

1995 - 2007 - Political Professional - Leader of Democratic Alliance of Hungarians in Romania as Vice President. Achievements: Chief of National Campaign Staff, Representative in European Peoples Party, Restructuring the organizations, Setting-up national training system. Implementing internet access points for rural areas, Organising National Congress of the Party. He has been an active part of Romanian leadership and politics. He was also member of the European Popular Party (1999 – 2004), contributing massively to promoting Romania at European level, especially targeting the promotion of the potential IT Romanian sector.

== Education ==
After graduating the Bolyai Farkas Math–Physics High School in Târgu Mureș, he followed an engineering specialization, namely, the Technical University of Cluj-Napoca, Faculty of Automatics and Computing. He graduated in 1995 as a diplomat engineer in Industrial and Automatic Informatics.

He then followed courses for young political leaders in International Republican Institute: Young Political Leader's School (1996-1997), Fundația pentru Pluralism și DAC Hungary: Building the Future Together (1998-1999), National Democrat Institute: Political Parties Exchange: Campaign Management - Washington, D.C. (1999) and Robert Schumann Institute, Political Leader School - Budapest (2000).

While he was a student, he was a member of Hungarian Students Union in Cluj (1990-1995) and he became member of Hungarian Scientific and Technical Society (1992). He was president of Progress Foundation (2000) and became the president of Janovics Jenő Foundation (2004).

He speaks Romanian, Hungarian, and English fluently.

== Politics, UDMR ==
Nagy became a member of UDMR in 1990 and then member of the Executive Presidency of UDMR (1995). He had an organic growth of his political posture, in 1996 being deputy head of the whole national campaign for the general elections. One year later, he was the chief organizer of the UDMR congress, and again in 1999 and 2003. During the Parliamentary elections in 2000 he was, again, responsible for leading the elections process and then, in October 2003 he was appointed chief campaign for the referendum regarding the Constitution modifications. In 2004, he led both campaigns: the locals in 2004 and the legislative ones also in 2004.

Starting with 1995, he had executive and leadership roles in UDMR: executive vice-president for youth (1995-1999), executive vice-president for territorial organizations (1999-2003) and executive vice-president for territorial organizations and local public administration (2003-2005). He was UDMR's representative within the European Democrat Union and European Peoples Party (1998-2009).

== Personal life ==
Zsolt Nagy is married and has four children.

== Achievements as Minister of IT&C ==
Nagy was appointed as minister of Communication and Information Society in the Tăriceanu I Cabinet on December 29, 2004. The most important achievements:

- Launching the third GSM operator – Cosmote, currently Telekom, thus succeeding to considerably improve the competitivity in the telecom market and significantly reduce the tariffs for the end-users.
- He has launched several innovative projects: PLC – for the first time in Romania, internet was provided through Powerline Communication. G2C (Government to citizen) projects: he was the initiator of "Ghiseulvirtual.ro" – currently "ghiseul.ro" – which is the online interface between citizen and administration.
- Restructuring of the Romanian Post.
- He also created and promoted the "Cre@tive Romania" brand, through which many IT investors became interested and acquainted with Romanian IT sector potential.
- He initiated the necessary legal framework and regulations, thus Romania succeeding.
- Nagy has implemented internet access in rural areas.
- He has initiated and formed Romania's e-government strategy.

== Controversies ==
Zsolt Nagy was accused by the National Anticorruption Directorate (DNA) that, together with the Minister of Justice Tudor Chiuariu, he elaborated and signed Government Decision HG 377/2007, through which a building and its terrain that belong to the Romanian Post was changed as legal regime form publicly owned by the state to the legal regime of privately owned by the state.

Nagy declared that in 1998 the Romanian Post became a “company” by legal framework and all its properties had to be legally aligned with that regime. Rightfully so, despite the legal trial and the conviction Nagy endured, his actions proved to be right, since the Government Decision he initiated has been implemented and is respected until this day. The terrain is even now, 6 years after the trial, still privately owned by the Post, respected and implemented as legal decision, despite the fact that Nagy was convicted for it. He has never been accused or convicted of sub-evaluation, taking or giving any material advantages.

Nagy was also accused that, as a minister, he supported “morally and intellectually” an organized group, in the famous “strategic privatizations” file. There are no facts or proven wrong deeds imputed to Nagy, only phone conversations of other thirds parties talking and mentioning his name. He has been suspended from his position. Even though convicted, no privatization took place till this day and no prejudice has been imputed upon him. Finally, in 2016, the Constitutional Court decided and declared that the Romanian Intelligence Service (SRI) cannot operate any legal prosecution, even though this whole file and trial was based only on phone conversations of third parties. Sadly, these Court Decisions cannot be implemented retroactively.

In his defense, after his conviction, four decisions of the Constitutional Court were issued:

- The Constitutional Court defines the abuse as breaking a law that produces prejudices and unlawful material advantages. Nagy never produced any prejudice and was never even accused of this by initiating a Government Decision. On the contrary, it is important to mention that it would have been a breaking of the law of the terrain had not been properly and legally aligned with its privately owned regime.
- The Constitutional Court decided the members of the Government cannot be investigated regarding the circumstances of adopting normative acts.
- The Constitutional Court decided that the panels consisting of 3 judges could not have judge DNA files, because there was supposed to be a specialized panel for such trials.
- The Constitutional Court decided in 2019 that the panels of 5 judges had been illegally constituted since February 2014.

All people that had on-going trials benefited from these decisions. The decisions could not be applied retroactively, so it was too late for Nagy. That is why, he is waiting for a response from the European Human Rights Court.
