= Ponta Cabinet =

Ponta Cabinet may refer to the following governments of Romania, led by Victor Ponta:

- First Ponta cabinet (May – December 2012)
- Second Ponta cabinet (December 2012 – March 2014)
- Third Ponta Cabinet (March – December 2014)
- Fourth Ponta Cabinet (December 2014 – November 2015)

== See also ==
- Victor Ponta (born 1972)
- Ponta (disambiguation)
