= Constantin Nicolescu (politician) =

Romanian politician (1945–2023)

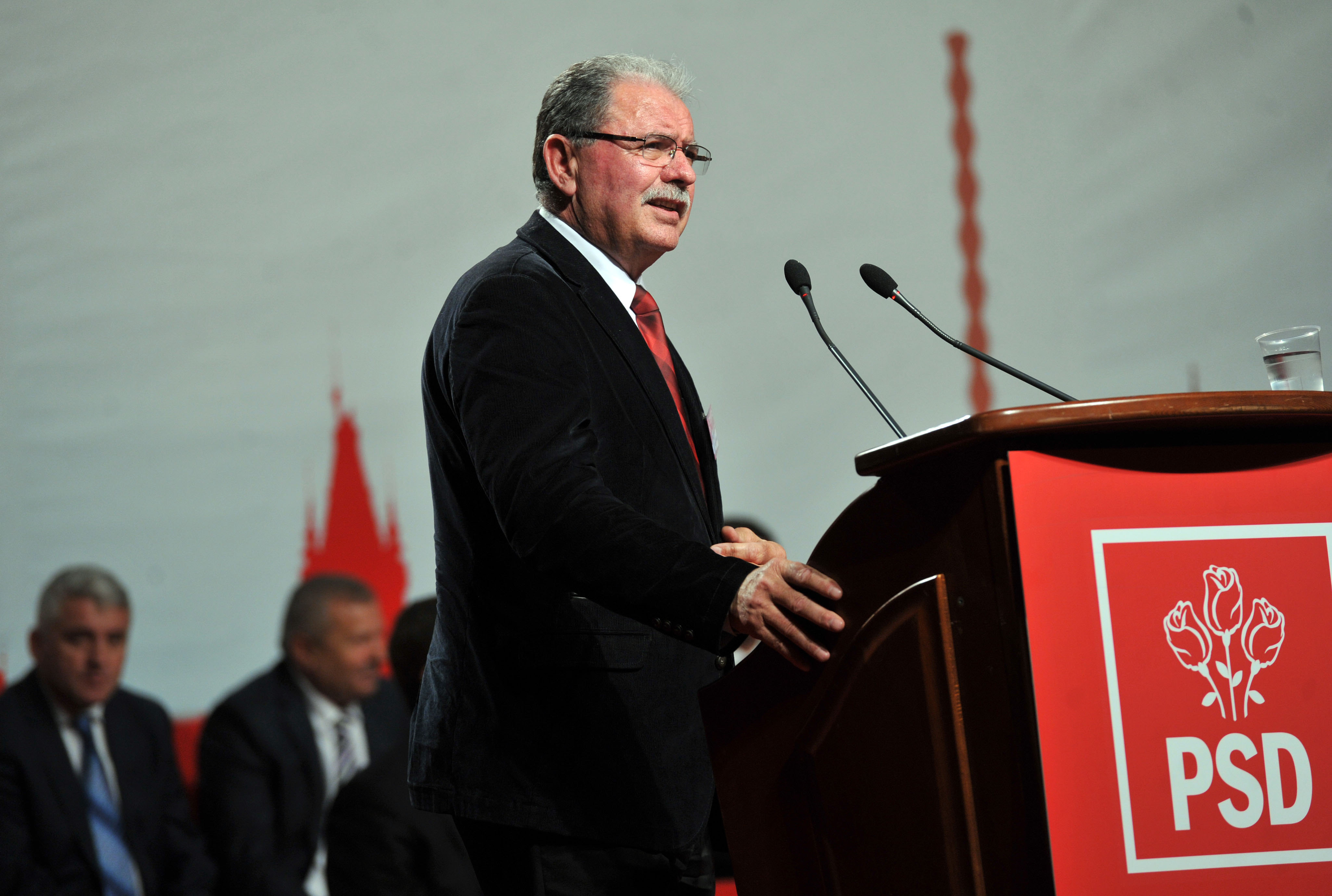
- Nicolescu in 2013

Member of the Senate of Romania
- In office 15 December 2000 – 30 November 2004
- Constituency: Electoral district no. 03 Argeș

Personal details
- Born: 1 September 1945 Mihăești, Argeș, Romania
- Died: 13 June 2023 (aged 77) Stâlpeni, Argeș, Romania
- Party: PSD
- Education: Politehnica University of Bucharest; Bucharest Academy of Economic Studies

Constantin Nicolescu (1 September 1945 – 13 June 2023) was a Romanian politician. A member of the Social Democratic Party, he served in the Senate from 2000 to 2004.

Nicolescu died of cancer in Mihăești, Argeș on 13 June 2023, at the age of 77.
