= Nu da șpagă =

Nu da şpagă ("Don't Bribe" in Romanian) is a national anti-corruption campaign launched in Romania in 2004 to deal with the problem of corruption in that country. The campaign is co-ordinated by Transparency International with the support of the European Union, which Romania joined in 2007. Corruption has been a problem in Romania since Communist times, but the situation has recently improved.
