= Poșta Română =

Postal service company in Romania

- Type: Joint stock company (state-owned)
- Industry: Postal services
- Founded: 1862; 164 years ago
- Headquarters: 140 Bulevardul Dacia, Sector 2, Bucharest, Romania
- Number of employees: around 25,000 (2017)
- Website: posta-romana.ro

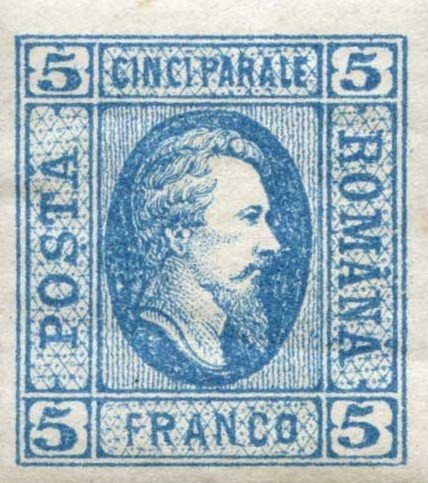
An 1865 stamp of Romania.

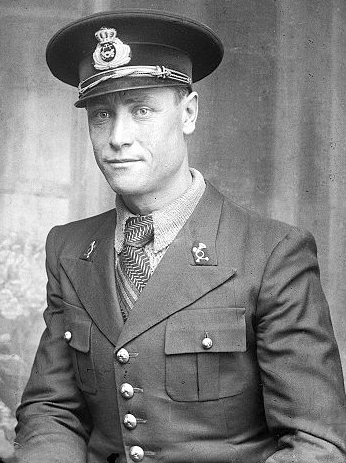
Post Office clerk wearing a uniform circa 1931-1941

CN Poșta Română SA is the national operator in the field of postal services in Romania. It is the sole supplier of universal service in any point on the Romanian territory.

Poșta Română is active on the free market of value added postal and press services, as competitor, and performs collateral activities, required for performing in profitable terms the main objects of activity thereof, namely the external trade, supply, research and technological and information design, medical services, education and social-cultural services, etc.

== History ==
The post in the Romanian provinces is known since the Middle Ages. It was created from the need to spread the sovereigns' orders up to the limits of the territory they owned. Sovereigns' couriers used horses, dutifully given to them by the inhabitants of the transited villages and towns.

The first document attesting the existence of postal services in Romanian-speaking lands was "The Charter" issued by Sovereign Mircea the Elder, in 1399, at Giurgiu. By this, localities were required to provide the royal couriers with transportation means, horses and two wheels carts, named remount.

At the beginning, the post was mainly based on the transportation of travellers and official mail of the high seniors and sovereigns. After 1850, in the administrative cities, the urban postal stations were converted into post offices. At that time, there were 30 postal routes, with postal stations, having Craiova as joint centre. In 1852, the mail service for private individuals was organized, under the supervision of the Ministry of Finances.

On July 23, 1862, the 527 Decree was issued regarding the unification of the postal administrations of Moldavia and Wallachia, starting with August 1, 1862. Following the unification, the general directorate management is entrusted to Panait Sevescu, who had also been managing Muntenia branch since December 1860.

== Quality and international relations ==
During the years, Poșta Română has developed an active policy meant to strengthen the co-operation and the partnerships at different levels.

In 2004, Romania organised the 23rd UPU Congress, an event that set the policy and strategy for the international postal activity in a time of rapid change of the global postal business.

Poșta Română is a founding member of the Universal Postal Union since its foundation in 1874. In 2004, Poșta Română was the host and organiser of the UPU's 23rd Universal Postal Congress, which was held in Bucharest.

Between 2004 and 2008, Romania held the chairmanship of UPU Council of Administration contributing in this way to the decision-making process regarding the future of the postal services.

Poșta Română is also a founding member of PostEurop (The Association of the European Public Postal Operators) in 1993 and it was actively involved its activities by participating to several European projects, by contributing to the work of various Posteurop Committees and working groups and by facilitating the organization of two PostEurop Plenary Assemblies in Bucharest in 1996 and 2004.

== See also ==
- Poșta Română @ issuu
- Poșta Română @ flickr
- Postage stamps and postal history of Romania
- Postal codes in Romania
