= Electrica =

Romanian electricity company

- Type: Joint-stock company
- Traded as: BVB: EL; LSE: ELSA
- Industry: Electricity
- Founded: 1990
- Headquarters: Bucharest, Romania
- Key people: Alexandru Aurelian Chirita, Chief Executive Officer; Costin Iordache, Chief Financial Officer; Andreea Ioana Lambru, Chief Development Officer
- Revenue: Approximately RON 11,403 million (Group, 2025)
- Number of employees: 7,484 (Group, 2025)
- Website: www.electrica.ro

Electrica S.A. is a Romanian energy company with a majority of its share capital privately held. It has been listed on the Bucharest Stock Exchange and the London Stock Exchange since July 2014.

Societatea Energetică Electrica S.A., headquartered in Bucharest, is the parent company of the Electrica Group. The Group operates in electricity distribution, supply and generation, natural gas supply and energy services. The company’s shares trade in Bucharest under the ticker symbol EL, while its global depositary receipts trade in London under the ticker symbol ELSA.

== Operations ==
=== Electricity distribution ===
Electricity distribution is carried out through Distribuție Energie Electrică Romania S.A. (DEER), the operator formed by the merger of the Group’s three distribution companies on 1 January 2021. DEER serves 18 counties across the Transilvania Nord, Transilvania Sud and Muntenia Nord regions.

The report for the first half of 2026 recorded approximately 4.011 million users and a network comprising 206,383 km of power lines across an area of 97,196 km². The company’s investments focus on network modernisation, equipment automation and the integration of renewable electricity generation.

In the first nine months of 2026, DEER distributed 13,316.7 GWh of electricity, according to preliminary operating indicators published on 23 October 2026.

=== Electricity and natural gas supply ===
Electrica Furnizare S.A. supplies electricity and natural gas to household and non-household customers. As at 30 September 2026, the supply segment served approximately 3.208 million electricity consumption points. In the first nine months of 2026, electricity supplied to the retail market totalled 4,943.2 GWh, according to preliminary operating indicators. Its market share by volume of electricity supplied was 14.27% in the period from January to May 2026.

Since 6 May 2026, Electrica S.A. has directly owned Electrica Furnizare Grup S.R.L., based in Chișinău, after acquiring its ownership interests from Electrica Furnizare. At the date of the half-year report, the company in the Republic of Moldova was exploring market opportunities.

=== Electricity generation and energy storage ===
The Group develops and operates renewable electricity generation facilities and develops battery energy storage systems. The operational Stănești, Vulturu and Satu Mare 2 solar farms have a combined installed capacity of 46.5 MWp. The project portfolio includes solar, wind, storage and cogeneration facilities.

According to preliminary operating indicators published on 23 October 2026, the Group generated 33,442 MWh of electricity at the Stănești, Vulturu and Satu Mare 2 solar farms in the first nine months of the year.

=== Energy services and grid technologies ===
Electrica Serv S.A. provides maintenance, repair and construction services in the energy sector. Electrica also holds a 25% stake in Electrica Esyasoft Smart Solutions S.A., an associate focused on smart grid technologies, energy storage and digitalisation.

== Generation and storage projects ==
=== Operational solar farms ===
Project	Installed capacity	Group entity
Stănești, Giurgiu County	7.5 MWp	Electrica S.A.
Vulturu, Vrancea County	12 MWp	Electrica S.A.
Satu Mare 2	27 MWp	Sunwind Energy S.R.L.

The Stănești solar farm was acquired by the Group in 2020. Satu Mare 2 was commissioned in October 2025.

=== Projects under construction ===
Project	Description	Group entity
Satu Mare 3	A 62.5 MWp solar farm near Doba, Satu Mare County. The engineering, procurement and construction contract was announced in June 2026.	New Trend Energy S.R.L.
Bihor 1	A solar farm with an associated energy storage system. The engineering, procurement and construction contract was announced in May 2026.	Foton Power Energy S.R.L.
Fântânele, Mureș County	A standalone battery energy storage facility with a capacity of approximately 70 MWh.	Electrica S.A.

=== Projects under development ===
The Crucea Est wind project, developed through Crucea Power Park S.R.L., is described as having a capacity of 121 MW and a 60 MWh storage component. In September 2026, competitive selection procedures were under way for the wind project, while the procedure for the storage component was being prepared.

At Vulturu, the Group is developing a 22.5 MWh storage system associated with the existing solar farm. The project benefits from European funding and was at the stage of preparing the competitive selection procedure. As at 30 June 2026, Electrica had announced that it had obtained technical grid connection approvals for a further 17 storage projects with a combined capacity of approximately 700 MWh.

=== Cogeneration in Craiova ===
In August 2026, Electrica’s shareholders approved the Craiova investment project, which comprises two components: supplying heat to the city’s district heating system and supplying heat for heating and industrial processes to Ford Otosan România.

The component serving the district heating system provides for approximately 82 MW of electrical capacity and 208 MW of thermal capacity. Initial estimates for the industrial component are 32 MW of electrical capacity and 70 MW of thermal capacity from cogeneration, together with 38 MW of thermal capacity from peak-load and backup facilities.

== Investment and financing ==
The approved investment plan for 2026 provides for capital expenditure of approximately RON 1,914.2 million at Group level, including RON 995 million for DEER. The Group’s strategy for 2030 includes modernising distribution infrastructure, developing generation and storage, diversifying services and digitalising operations.

In July 2025, Electrica issued EUR 500 million in green bonds, maturing on 14 July 2030 and carrying an annual coupon of 4.375%. The bonds are listed on the Luxembourg and Bucharest stock exchanges. The proceeds are intended to finance or refinance eligible projects under the company’s green financing framework.

=== Shareholding structure ===
As at 30 June 2026, Electrica’s share capital was RON 3,395,530,040, divided into 339,553,004 shares. The Romanian state, represented by the Ministry of Energy, was the largest shareholder, with a 49.7850% stake.

Shareholder or category	Number of shares	Shareholding
Romanian state, through the Ministry of Energy	169,046,299	49.7850%
Other legal entities	156,446,673	46.0743%
Individuals	13,761,868	4.0529%
BNY Mellon DRS	298,164	0.0878%
Total	339,553,004	100.0000%

=== Financial results ===
The Group’s consolidated results for 2024 and 2025, as presented in September 2026, are set out below. Amounts are rounded and expressed in RON million.

Year	Revenue	EBITDA	Net profit
2024	9,238	1,449	470
2025	11,403	2,383	1,219

=== Employees ===
As at 31 December 2025, the Electrica Group had 7,484 employees, compared with 7,794 at the end of 2024.

Year	Employees at year end
2021	8,013
2022	7,911
2023	7,945
2024	7,794
2025	7,484

== History ==
=== Origins of the Electrica name ===
The chronology published by the company records the establishment of Societatea Română pentru Întreprinderi Electrice Industriale in Bucharest in 1898. In 1921, it adopted the name Electrica, Societate Anonimă Română. This milestone in the history of the name predates the reorganisations that gave rise to the present-day company.

=== Sector reorganisation after 1990 ===
Regia Autonomă de Electricitate (RENEL) was established in 1990 as a state-owned enterprise bringing together electricity and heat generation, transmission and distribution, as well as the development of the national energy system.

In 1998, the restructuring of RENEL led to the formation of Compania Națională de Electricitate (CONEL), Nuclearelectrica and Regia Autonomă pentru Activități Nucleare. Within CONEL, Termoelectrica operated thermal power plants, Hidroelectrica operated hydroelectric power plants, and Electrica was responsible for electricity distribution and supply.

In 2000, CONEL was dissolved, and Electrica, Termoelectrica and Hidroelectrica became independent state-owned companies. Transelectrica assumed the role of transmission system operator, with OPCOM as its subsidiary responsible for administering the electricity market.

=== Electrica in 2002 ===
The reorganisation provided for in Government Decision No. 1342 of 27 December 2001 was implemented in 2002. Electrica’s regional electricity distribution and supply activities were organised into eight subsidiaries, each with separate legal personality and initially wholly owned by the company.

Distribution and supply subsidiary	Headquarters
Electrica Transilvania Nord	Cluj-Napoca
Electrica Transilvania Sud	Brașov
Electrica Muntenia Nord	Ploiești
Electrica Muntenia Sud	Bucharest
Electrica Banat	Timișoara
Electrica Moldova	Bacău
Electrica Oltenia	Craiova
Electrica Dobrogea	Constanța

The eight subsidiaries combined electricity distribution and supply activities at regional level. These activities were subsequently legally separated in 2007 within the companies that remained in the Group.

=== Privatisations in 2005 and Electrica in 2006 ===
In 2005, majority stakes in the Banat, Dobrogea, Moldova and Oltenia subsidiaries were privatised. Enel acquired control of Electrica Banat and Electrica Dobrogea, E.ON became the majority shareholder of Electrica Moldova, and CEZ acquired control of Electrica Oltenia. Electrica retained minority stakes in these companies.

Subsidiaries privatised in 2005	Investor	Stake	Initial transaction value
Electrica Banat and Electrica Dobrogea	Enel	51% in each	EUR 112 million combined
Electrica Moldova	E.ON	51%	EUR 100 million
Electrica Oltenia	CEZ	51%	Approximately EUR 151 million

The amounts announced for the privatisations included both the purchase of existing shares and participation in capital increases. For Banat and Dobrogea, Enel initially acquired 24.62% of each company and increased its stakes to 51% through capital increases.

In 2006, Electrica continued to control the Transilvania Nord, Transilvania Sud, Muntenia Nord and Muntenia Sud subsidiaries. The privatisation of Muntenia Sud was completed only in 2008 and was therefore separate from the four privatisations completed in 2005.

=== Electrica after 2007 ===
Under Government Decision No. 675 of 28 June 2007, the Muntenia Nord, Transilvania Nord and Transilvania Sud subsidiaries were reorganised through partial demergers to separate electricity supply from distribution. Three supply companies were established, while the existing companies continued to operate as distribution operators, with their names and business activities amended accordingly.

^{[10]}

Region	Distribution company	Supply company
Muntenia Nord	Electrica Distribuție Muntenia Nord	Electrica Furnizare Muntenia Nord
Transilvania Nord	Electrica Distribuție Transilvania Nord	Electrica Furnizare Transilvania Nord
Transilvania Sud	Electrica Distribuție Transilvania Sud	Electrica Furnizare Transilvania Sud

The privatisation of Electrica Muntenia Sud was completed in June 2008. According to Enel’s press release of 5 June 2008, the investor acquired a 64.4% stake in a transaction worth approximately EUR 820 million. This comprised the purchase of 50% of the shares for approximately EUR 395 million and a capital increase of approximately EUR 425 million.

Electrica Furnizare S.A. was established on 22 July 2011 through the merger of Electrica Furnizare Muntenia Nord, Electrica Furnizare Transilvania Nord and Electrica Furnizare Transilvania Sud, in accordance with Government Decision No. 930/2010.
