= National Anticorruption Directorate =

Romanian anti-corruption agency

National Anticorruption Directorate Direcția Națională Anticorupție (DNA)
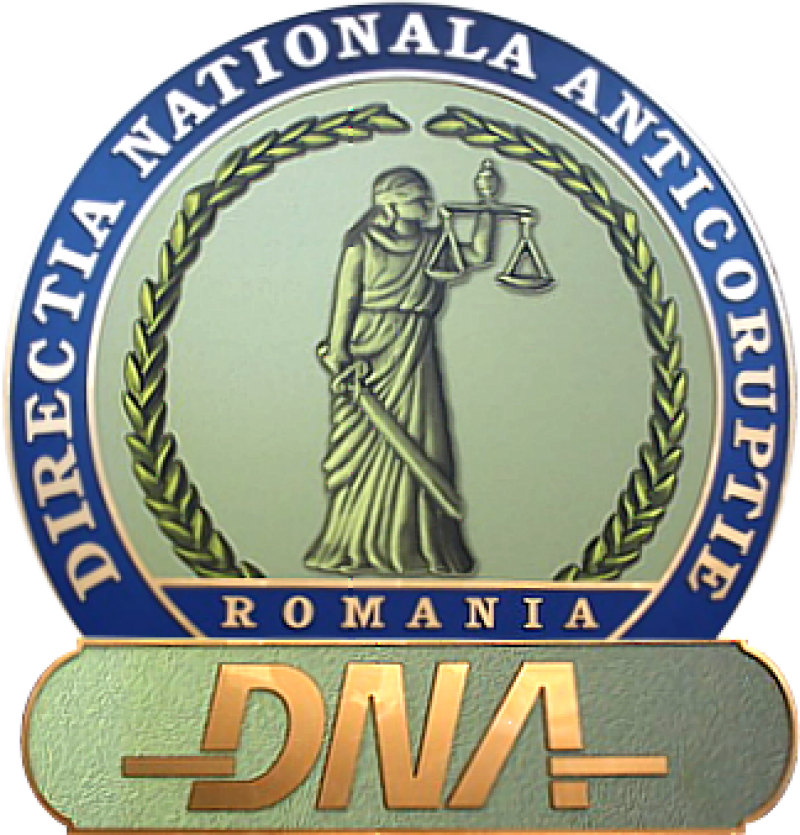

Agency overview
- Formed: 2002 (as PNA)

Jurisdictional structure
- National agency (Operations jurisdiction): Romania
- Operations jurisdiction: Romania
- Legal jurisdiction: As per operations jurisdiction

Operational structure
- Headquarters: Bucharest
- Agency executives: Marius Ionuț Voineag, Chief prosecutor (incumbent); Laura Codruța Kövesi, Chief prosecutor (2013–2018)

Website
- www.dna.ro

The National Anticorruption Directorate (Romanian: Direcția Națională Anticorupție (DNA)), formerly National Anticorruption Prosecution Office (Romanian: Parchetul Național Anticorupție), is the Romanian agency tasked with preventing, investigating and prosecuting corruption-related offenses (such as bribery, graft, patronage and embezzlement) that caused a material damage to the Romanian state. The institution deals with the fight against high corruption offences, which have caused damage greater than €200,000 or if the object of the crime is property or sums of money amounting to over €10,000.

== History ==
The DNA was established in 2002 by the Emergency Ordinance no. 43/2002 of the Romanian Government. Initially the institution has been called the National Anticorruption Office (Parchetul Național Anticorupție), and between October 2005 – March 2006 was named the National Anticorruption Department, both operating as autonomous organizations attached to the High Court of Cassation and Justice. The model of organization of the DNA has been inspired by similar structures in Spain, Norway and Belgium. The DNA is headed by a Chief-Prosecutor and two deputies, nominated by the Minister of Justice and appointed by the President of Romania. The Chief-Prosecutor of the Directorate is subordinated to the General-Prosecutor of the Prosecutor's Office attached to the High Court of Cassation and Justice.

== Performance, opinion polls ==
Starting with 2013, the DNA successfully investigated thousands of corruption cases across the entire political spectrum. According to a report of the European Union, the Romanian DNA had "established an impressive track record in terms of solving high and medium level corruption cases". The DNA has also been an example in terms of its reporting, which shows a high degree of openness and willingness to analyse. According to an INSCOP survey, the trust of Romanians in DNA is very high (59.8%), in comparison with other institutions such as the Parliament (12.6%) or the Government (22.6%).

== Jurisdiction ==
The legislative framework which set up this organisation gave the DNA jurisdiction (authority) over high- and medium-level corruption cases. DNA is an independent entity in relation to the other judiciary branches, the prosecutor's offices attached to these branches, as well as in relations to other public authorities.

Criminal offences falling within jurisdiction of the DNA are those that have as the object of the crime goods or sums which are the equivalent of over €10,000 euro. The institution may also investigate offences connected with acts of corruption if these crimes have caused damage greater than €200,000 or if these types of activities have severely compromised public authorities or public institutions. DNA has exclusive and unlimited jurisdiction in fighting high-level corruption, including in pursuing members of parliament. Through subsequent legislative amendments, DNA's jurisdiction concerning low-level corruption has been eliminated, more precisely corruption cases concerning city mayors, police agents and notaries.

Any corruption case can be investigated by the DNA if the one who commits the crime falls into one of these categories:

- Officials: members of parliament, senators, members of government, state secretaries or undersecretaries, advisors to ministers, presidential advisors and state counsellors within the presidential administration, councillors of the prime minister, presidents and vice-presidents of county councils, the general mayor and the deputy mayors of Bucharest, the mayors and deputy mayors of Bucharest sectors, mayors and deputy mayors of cities in Romania, county councillors, prefects and sub-prefects;
- Legal practitioners: judges of the High Court of Cassation and Justice and the Constitutional Court, other judges and prosecutors; members of the Superior Council of Magistracy, the president of the Legislative Council and his deputy, the Ombudsman and his deputies;
- Finance: members and financial controllers of the Court of Audit and county chambers of audit, the governor, first deputy governor and the deputy governor of the National Bank of Romania, the president and vice-president of the Competition Council, the commissioners of the Financial Guard, customs staff, persons holding the senior positions (from director-level and up) in the autonomous administrations of national interest, of national companies and societies, of the banks and commercial companies to which the state is the majority shareholder, of the public institutions that have interest in privatisation processes, persons with senior positions in the units of the central finance and banking, the persons referred to in art. 81 of Law no. 78/2000 with ulterior modifications and completions, the liquidators of the judiciary and of the Authority for Valuation of State Assets (AVAS);
- Military and police officers: officers, admirals, generals and marshals; police officers;
- The heads of the central and local public authorities and institutions, persons in positions of control within them, with the exception of the heads of public authorities and institutions at the level of cities and municipalities, and persons with control functions within them, lawyers etc.

The DNA also has the authority to investigate criminal offences directed against the financial interests of the European Union, (Note: According to the Government emergency ordinance no.134/2005, DNA has the exclusive jurisdiction to the research of criminal offences directed against the interests of the European Communities, regardless of daun.) regardless of the value of the damage. Moreover, the DNA can investigate crimes of macroeconomic significance if they caused a material damage higher than the equivalent in lei of €1,000,000, in the cases of: fraud, forms of abuse of power, certain offences set out in the Customs Code, the criminal offences provided in Law no. 241/2005 for preventing and combating tax evasion. (Note: according to the Government emergency Ordinance no. 43/2002)

== Organization ==
The National Anticorruption directorate is headed by a chief prosecutor, two deputy heads and four departmental prosecutors. They are proposed by the Minister of Justice, appointed by President of Romania and approved by the Superior Council of Magistracy for a period of three years, with the possibility of being reappointed one more time. Acts of corruption committed by those who are included in these latter categories are investigated by prosecutors from other offices.

In order to efficiently solve corruption cases and other specific activities related to criminal prosecution, the DNA prosecutors are supported by the officers and agents of judicial police, as well as other specialists qualified in other fields: economy, finance, banking, customs, etc. These specialists work in the framework of operational teams led, supervised and controlled by the prosecutor responsible for the case.

According to the law, the DNA has financial independence, with funds being secured from the state budget. The chief prosecutor of the directorate is a secondary credit applicant.

DNA is composed of a central structure, fourteen territorial structures located in cities where there are courts of appeal, and a territorial office:

- The central structure in Bucharest: the department for combating corruption, the department for combating crimes connected with corruption, the department for combating corruption committed by military personnel;
- Territorial services in: Alba Iulia, Bacău, Brașov, Cluj-Napoca, Constanța, Craiova, Galați, Iași, Oradea, Pitești, Ploiești, Suceava, Târgu Mureș, Timișoara;
- Territorial office in Baia Mare within DNA Cluj.

== Sources of information ==
The DNA can be notified by citizens, companies as well as public authorities. The DNA can also take notice from information resulting from prosecutors' work or from information published in the media.

=== Complaints from citizens and legal persons ===
Complaints from citizens and legal persons can be of three types:

- Complaint – the situation in which a person contacts the DNA to report an offence that affected him or her.
- Denouncement – the situation in which a person, who has information about alleged crimes of corruption, communicates them to the DNA.
- Self-denouncement – the situation in which a person, who has committed an offence of corruption and wants to benefit from mitigation or exoneration of criminal responsibility, informs the DNA about the crime before this is found from other sources.

=== Referrals from public authorities and institutions ===
The following authorities may also refer corruption-related offences to the DNA:

- Audit-related authorities such as the Financial Guard, National Agency of Fiscal Administration or the Anti-fraud Department
- The police
- Other prosecution services
- Other services specialised in information gathering

== Activity ==
The 2014 Anti-corruption report of the European Commission has highlighted the Romanian DNA as one of five examples of good practices in anti-corruption agencies across the EU:

DNA has built a notable track record of non-partisan investigations and prosecutions into allegations of corruption at the highest levels of politics, the judiciary and other sectors such as tax administration, customs, energy, transport, construction, healthcare, etc. In the past seven years, DNA has indicted over 4 700 defendants. 90.25% of its indictments were confirmed through final court decisions. Nearly 1 500 defendants were convicted through final court decisions, almost half of them holding very high level positions. Key to these results has been DNA’s structure which incorporates, apart from prosecutors who lead and supervise investigations, judicial police and economic, financial and IT experts

— European Commission, The Anti-Corruption Report, 2014.

By 2015, acting under Laura Codruța Kövesi's leadership, the agency had gained traction against high-level corruption. The agency currently employs 120 prosecutors working on more than 6,000 cases, and has successfully prosecuted dozens of mayors, five MPs, two ex-ministers and a former prime minister in 2014 alone. Hundreds of former judges and prosecutors have also been brought to justice, with a conviction rate above 90%.

In 2015, 12 members of parliament have been investigated, including ministers: "we have investigated two sitting ministers, one of whom went from his ministerial chair directly to pre-trial detention," Kövesi said.

A 2015 poll suggested that 60% of Romanian trust DNA, compared to only 11% expressing their trust in the Parliament.

The former President of Romania, Traian Băsescu, interviewed in May 2016, called for the arrest of judges and prosecutors who breached defendants' human rights. Defendants frequently speak of humiliation in front of the media, with evidence leaked to the newspapers and broadcasters to discredit defendants in advance of their trials.

=== Collaboration with SRI ===
The DNA has also seen its relationship with Romania's domestic intelligence service, the SRI, questioned by Romanian media and the President of the Romanian Parliament's SRI Activity Oversight Committee. It has been alleged that the SRI carries out 20,000 telephone intercepts on behalf of the DNA every year.

== See also ==
- Corruption in Romania
- Laura Codruța Kövesi
- Nu da șpagă, a campaign coordinated by Transparency International
