= Voinescu (surname) =

Voinescu is a Romanian surname. Notable people with the surname include:

- Alice Voinescu (1885–1961), Romanian writer
- Eugeniu Voinescu (1842–1909), Romanian painter
- Ion Voinescu (1929–2018), Romanian football player
- Radu Voinescu (born 1958), Romanian poet and publicist
- Sever Voinescu (born 1969), Romanian journalist, political analyst, diplomat and politician

== See also ==
- Voina (disambiguation)
- Voicu (surname)
- Voinea (surname)
- Voineasa (disambiguation)
- Voinești (disambiguation)
