= Fourth Ponta cabinet =

Ponta IV
- 124th Cabinet of Romania
- Date formed: 17 December 2014
- Date dissolved: 17 November 2015

People and organisations
- Head of state: Traian Băsescu (17–21 December 2014); Klaus Iohannis (from 21 December 2014)
- Head of government: Victor Ponta
- No. of ministers: 22
- Member parties: PSD, UNPR, ALDE
- Status in legislature: Coalition (Majority)
- Opposition parties: PNL, UDMR, PMP, PNȚCD, PSRO, PRU
- Opposition leaders: Alina Gorghiu, Vasile Blaga, Hunor Kelemen, Eugen Tomac, Aurelian Pavelescu, Mircea Geoană, Bogdan Diaconu

History
- Outgoing election: 2012
- Legislature term: 2012–2016
- Predecessor: Ponta III
- Successor: Cioloș

The Fourth Ponta Cabinet was the government of Romania from 17 December 2014 to 17 November 2015. The Cabinet was supported by the Social Democratic Party (PSD), the National Union for the Progress of Romania (UNPR) and the Alliance of Liberals and Democrats (ALDE), the alliance forged by Călin Popescu-Tăriceanu's Liberal Reformist Party (PLR) and Daniel Constantin's Conservative Party (PC). Fourteen of the ministerial portfolios were held by PSD members, three by ALDE, two by UNPR and two by independent members (although Sorin Cîmpeanu was a member of PC).

== Overview and notable events ==
The Fourth Ponta Cabinet, unlike the previous cabinet, contained only politically appointed ministers. The post of deputy prime minister was abolished. In addition, eight ministerial portfolios were consolidated into four:

- the Ministry of Scientific Research was merged into the Ministry of Education;
- the Ministry of SMEs was merged into the Ministry of Economy;
- the Ministry of Water and Forests was merged into the Ministry of Environment; and
- the Ministry for the Budget was merged into the Ministry of Finance.

The reshuffling of the Third Ponta Cabinet came after ministers from the Hungarian-minority party, Democratic Alliance of Hungarians in Romania (UDMR), left the coalition and resigned from their respective ministries. Prime Minister Ponta decided to change the cabinet's image, which had been negatively affected by his loss in the November 2014 presidential elections and by a scandal involving voting procedures in the diaspora.

During the ceremony of taking the oath, outgoing president, Traian Băsescu, criticized two of the members of the new cabinet, Liviu Pop and Sorin Cîmpeanu, accusing them of contributing to the destruction of educational institutions, calling Ponta a liar and alluding to the plagiarism scandal that resulted in the prime minister surrendering his doctorate.

The Opposition, headed by the National Liberal Party (PNL), announced a possible motion of censure after 1 February 2015, with President Klaus Iohannis supporting the effort to bring down the Ponta government. Iohannis also expressed support for a PNL-led government. A no-confidence motion failed in September 2015, on a 207–276 vote.

On 4 November 2015, Victor Ponta and his Cabinet resigned amid mass protests against generalised corruption linked to the Colectiv nightclub fire, being succeeded by the Cioloș Cabinet, made up entirely by politically independent members.

== Structure ==
Image	Function	Incumbent	Party	In office since	Until
	Prime Minister	Victor Ponta	PSD	7 May 2012	5 November 2015
	Deputy Prime Minister, Minister of Internal Affairs	Gabriel Oprea	UNPR	17 December 2014	9 November 2015
	Minister of Regional Development	Liviu Dragnea	PSD	17 December 2014	15 May 2015
	Minister of Regional Development	Sevil Shhaideh	PSD	20 May 2015	17 November 2015
	Minister of Agriculture	Daniel Constantin	ALDE	17 December 2014	17 November 2015
	Minister of Culture	Ioan Vulpescu	PSD	17 December 2014	17 November 2015
	Minister of Foreign Affairs	Bogdan Aurescu	Ind.	17 December 2014	17 November 2015
	Minister of Defence	Mircea Dușa	PSD	17 December 2014	17 November 2015
	Minister of Finance	Darius Vâlcov	PSD	17 December 2014	15 March 2015
	Minister of Finance	Eugen Teodorovici	PSD	30 March 2015	17 November 2015
	Minister of the Economy	Mihai Tudose	PSD	17 December 2014	17 November 2015
	Minister of Justice	Robert Cazanciuc	PSD	17 December 2014	17 November 2015
	Minister of Transport	Ioan Rus	PSD	17 December 2014	11 June 2015
	Minister of Transport	Iulian Matache	PSD	17 July 2015	17 November 2015
	Minister of Health	Nicolae Bănicioiu	PSD	17 December 2014	17 November 2015
	Minister of Communications	Sorin Grindeanu	PSD	17 December 2014	17 November 2015
	Minister of Labour	Rovana Plumb	PSD	17 December 2014	17 November 2015
	Minister of Environment, Waters and Forests	Grațiela Gavrilescu	ALDE	17 December 2014	17 November 2015
	Minister of Education	Sorin Cîmpeanu	Ind.	17 December 2014	17 November 2015
	Minister of European Funds	Eugen Teodorovici	PSD	17 December 2014	30 March 2015
	Minister of European Funds	Marius Nica	PSD	30 March 2015	17 November 2015
	Minister of Youth and Sports	Gabriela Szabo	PSD	17 December 2014	17 November 2015
	Minister of Energy	Andrei Gerea	ALDE	17 December 2014	17 November 2015
	Minister for Relations with Parliament	Eugen Nicolicea	UNPR	17 December 2014	17 November 2015
	Minister for Social Dialogue	Liviu Pop	PSD	17 December 2014	17 November 2015
	Minister for Romanians Abroad	Angel Tîlvăr	PSD	17 December 2014	17 November 2015

=== Facts and statistics ===
The numbers below refer to the composition of the cabinet as of 20 May 2015:

- Number of ministers: 21
- Number of women: 4
- Number of men: 17
- Average age: 46.2 years
- Youngest minister: Marius Nica (34 years)
- Oldest minister: Mircea Dușa (60 years)

=== Party breakdown ===
Party breakdown of cabinet ministers:

- Social Democratic Party (PSD)
  14 / 21
- Alliance of Liberals and Democrats (ALDE)
  3 / 21
- National Union for the Progress of Romania (UNPR)
  2 / 21
- Independent
  2 / 21
