= Third Ponta cabinet =

Ponta III
- 123rd Cabinet of Romania

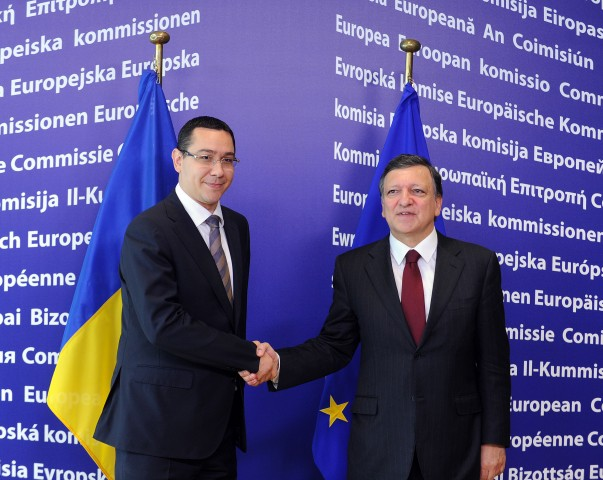
- Victor Ponta (left) and Jose Manuel Barroso (right)
- Date formed: 5 March 2014
- Date dissolved: 17 December 2014

People and organisations
- Head of state: Traian Băsescu
- Head of government: Victor Ponta
- Member parties: PSD, UNPR, PC, PLR, UDMR
- Status in legislature: Coalition (Majority)
- Opposition parties: PNL, PMP, PNȚCD
- Opposition leaders: Klaus Iohannis, Elena Udrea, Aurelian Pavelescu

History
- Legislature term: 2012–2016
- Predecessor: Ponta II
- Successor: Ponta IV

The Third Ponta Cabinet was the executive of Romania from 5 March to 13 December 2014. It was established after one day before it received the vote of confidence from the country's Parliament. The Third Ponta Cabinet is supported by PSD–UNPR–PC Alliance and an unregistered party (PLR) led by Călin Popescu-Tăriceanu. In December 2014, UDMR voted the egress from the government, invoking the result of the presidential election, inasmuch as Klaus Iohannis, PSD counter candidate, was voted by more than 70% of the electorate in the ethnic Hungarian counties.

== History ==
The Third Ponta Cabinet was approved by the Romanian Parliament on 4 March 2014 and took the oath in the presence of President Traian Băsescu on the evening of 5 March 2014.

== Controversies ==
Liberal Democratic Party and People's Movement Party, members of the opposition, submitted to the Constitutional Court of Romania a contestation against the government investiture, arguing that the government can't be invested without a political program. Even the President has repeatedly stated that he won't invest the government if it won't adopt as soon as a new political program. The Ponta Government announced the engagement of liability in Parliament for a new program, and therefore the Constitutional Court found, with 8 votes for and 1 against, that the contestation is redundant.

== Composition ==
| Function | Incumbent | Party | In office since | Until |
|---|---|---|---|---|
| Prime Minister | Victor Ponta | PSD | 5 March 2014 | 17 December 2014 |
Deputy Prime Ministers
| Deputy Prime Minister, Minister of Regional Development and Public Administration | Liviu Dragnea | PSD | 5 March 2014 | 13 December 2014 |
| Deputy Prime Minister, Minister of Internal Affairs | Gabriel Oprea | UNPR | 5 March 2014 | 13 December 2014 |
| Deputy Prime Minister, Minister of Agriculture and Rural Development | Daniel Constantin | PC | 5 March 2014 | 13 December 2014 |
| Deputy Prime Minister, Minister of Culture | Hunor Kelemen | UDMR | 5 March 2014 | 24 November 2014 |
| Deputy Prime Minister, Minister of Culture | Csilla Hegedüs | UDMR | 24 November 2014 | 13 December 2014 |
Ministers
| Minister of Foreign Affairs | Titus Corlățean | PSD | 5 March 2014 | 10 November 2014 |
| Minister of Foreign Affairs | Teodor Meleșcanu | Independent | 10 November 2014 | 18 November 2014 |
| Minister of Foreign Affairs | Bogdan Aurescu | Independent | 24 November 2014 | 13 December 2014 |
| Minister of National Defence | Mircea Dușa | PSD | 5 March 2014 | 13 December 2014 |
| Minister of Public Finance | Ioana Petrescu | Independent | 5 March 2014 | 13 December 2014 |
| Minister of Economy | Constantin Niță | PSD | 5 March 2014 | 13 December 2014 |
| Minister of Justice | Robert Cazanciuc | PSD | 5 March 2014 | 13 December 2014 |
| Minister of Transport | Dan Șova | PSD | 5 March 2014 | 24 June 2014 |
| Minister of Transport | Ioan Rus | PSD | 25 June 2014 | 13 December 2014 |
| Minister of Health | Nicolae Bănicioiu | PSD | 5 March 2014 | 13 December 2014 |
| Minister of Environment and Climate Change | Attila Korodi | UDMR | 5 March 2014 | 13 December 2014 |
| Minister for the Information Society | Răzvan Cotovelea | Independent | 5 March 2014 | 13 December 2014 |
| Minister of Labour, Family, Social Protection and Elders | Rovana Plumb | PSD | 5 March 2014 | 13 December 2014 |
| Minister of National Education | Remus Pricopie | PSD | 5 March 2014 | 13 December 2014 |
| Minister of European Funds | Eugen Teodorovici | PSD | 5 March 2014 | 13 December 2014 |
| Minister of Youth and Sports | Gabriela Szabo | PSD | 5 March 2014 | 13 December 2014 |
Minister Delegates
| Minister Delegate for Budget | Liviu Voinea | PSD | 5 March 2014 | 15 June 2014 |
| Minister Delegate for Budget | Darius Vâlcov | PSD | 28 August 2014 | 13 December 2014 |
| Minister Delegate for Small and Medium Enterprises, Business Environment and Tourism | Florin Jianu | Independent | 5 March 2014 | 13 December 2014 |
| Minister Delegate for Higher Education, Scientific Research and Technological Development | Mihnea Costoiu | PSD | 5 March 2014 | 13 December 2014 |
| Minister Delegate for Water, Forests and Pisciculture | Doina Pană | PSD | 5 March 2014 | 13 December 2014 |
| Minister Delegate for Energy | Răzvan Nicolescu | Independent | 5 March 2014 | 13 December 2014 |
| Minister Delegate for Relations with Parliament | Eugen Nicolicea | UNPR | 5 March 2014 | 13 December 2014 |
| Minister Delegate for Romanians Abroad | Bogdan Stanoevici | Independent | 5 March 2014 | 13 December 2014 |
| Minister Delegate for Social Dialogue | Aurelia Cristea | PSD | 5 March 2014 | 13 December 2014 |
