= Darius Vâlcov =

Romanian politician

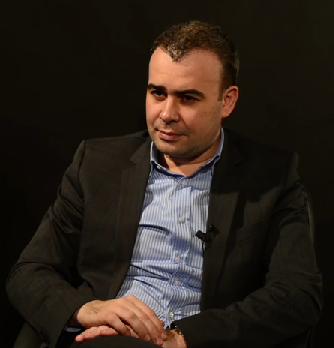

Minister of Finance
- In office 15 December 2014 – 15 March 2015
- Prime Minister: Victor Ponta
- Preceded by: Ioana Petrescu
- Succeeded by: Victor Ponta (Acting)

Personal details
- Born: 25 March 1977 (age 49) Slatina, Romania
- Party: Democratic Party (Before 2007); Democratic Liberal Party (2007–2012); Social Democratic Party (2012–present)
- Spouse: Lavinia Șandru (m. 2005–2015)
- Education: Bucharest Academy of Economic Studies; Spiru Haret University

Darius Vâlcov (born 25 March 1977) was a Romanian politician who served as Minister of Finance, Mayor of Slatina and Senator.

== Education ==
Vâlcov has obtained in 2008 a PhD degree from the Bucharest Academy of Economic Studies, but was accused to have plagiarised over half of his PhD thesis. He countered accusing the Romanian Intelligence Service (SRI) of making up the accusations.

== Political activity ==
He was elected Mayor of Slatina twice (in 2004 and 2008) on the behalf of the Democratic-Liberal Party. In 2012, he resigned from the party and joined the Social Democratic Party (PSD), being elected a Senator.

Between August and December 2014 he was the Budget Minister in the Third Ponta Cabinet, while from December 2014 to March 2015, he was the Minister of Finance in the Fourth Ponta Cabinet.

In June 2019 he resigned as economic advisor to the Prime Minister, in the wake of the imprisonment for corruption of his PSD political mentor, Liviu Dragnea.

== Legal problems ==
Vâlcov resigned on 15 March 2015 following the corruption investigation of the National Anticorruption Directorate.

He was convicted and sentenced to an 8-year prison sentence in 2018, pending appeal. The sentence included 4 years for influence peddling, 6 years for money laundering, 2 years for financial operations incompatible with public office. The prison sentences were combined into one. Additionally, Vâlcov was fined 6,200,000 Lei. He is wanted by the police for the execution of a 6-year prison sentence for influence peddling and money laundering.

== Personal life ==
Darius Vâlcov was married to fellow politician Lavinia Șandru until 2016.

Political offices
| Preceded by Ioana Petrescu | Minister of Finance; 2014–2015 | Succeeded by Victor Ponta; Acting |
