= Ioana Petrescu =

Romanian economist and politician

Ioana Maria Petrescu
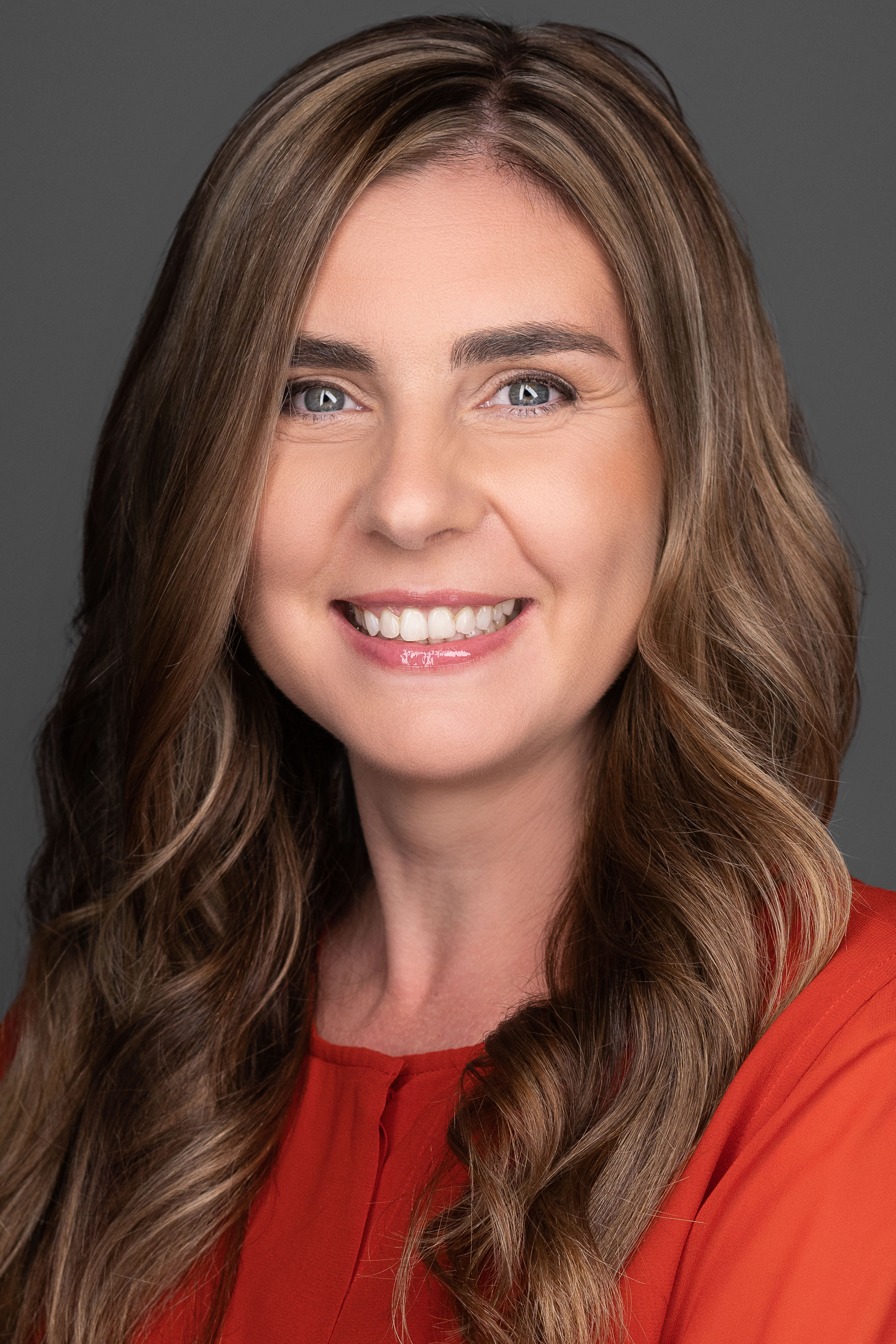

Minister of Finance
- President: Traian Băsescu
- Prime Minister: Victor Ponta; Third Ponta Cabinet
- Preceded by: Daniel Chițoiu
- Succeeded by: Darius Vâlcov

Personal details
- Born: July 1, 1980 (age 46) Bucharest, Romania
- Education: Wellesley College; Harvard University
- Occupation: scholar and activist
- Profession: economist
- Website: www.ioanapetrescu.ro

Ioana Maria Petrescu (born July 1, 1980) is a Romanian economist who served as the country's Finance Minister. She is a public policy scholar at Harvard Kennedy School and runs a Romanian NGO "Pur și Simplu Verde" that supports local governments in their efforts to transition to a greener economy.

== Biography ==
The daughter of two engineers, she was brought up by her grandparents in Cornu until she went to school in Bucharest. After graduating from the Mihai Viteazul high school, she received a B.A. in economics and mathematics from Wellesley College, and later a Ph.D. in economics from Harvard University.

She worked as an N.R.I. Fellow at the American Enterprise Institute in Washington, DC, before she became an assistant professor at the University of Maryland. Taking a two-year leave from teaching, she was named in the second half of 2013 a state counselor for economic affairs by Romanian prime-minister Victor Ponta.

== Finance Minister of Romania ==
After serving as economic adviser to the Prime Minister, in 2014 she has been named Romania's first female Finance Minister. While a minister, she pursued policies to cut tax evasion and tax avoidance, promote financial transparency, improve tax compliance, lower the tax burden for businesses and keep fiscal discipline. She cut the Social Security Tax paid by employers by 5pp to stimulate the business sector during the recovery from the Financial Crisis. She was considered the most performing minister in the Cabinet in June 2014 by the representatives of the business leaders. Other more notable achievements as a minister include the digitalization of the tax administration by the creation of the Personal Virtual Space, an online system of communication between taxpayers and tax administration, the introduction of the tax lottery to increase VAT compliance and the cap on cash transactions, a measure meant to encourage the use of other payment methods and the increase in the bank account use in Romania.

== Career ==
After leaving the ministry of finance, Ioana Petrescu led the Delivery Unit at the Prime Minister Chancellary handling the top six priorities of the prime minister including the public procurement reform, the energy strategy, and transparency in the State Owned Enterprises. She joined the new party, PRO Romania in 2018 and became vice-president and ran the governmental strategy council. She left the party in 2020 to create a non-profit organization, called Pur si Simplu Verde, with the under-secretary general of UN, Robert Orr and former finance and environment minister of Greece, George Papaconstantinou. The organization promotes the use of renewable energy and helps Romanian regions affected by energy transition to implement sustainable policies. In 2022, she was named European Climate Pact Ambassador and in this position, she promotes the use of renewable energy and green transportation at the local level in Romania. She currently is a senior research fellow at the Taubman Center for State and Local Government at the Harvard Kennedy School. In 2026 she was elected as a global space fellow for the Karman Project.
