= Sorina-Luminița Plăcintă =

Romanian politician (born 1965)

- Born: Sorina Ștefan; February 6, 1965 (age 60); Focșani
- Other names: Sorina Bucuraș
- Occupations: Engineer and politician

Sorina Bucuraș, better known as Sorina-Luminița Plăcintă (born Sorina Ștefan; February 6, 1965), is a Romanian engineer and politician. A member of the National Liberal Party and formerly of the Democratic Liberal Party (PD-L), she was a member of the Romanian Senate for Vrancea County from 2008 to 2012. In the Emil Boc cabinet, she was Minister of Youth and Sport from July to December 2009, and interim Minister-Delegate for Relations with Parliament from October to December 2009.

== Biography ==
She was born in Focșani and graduated from the Textile Technology and Chemistry faculty of the Gheorghe Asachi Technical University of Iași in 1989. From that year until 1993, she worked as an engineer at a worsted wool spinning mill in Focșani. From 1993 to 1994, she was assistant manager of an import-export firm in Bucharest. She was then active at three textile firms in Focșani until November 2008: at Soreste, she was stockholder, administrator and board president from 1994; at Milcofil, later purchased by Soreste, she was board president from 1997; and at Artifex, a joint venture between Soreste and Akris, she was administrator and general director from 2005.

In 1997, Plăcintă joined the Democratic Party (PD; later evolved into the PD-L). At the 2008 election, she won a Senate seat, and became vice president of that chamber's agriculture, forestry and rural development committee. In July 2009, following the resignation of scandal-plagued minister Monica Iacob Ridzi, Plăcintă was given the Youth and Sport portfolio and sworn in the same day. Her appointment was criticised by Vrancea County Council and PSD chapter president Marian Oprișan, who noted her links to the ministry were as close as those between "an old woman and a machine gun", and who pointed out she had contributed hundreds of thousands of euros to her party. The following month, she announced plans to cut in half the number of positions at her ministry. In October 2009, she became interim Minister for Relations with Parliament following the resignation of her PSD cabinet colleagues, including Victor Ponta, the previous occupant of that ministry, holding the portfolio until December. Her ministerial term ended when she was not reappointed to a new cabinet under Boc at the end of 2009. Nearly a year later, she was elected vice president of the Bucharest PD-L chapter. She resigned from the PD-L in June 2012, crossing to the PNL. She left the Senate at the end of 2012, having declined to run in that year's election.

She has one son from her first marriage, Andrei Plăcintă, who at one time lived in Montreux, Switzerland and was pastor of the First Church of Atheism, an organisation seeking to eliminate religious belief from the world. Plăcintă herself is the ktitorissa of two Romanian Orthodox churches. In 2012, her son was sentenced to six years' imprisonment for attempted manslaughter, theft and indecent exposure, charges that stemmed from an incident that took place in Bucharest two years earlier; the sentence was ultimately reduced to four and a half years. Her second husband was Stefan Sobota, her former business partner, who immigrated from Sweden in 1992; in 2010, she announced they would divorce. This had taken place by the following year, when she secretly married urologist Viorel Bucuraș, adopting his surname in 2012.
