= Voinea =

Voinea is a Romanian surname. Notable people with the surname include:

- Adrian Voinea (born 1974), Romanian tennis player
- Albert Voinea (born 1992), Romanian soccer player
- Camelia Voinea (born 1970), Romanian gymnast
- Florea Voinea (born 1941), Romanian soccer player
- Liviu Voinea (born 1975), Romanian banker
- Maricel Voinea (born 1959), Romanian handball player
- Marin Voinea (1935–2021), Romanian soccer player
- Petrișor Voinea (born 1990), Romanian soccer player
- Sabrina Maneca-Voinea (born 2007), Romanian artistic gymnast, daughter of Camelia

== See also ==
- Voina (disambiguation)
- Voicu
- Voineasa (disambiguation)
- Voinești (disambiguation)
