= Sebastian Ghiță =

Romanian politician (born 1978)

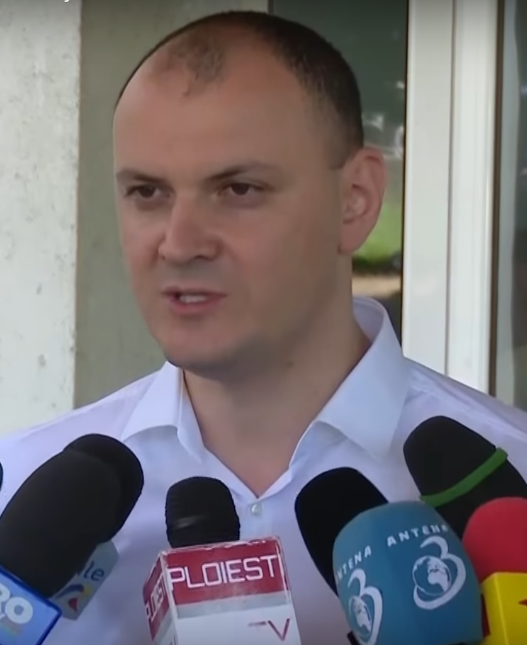

Member of the Chamber of Deputies
- In office 2012–2016

Personal details
- Born: 10 November 1978 (age 47) Ploiești, Prahova County, Socialist Republic of Romania
- Party: United Romania Party (since 2016)
- Other political affiliations: Social Democratic Party (until 2015); National Union for the Progress of Romania (2015-2016)
- Education: Petroleum-Gas University of Ploiești

Sebastian Aurelian Ghiță (born 10 November 1978) is a Romanian businessman and politician. He is the owner of Asesoft Group and of România TV news channel.

== Early life ==
Ghiță was born on November 10, 1978, in Ploiești, and, in 1997, at 18 years of age, he founded the Asesoft Company. He graduated from the Faculty of Economic Sciences at the Petroleum-Gas University of Ploiești in 2002.

== Political activity ==
A close partner of Victor Ponta, Ghiță joined the Social Democratic Party (PSD) and was elected in the Chamber of Deputies in 2012.

He left the Social Democratic Party in 2016 and founded, together with former PSD deputy Bogdan Diaconu, the United Romania Party (PRU). He was a candidate for PRU at the 2019 European Parliament election in Romania, but he failed to win a seat.

== Controversies ==
In 2002, he was sued in the file "Tracia – Asesoft", being accused of complicity in cheating and false statements, in connection with several oil transactions that led to the prejudice of the state budget of 2 million lei. On March 3, 2016, the Bucharest Court of Appeal definitively found the intervention of the prescription in this case, Sebastian Ghiță escaping the accusations.

He was criminally investigated in several cases being accused of money laundering, use of confidential information, ditching, bribery, buying influence, driving without a license and he was granted bail of 13 million euros. In September 2016, Ghiță self-denounced at the Prosecutor's Office: "I participated in the elaboration of the expert report on the doctoral thesis of Codruța Kovesi".

Sebastian Ghiță, who is under judicial control and is banned from leaving Romania, was last seen in public on Monday evening, December 19, 2016, at a SRI balance sheet meeting with parliamentarians who were part of the Parliament's Control Commission. A week after this disappearance, at the television station owned by Sebastian Ghiță, Romania TV, a series of undated recordings began to be broadcast, recordings in which he brought serious accusations against the chief prosecutor of the DNA, Laura Codruța Kövesi, and SRI General Florian Coldea. The latter was dismissed following the disclosures.

On 14 April 2017, Serbian and Romanian authorities announced the detention of Sebastian Ghiță by the Belgrade police. After a month and a half he was released from pre-trial detention and kept under house arrest for a bail of 200,000 euros.
