= Ilie Sârbu =

Romanian theologian, economist and politician

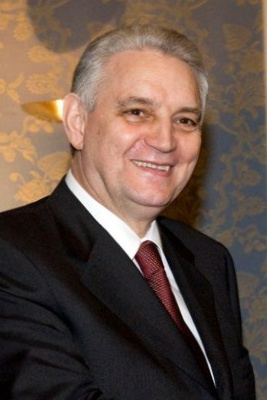

President of the Senate of Romania
- In office 28 October 2008 – 13 December 2008
- Preceded by: Nicolae Văcăroiu
- Succeeded by: Mircea Geoană

Personal details
- Born: 26 May 1950 (age 76) Obreja, Caraș-Severin County, Romania
- Party: Social Democratic Party
- Spouse: Mariana Sârbu
- Children: Daciana Sârbu
- Education: University of Craiova

Ilie Sârbu (born 26 May 1950) is a Romanian theologian, economist and politician. A member of the Social Democratic Party (PSD), he sat in the Romanian Senate from 2004 to 2015, representing Timiș County. In the Adrian Năstase cabinet, he was Agriculture Minister from 2000 until July 2004, and he held the same position in the Emil Boc cabinet between 2008 and 2009. He was Senate President for six weeks in 2008.

He and his wife Mariana have a daughter, Daciana Sârbu. She, in turn, is married to Victor Ponta, who served alongside Ilie Sârbu in the Boc cabinet.

== Biography ==
He was born in Ciuta, Caraș-Severin County and holds two degrees, one obtained in 1975 from the Sibiu Theological Institute and one in 1998 from the University of Craiova Economics Faculty, with a Management specialty. He also studied Theology in Geneva (1984–1985), English in Birmingham (1989) and Finance in Germany (1994). Sârbu became a professor at the Caransebeș Theological Seminary in 1976 and its director in 1978, remaining until 1981. From 1981 to 1991, he was an economic adviser at the Metropolis of Banat of the Romanian Orthodox Church. During 2006, two accusations were made that Sârbu collaborated with the Securitate during the 1980s. The first came from a former Timiș County agent, who charged that Sârbu had been recruited for a mission to the Vatican; the latter denied this and presented a CNSAS certificate confirming that his name does not figure in existing files as having been an informant or agent. Then, after a second CNSAS certificate again exonerated him, it emerged that Sârbu's name appeared on a list belonging to the former spy Liviu Turcu, and that he had been a domestic agent; Sârbu vehemently denied the new claim (labelling Turcu a "traitor") and said he had in fact been under Securitate surveillance.

Following the 1989 Revolution, Sârbu entered business, working as the director of Fangmeier, a Timișoara-based grain distributor, from 1991 until 2000. In 1992, he helped secure the first McDonald's contract for Romania. He also joined the PDSR (predecessor of the PSD) in 1993. From that year until 2001, he was vice president of the Timiș County party chapter, and also sat on the party's national council. From 2001 to 2004 he was a member of the PSD's central coordinating bureau. Since 2004 he has headed the PSD's Timiș County chapter, and since 2005 he has been a vice president of the national party. During 2000, he was president of the Timiș County Council, and was appointed Agriculture Minister at the end of that year. In this capacity, he led and finalised negotiations with the European Union on the Agriculture chapter of the acquis. Several scandals affected his term: in 2001, he was accused of criminal involvement in the privatisation of a Prahova County company, but later cleared; in 2003, a number of national newspapers alleged that he obtained a spacious central Bucharest villa at far below market value through a shady deal; also, he lost a testicle in a hunting accident that December. He was dismissed in July 2004 by Prime Minister Adrian Năstase so he could focus on party work, and stated the move came as "a surprise" to him.

Later in 2004, Sârbu was elected senator, serving as the body's secretary and, from October to December 2008, as its president, being elected to that position following the resignation of Nicolae Văcăroiu. In 2008, he was re-elected senator and named Agriculture Minister once again. In this capacity, he pledged to find new markets for Romanian agricultural products and to obtain additional funds through the European Agricultural Fund for Rural Development. Regarding the latter priority, at the April 2009 Council of Ministers meeting, he secured a commitment to raise subsidies by €35 per hectare, benefiting around 1.25 million farmers. Previously, he had fired 60 managers at the agency responsible for distributing the EU funds because of repeated delays in starting payments. Together with his PSD colleagues, Sârbu resigned from the cabinet on 1 October 2009 in protest at the dismissal of vice prime minister and Interior Minister Dan Nica. The following August, he was elected PSD leader in the Senate. In August 2015, he announced his withdrawal from politics, ahead of a planned confirmation to the Court of Accounts; this took place the following month. Between 2014 and 2018, when the case was dropped, the National Anticorruption Directorate investigated him for illegally privatizing 44,000 hectares of forests owned by Romsilva, alongside Viorel Hrebenciuc. In late 2023, Environment Minister Mircea Fechet named Sârbu to Romsilva’s governing board.

== Notes ==
Political offices
Preceded by Ioan Avram Mureșan	Minister of Agriculture; 2000–2004	Succeeded by Petre Daea
Preceded by Nicolae Văcăroiu	President of the Romanian Senate; 2008	Succeeded by Mircea Geoană
Preceded by Dacian Cioloș	Minister of Agriculture and Rural Development; 2008–2009	Succeeded by Mihail Dumitru
