= Daciana Sârbu =

Romanian politician (born 1977)

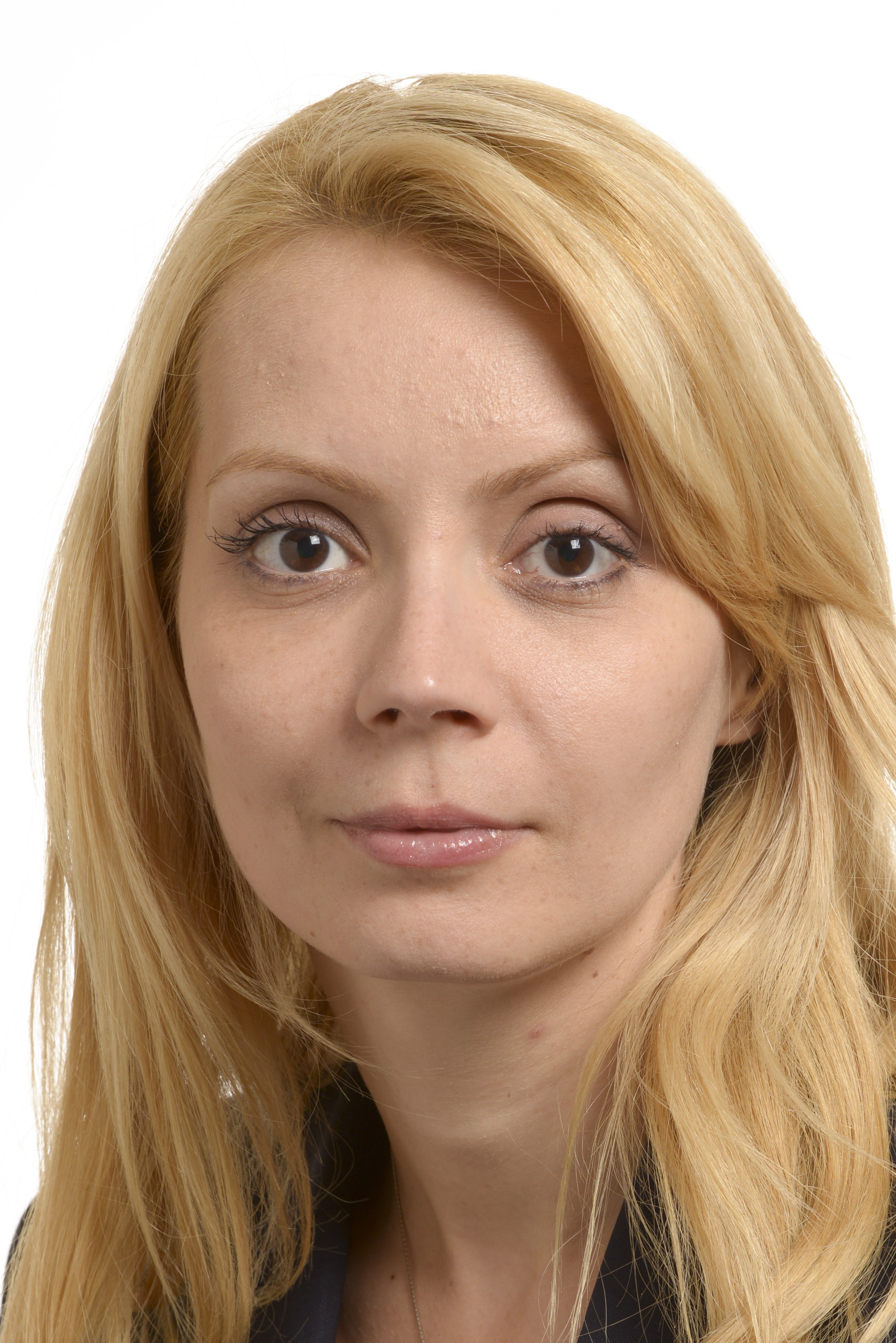
Daciana Sârbu (2014)

Daciana Octavia Sârbu (born 15 January 1977) is a Romanian politician, legal counsellor, and former Member of the European Parliament.

== Political career ==
Affiliated with the Social Democratic Party (PSD), part of the Party of European Socialists, she became a member of the Romanian Chamber of Deputies for Argeș County following the 2004 elections, and became an MEP on 1 January 2007, with the accession of Romania to the European Union.

Born in Arad, Sârbu graduated from Law School at the West University of Timișoara, where she was awarded a Master's Degree in Commercial law. She also graduated from the National College of Defense in 2002, and later worked for a law practice.

In 1996, Sârbu joined the PSD (known as PDSR at the time), and in 2001 became an Adviser for the Controlling Body of the Romanian Premiership in the Năstase cabinet. She withdrew from this office in 2003, and became a State Secretary in the Ministry of Education and Research, later serving as Head of the National Authority for the Youth. In her party, she became one of the leaders of the youth and women's wings, taking part in the International Union of Socialist Youth structures, and attending its Congress of 2004.

In July 2018, she announced that she decided to leave PSD, continuing her mandate in the European Parliament as an independent MEP until February 2019 and then as a PRO Romania member, within the S&D Group.

== Personal life ==
Daciana Sârbu is the daughter of Ilie Sârbu, a PSD member who served as Minister of Agriculture in the Adrian Năstase cabinet and held the same position in the Emil Boc cabinet; he was also President of the Senate in 2008. In October 2006, in China, she quietly wed the former Prime Minister of Romania, Victor Ponta. The couple's relationship had become serious in 2004, after Ponta's son was born. They had a daughter in March 2008 and married in a Romanian Orthodox ceremony in Bucharest's Grădina Icoanei Church that June. The couple divorced in 2024.

== In the European Parliament ==
As an MEP, Sârbu sat on the Committee on the Environment, Public Health and Food Safety (ENVI), whilst also being a member of the Delegation for relations with the United States, a substitute member on the Committee on Fisheries (PECH), Committee on Constitutional Affairs (AFCO) and Delegation for relations with the People's Republic of China (D-CN). At the start of the 2014 legislature, she was elected vice-chair of the ENVI Committee.

=== Environment ===
Sârbu had a longtime involvement in environmental issues and co-authored an important resolution, adopted in 2010 by a large majority of the European Parliament, concerning the general ban on the use of cyanide mining technologies in the EU.

She was a promoter of the Danube Delta, working with several NGOs to bring the EU authorities' attention to this area that needs special funding for protection and development.

=== Agriculture ===
Agriculture was one of her main areas of involvement and she supported the promotion of organic and traditional products, as well as calling for a strategic shift in EU agriculture towards supporting small farms and organic farming. In 2011, as member of the Agriculture Committee, she was the author of a report on the recognition of agriculture as a strategic sector in the context of food security.

=== Health and Children's nutrition ===
One of her main priorities lay with children's nutrition. She asked the European Commission to design a Child Health Strategy, consisting of integrated policies regarding prevention and nutrition. Besides her initiatives in the European Parliament, she has also founded an association – School for Health – which aimed to support parents to learn about healthy food for the benefit of their children, bringing them together with nutrition specialists, physicians and cooks.

In spring 2015, she was a nominee at the MEP Awards in Brussels, being shortlisted for her activity related to Health issues. She had a strong involvement in patients' rights support and in February 2014 she co-hosted in Strasbourg the launch of the European Cancer Patient's Bill of Rights, stating that "Launching the Bill of Rights in the European Parliament on World Cancer Day underlines our will and the commitment of the European Parliament to abolish disparities in cancer care across for the European citizen. In the current socio-economic circumstances in Southern, Eastern and Central Europe, where the public health systems are under constant pressure from austerity measures, cancer patients and their families are the first to feel the impact on their health, finances and quality of life".

She was co-chair of the MEP Interest Group on Brain, Mind and Pain, an initiative of the European Federation of Neurological Associations [EFNA] and Pain Alliance Europe, whose aim was to explore issues of common interest to those affected by neurological and chronic pain disorders, including stigma, quality of life, research and patient involvement.

=== Rapporteur on the cloning of animals for farming purposes ===
She was Parliament's S&D group shadow rapporteur on the cloning of animals for farming purposes and repeatedly stated that EU rules on cloning animals for food must reflect citizens' concerns.

=== Supporting Romanian workers' rights in Europe ===
Politically, she was very active in supporting Romanian workers' rights in Europe, in the context of the rising extremist voices in the EU and especially around the deadline for lifting temporary restrictions on Romanian and Bulgarian workers in the United Kingdom. She published an article in The Parliament Magazine, where she stated: "The fueling of xenophobic fear, spiced up with apocalyptic terminology that conflates migration with conflict and disaster, isn't just factually inaccurate, it is irresponsible and dangerous. It fosters a deeply divisive, and, at times, hysterical debate which risks handing a victory to the extremist political parties which embody such rhetoric in their policies".

In 2015, following a derogatory statement by Nigel Farage against foreign-born doctors working in the UK, Sârbu wrote a letter addressed to several UK medical organisations, asking for their cooperation in defending the image of immigrant doctors and nurses working in the UK: "As a Romanian citizen, I feel even more obliged to protest against such claims, since the insult is also directed at Romanian doctors and nurses who have left their families behind and work tirelessly every day in your country. I know that there is great appreciation in the UK for medical staff from my country, not only since they are the product of a highly regarded medical education system, but also for their consistently good work and integrity. Romanian doctors and nurses working abroad are honest, reliable and exceptionally well-trained".
