= National Identity Bloc in Europe =

National Identity Bloc in Europe Blocul Identităţii Naţionale în Europa
- Founded: 2 April 2017
- Ideology: Romanian nationalism Christian nationalism National conservatism Social conservatism Right-wing populism Euroscepticism
- Political position: Right-wing to far-right
- Member parties: PRM; ND; PRU (former member)
- Chamber of Deputies: 0 / 330
- Senate: 0 / 136
- European Parliament: 0 / 33
- Mayors: 0 / 3,176
- County Councilors: 0 / 1,340
- Local Council Councilors: 33 / 39,900

The National Identity Bloc in Europe (Romanian: Blocul Identităţii Naţionale în Europa), abbreviated to BINE, is a nationalist electoral alliance in Romania currently formed by two political parties: the Greater Romania Party (PRM) and Noua Dreaptă (PND). The United Romania Party (PRU), one of the founding members of the alliance, was part of it until its dissolution in 2019.

== See also ==
- New Generation Party (Romania)
