= United Romania Party =

Romanian political party (2015–2019)

United Romania Party Partidul România Unită
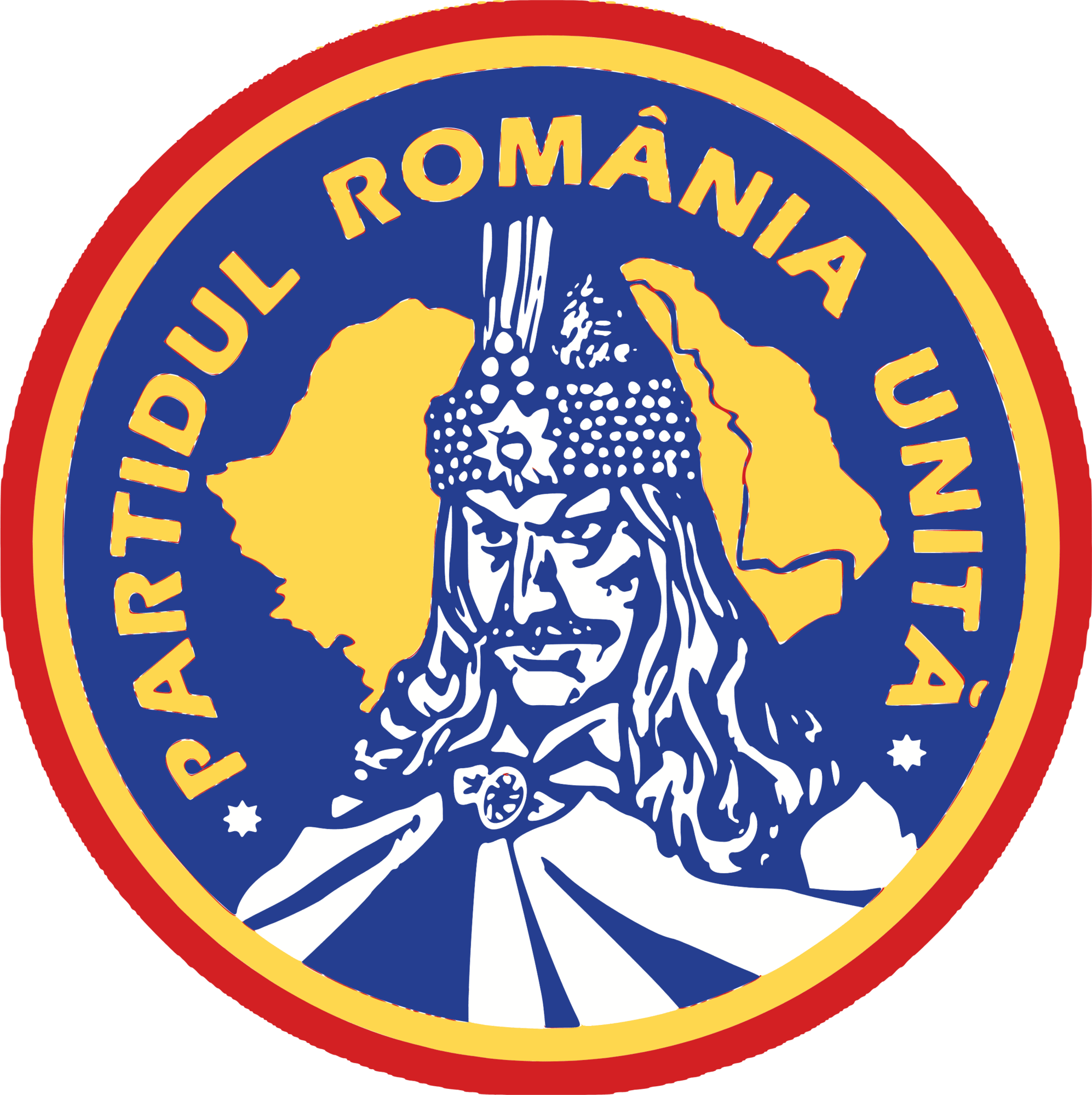
- President: Robert Bugă
- Founded: 23 April 2015
- Dissolved: 11 July 2022
- Split from: Social Democratic Party
- Headquarters: B-dul Nicolae Bălcescu nr. 17-19, Sector 1, Bucharest
- Ideology: Romanian ultranationalism Right-wing populism National conservatism Romanian-Moldovan unionism Anti-Islam; Anti-immigration; Anti-capitalism; Russophilia (alleged)
- Political position: Right-wing to far-right
- National affiliation: National Identity Bloc in Europe
- European affiliation: Alliance for Peace and Freedom
- Colours: Blue, Yellow, Red (Romanian Tricolour)
- Slogan: Noi avem de strâns laolaltă pe toți ai noștri. (We have to gather up together every one of ours.)

Party flag
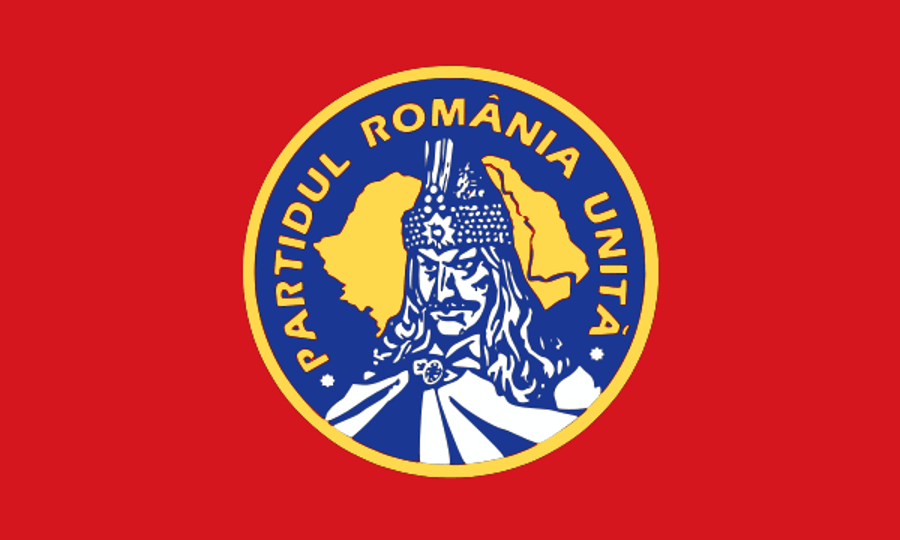

Website
- http://www.partidulromaniaunita.org/

The United Romania Party (Romanian: Partidul România Unită) was a Romanian nationalist political party. It was founded by former members of the Social Democratic Party (PSD), such as Bogdan Diaconu and Greater Romania Party (PRM), like Horațiu Șerb, Vasile Vlasin and Valerian Moraru. The founding members, signatories of the party registration, are: Bogdan Diaconu, Daniel Hogea, Augustin-Florin Hagiu, Horațiu Șerb, Dumitru Badragan, and Dragoș Stancu, based on the civil decision nr. 5 from 7 February 2017, definitive on 25 April 2015.

The party claims to adhere to a "national-democratic" doctrine based on the ideas of Romanian historian and politician Nicolae Iorga and centered on principles of social justice, economic protectionism, Romanian nationalism and anticorruption. According to a resolution adopted in September 2015, it opposes migrant quotas, same-sex marriage, adoption of the euro, Transatlantic Trade and Investment Partnership (TTIP), among others. The party's adversaries consider that it wears a mimetic nationalist stance, former 'PSD-ists and clerks of Voicescu were not and will never be nationalists'. Prominent members (ex. vicepresident Ovidiu Hurduzeu) of the party support the "immediate Romanian withdrawal from the EU and NATO" publishing messages such as 'The Ceaușescu times were better!' on websites. PRU leader Bogdan Diaconu invited former Prime Minister Victor Ponta to join the party and lead it, but he declined. In the 2016 Romanian legislative election, the party received 207,608 votes in the Senate election, and 196,602 in the election to the Chamber of Deputies, not achieving the parliamentary status.

== Self-characterization ==
The United Romania Party characterizes itself as follows:

We are a young team that believes in Romania and its values and which proposes an alternative to the entire political class after 1990. Our ideals are of a Strong and United Romania, respecting rights for every Romanian citizen.

== Party criticism ==
In July 2016, Daniel Ghiță, kickboxing world champion, left the party, disagreeing with the party president at the time, Bogdan Diaconu, stating that he does not follow the principles he promotes.

PRU was nicknamed by some Romanian websites as Sebastian Ghiță's party.

== Electoral history ==
=== Legislative elections ===
Election	Chamber			Senate			Position	Aftermath
Election	Votes	%	Seats	Votes	%	Seats	Position	Aftermath
2016	196,397	2.79	0 / 329	207,977	2.95	0 / 136	7th	Extra-parliamentary opposition to PSD-ALDE government (2017–2019)
2016	196,397	2.79	0 / 329	207,977	2.95	0 / 136	7th	Extra-parliamentary opposition to PSD minority government (2019)
2016	196,397	2.79	0 / 329	207,977	2.95	0 / 136	7th	Extra-parliamentary opposition to PNL minority government (2019–2020)

=== European elections ===
Election	Votes	Percentage	MEPs	Position	EU Party	EP Group
2019	51,787	0.57%	0 / 33	13th	APF	—
