= Voicu =

Voicu is mostly a Romanian surname derived from Slavic Vojko. Notable people with this surname include:

- Adrian Voicu (born 1970), Romanian writer
- Adrian Voicu (born 1992), Romanian footballer
- Andreea Voicu (born 1996), Romanian footballer
- Bogdan Voicu (born 1981), Romanian rugby player
- Carmen Voicu-Jagodzinsky (née Voicu; born 1981), Romanian chess master
- Cătălin Voicu (born 1965), Romanian politician
- Elena Voicu (born 1990), Romanian handballer
- Gheorghe Voicu (born 1950), Romanian former biathlete
- Ioana Voicu (born 1972), Romanian former diver
- Ion Voicu (1923–1997), Romanian violinist and conductor
- Ion Voicu (footballer) (born 1975), Romanian footballer
- Ionuț Voicu (born 1984), Romanian footballer
- Irinel Voicu (born 1977), Romanian footballer
- Mădălin Voicu (born 1952), Romanian musician and politician
- Mircea Voicu (born 1980), Romanian footballer
- Nicolae Voicu (born 1955), Romanian middle-distance runner
- Pavel Voicu (born 1973), Moldovan politician

Voicu is also the given name attributed by the Romanian historiography to the father of John Hunyadi, who is called "Voyk" in Latin-language 15th century documents.

== See also ==
- Voina (disambiguation)
- Voinea
- Voineasa (disambiguation)
- Voinești (disambiguation)
