= Voineasa =

Voineasa may refer to several places in Romania:

- Voineasa, Olt, a commune in Olt County
- Voineasa, Vâlcea, a commune in Vâlcea County

== See also ==
- Voina (disambiguation)
- Voicu, a surname
- Voinea, a surname
- Voinești (disambiguation)
