= Ministry of Relations with the Parliament (Romania) =

Government ministry of Romania

- Incumbent; Victor Ponta (PSD) since 22 December 2008

The Ministry of Relations with the Parliament of Romania (Romanian: Ministerul pentru Relaţia cu Parlamentul) was one of the ministries of the Government of Romania.

The Ministry was dissolved on 23 December 2009.
