= Voinești =

Voineşti may refer to several places in Romania:

- Voinești, Dâmbovița, a commune in Dâmboviţa County
- Voinești, Iași, a commune in Iași County
- Voinești, Vaslui, a commune in Vaslui County
- Voinești, a village in Lerești Commune, Argeș County
- Voinești, a village in Măxineni Commune, Brăila County
- Voinești, a village in Vulturești Commune, Vaslui County
- Voinești (river), a tributary of the Bahlui in Iași County

== See also ==
- Voina (disambiguation)
- Voicu, a surname
- Voinea, a surname
- Voineasa (disambiguation)
