= Voina (disambiguation) =

Voina may refer to:

- Voina, a Russian street-art group known for their provocative and politically charged works of performance art
- Voina, a Russian film "Война", Russian for war

== Family name ==
- Radu Voina (born 1950), Romanian handball player and head coach
- Gheorghe Vasiliu-Voina (1887–1960) Romanian politician and diplomat, mayor of Iași

== See also ==
- Voicu
- Voinea
- Voineasa (disambiguation)
- Voinești (disambiguation)
