= Victor Ponta =

Prime Minister of Romania from 2012 to 2015

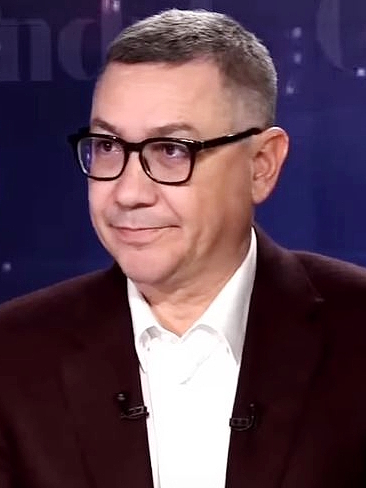
- Ponta in 2025

Prime Minister of Romania
- In office 10 August 2015 – 5 November 2015
- President: Klaus Iohannis
- Deputy: Gabriel Oprea
- Preceded by: Gabriel Oprea (Acting)
- Succeeded by: Sorin Cîmpeanu (acting)
- In office 9 July 2015 – 29 July 2015
- President: Klaus Iohannis
- Deputy: Gabriel Oprea
- Preceded by: Gabriel Oprea (Acting)
- Succeeded by: Gabriel Oprea (acting)
- In office 7 May 2012 – 22 June 2015
- President: Traian Băsescu; Crin Antonescu (Acting); Traian Băsescu; Klaus Iohannis
- Deputy: Gabriel Oprea
- Preceded by: Mihai Răzvan Ungureanu
- Succeeded by: Gabriel Oprea (acting)

Member of the Chamber of Deputies
- Incumbent
- Assumed office 20 December 2024
- Constituency: Dâmbovița County
- In office 17 December 2004 – 20 December 2020
- Constituency: Gorj County

Minister of Parliamentary Relations
- In office 22 December 2008 – 1 October 2009
- Prime Minister: Emil Boc
- Preceded by: Mihai Voicu
- Succeeded by: Sorina-Luminița Plăcintă (acting)

President of PRO Romania
- In office 3 September 2017 – 2024
- Preceded by: Office established

President of the Social Democratic Party (Note: Ponta was on leave between 24 June and 9 July 2015, during which time Rovana Plumb served as acting leader.)
- In office 21 February 2010 – 12 July 2015
- Preceded by: Mircea Geoană
- Succeeded by: Rovana Plumb (acting)

President of the Social Democratic Youth
- In office November 2002 – November 2006

Personal details
- Born: Victor-Viorel Ponta; 20 September 1972 (age 54) Bucharest, Romania
- Citizenship: Romania; Serbia
- Party: Independent (since 2025)
- Other political affiliations: Social Democratic (2002–17; 2024–25); Social Liberal Union (2011–14); PRO Romania (2017–24); Romania First (2025–present)
- Spouse(s): Roxana Ponta (m. 1998; div. 2006) Daciana Sârbu (m. 2006; div. 2024)
- Children: 3
- Relatives: Ilie Sârbu (fmr. father-in-law)
- Education: University of Bucharest; Carol I National Defence University
- Website: victorponta.ro

Victor Viorel Ponta (Note: Romanian pronunciation: [ˈviktor vi.oˈrel ˈponta]) (born 20 September 1972) is a Romanian politician and jurist who served as Prime Minister of Romania from 2012 to 2015. He was president of the Social Democratic Party (PSD) from 2010 to 2015, and joint leader (2012–2014) of the then-governing Social Liberal Union (USL), an alliance with the National Liberal Party (PNL). Ponta was a member of the Romanian Chamber of Deputies for Gorj County from 2004 to 2020, and was returned to a Dâmbovița County seat in 2024.

In the Emil Boc cabinet, Ponta was Minister-Delegate for Relations with Parliament from 2008 to 2009. He began his time as head of government with a victory for his alliance in local elections, as well as criticism from civil society after several prominent Băsescu-associated figures in government-funded culture and history institutes were removed or resigned from their posts. Eventually, a political crisis broke out with the replacement of the heads of each legislative chamber and an attempt to dismiss Băsescu – an effort that ultimately failed when the subsequent impeachment referendum was invalidated by the Constitutional Court due to low turnout. Meanwhile, Ponta was the subject of controversy due to allegations of plagiarism in his doctoral thesis. Seven months after gaining office, Ponta helped lead the USL to a decisive victory in parliamentary elections, prompting his appointment to a full four-year term as premier. A little over a year later, the USL fell apart and Ponta formed a new cabinet with the Democratic Alliance of Hungarians in Romania (UDMR) as coalition partners.

A finalist in the November 2014 presidential election, Ponta lost to PNL candidate Klaus Iohannis. The following month, the UDMR quit government, prompting Ponta to form a fourth cabinet, with the Conservative Party (PC) and the Liberal Reformist Party (PLR) as junior partners. The cabinet was in office for slightly less than a year, resigning in the wake of the Colectiv nightclub fire.

== Life and career ==
=== Beginnings, election to parliament and ministerial post ===
According to Ponta, his family, originally called Ponte, originated in Trieste, now in Italy, and reached Transylvania around the turn of the 20th century in order to help build a road from Pecica to Nădlac commissioned by the Austro-Hungarian authorities. He has also claimed ancestry from the village of Moscopole located in Albania, accounting for the Aromanian descent on his maternal side. Ponta was born in Bucharest, completing secondary studies in 1991 at the city's Ion Neculce High School. In 1995, he graduated from the University of Bucharest's Law faculty. He received a degree from the Carol I National Defence University in 2002, and in 2003 received a doctorate in Criminal Law from the University of Bucharest and a master's degree in Political Management from the Social Democratic Institute. He has written several books in his field, including one on the International Criminal Court, the subject of his doctoral thesis. Between 1996 and 1998, and since 2002, he has taught Criminal Law at the Romanian-American University. From 1995 to 1998, Ponta worked as a prosecutor handling cases at the Sector 1 courthouse. From 1998 to 2001, he was a prosecutor at the Supreme Court of Justice in the anti-corruption division, in particular dealing with economic and financial crimes. From 2000 to 2001, he coordinated the Bureau for Combating Money Laundering.

In April 2002, Cristian Panait, a prosecutor involved in cases connected to then-Prime Minister Adrian Năstase, fell from the third-floor window of his home. He died the following day, and the incident was ruled a suicide a day later. The following January, his aunt filed suit to contest the fact that no charges were filed, claiming his superiors pushed him toward suicide. The complained also mentioned Panait's fellow prosecutor Ponta, claiming the former had told her, "that dog Victor Ponta did me in". She also said the two had been friends until Panait accused Ponta of influence peddling due to what he saw as the latter's involvement with underworld figures. In reply, Ponta mentioned he had called for the investigation into Panait's death to be reopened, stating the two had not met for some six months before that event, and that there had been no breach in their friendship. Prior to the 2012 legislative election, opposition campaigner Adriean Videanu charged that Ponta's "blackmail" and "threats" had pushed Panait to kill himself.

From 2001 to 2004, Ponta held the rank of Secretary of State as head of the government's Control Department. In 2006, a civil servant at the Ministry of Education (who was in an ongoing feud with Ponta) charged that Ponta, while holding this office, covered up corrupt activities undertaken by former minister Hildegard Puwak, who was cleared of wrongdoing in a report issued by Ponta. Additionally, he helped uncover cases of fraudulent use of Phare funds. In 2001 he also joined the supervisory council of the Authority for State Assets Recovery, and that year he was part of a special committee investigating penal infractions committed by members of the government. In March 2004, he became Minister-Delegate for Control of International Grant Programmes Implementation and for Monitoring the Application of the Acquis Communautaire. A PSD member by 2002, he was from July to November of that year head of the Interim National Council of the Social Democratic Youth (TSD). That October, he became a member of the PSD's national council, and joined its executive bureau the following month, when he also became president of the TSD, remaining as such for four years. In 2005, he became a vice president of Ecosy, while he has been a vice president of the PSD since December 2006. At the 2004 election, Ponta won a seat in the Chamber of Deputies, where he served as both secretary and vice president of its permanent bureau; he was re-elected in 2008. That December, he became a minister in the incoming Boc cabinet.

Upon winning confirmation, Ponta pledged to reduce the number of emergency ordinances issued by the government and to assist Parliament in exercising control over the cabinet. Among his activities was to help steer a new civil and penal code through Parliament. Among the more controversial provisions in these codes that Ponta defended (both as minister and as head of the parliamentary committee drafting the legislation) were one presuming that any defensive act done at night at home would be considered legitimate self-defence; and one banning therapeutic abortions after the 24th week of pregnancy, which received sharp criticism from several NGOs. Ponta, nicknamed "Little Titulescu" by Năstase, has been known to criticise both members of his own party, commenting that then-mayor of Sector 5 Marian Vanghelie (known for his gaffes) "is such a philosopher that not even I can understand him"; and of the PDL, remarking, after the two parties had entered a governing coalition, that his Gorj County parliamentary colleagues are "parrots, liars and dimwits". Together with his PSD colleagues, Ponta resigned from the cabinet on 1 October 2009, in protest at the dismissal of vice prime minister and Interior Minister Dan Nica.

=== Social Democratic leadership ===
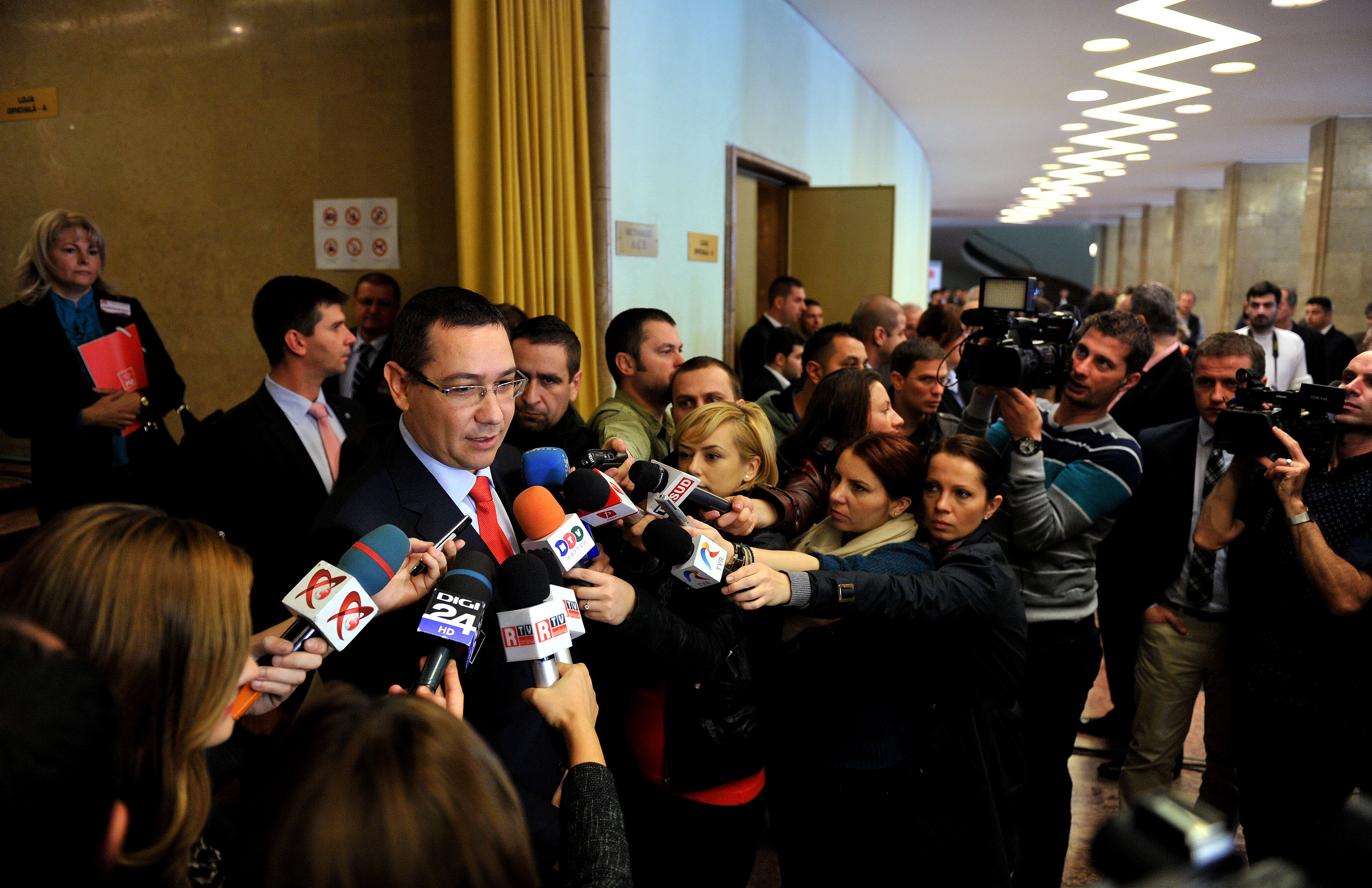
Ponta at an annual meeting of the PSD, which he led from 2010 to 2015

In February 2010, he was elected PSD president at a party congress, defeating incumbent Mircea Geoană, who had narrowly lost a bid to become President of Romania several months earlier. The feud between Geoană and Ponta continued beyond the latter's election as party leader; for instance, six months later, Ponta alleged that "moguls" such as Sorin Ovidiu Vântu had total control over PSD decision-making during Geoană's tenure, a charge the latter denied and attributed to a hidden desire of Ponta's to see him ejected from the post of Senate President. In November 2011, Ponta led a successful effort to remove Geoană both from the PSD and from the Senate leadership.

In February 2011, he and Crin Antonescu, head of the National Liberal Party (PNL), formed the Social Liberal Union (USL), a political alliance in opposition to the governing Democratic Liberal Party (PD-L). In August 2012, he was elected a vice president of the Socialist International. Ponta resigned the party leadership in July 2015, amidst an ongoing corruption investigation.

=== As Prime Minister ===
==== Appointment and early moves ====
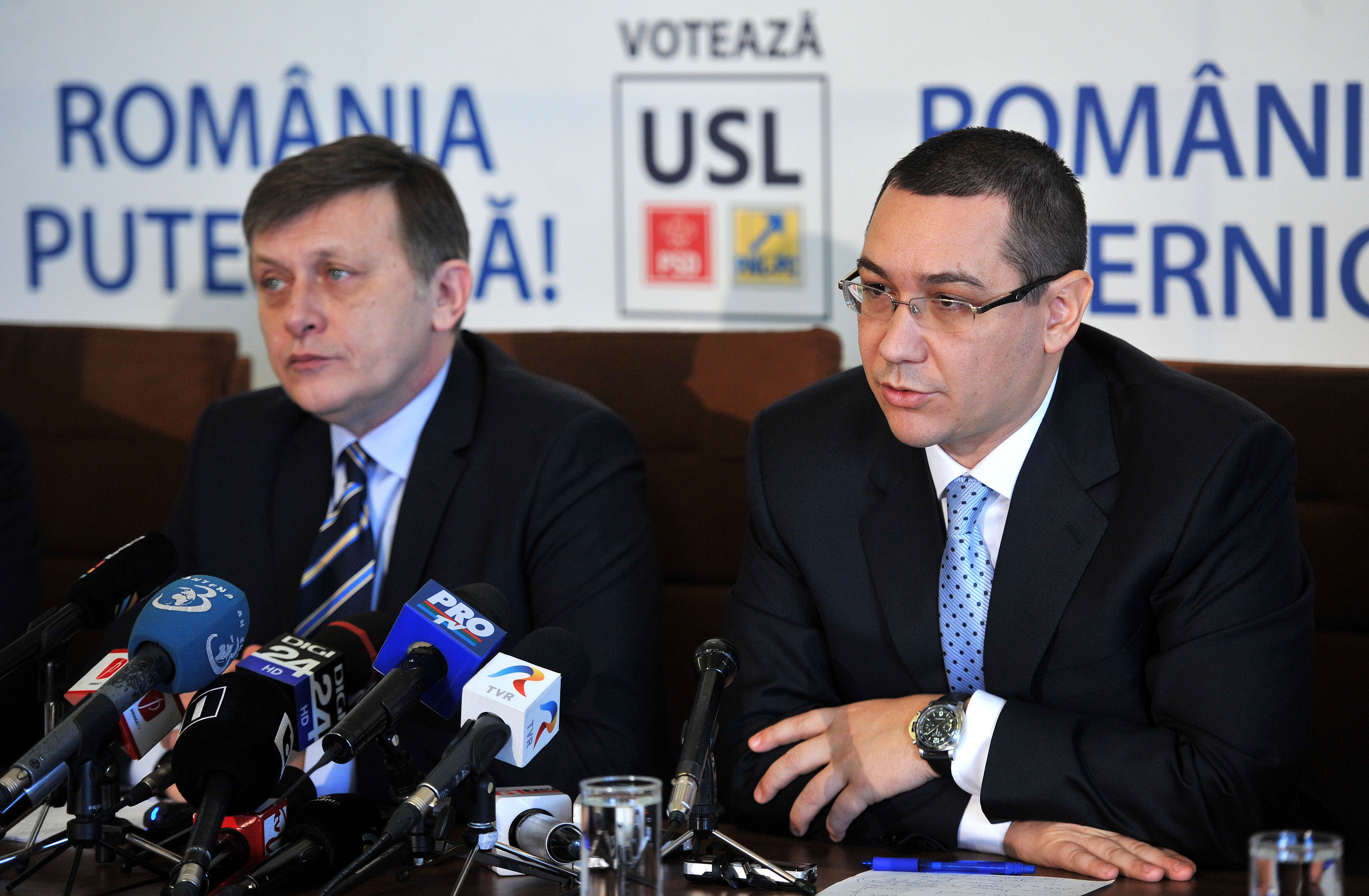
Ponta with PNL chief Crin Antonescu while the duo headed the Social Liberal Union (USL)

In April 2012, after the government of Mihai Răzvan Ungureanu fell due to the passage of a motion of no confidence, President Traian Băsescu designated Ponta as prime minister. His cabinet, including ministers from the PSD, the PNL, independents and one from the Conservative Party (PC), received parliamentary approval the following month, and Ponta thus became prime minister. Upon taking office in the midst of a continent-wide recession, he vowed to promote economic growth and job creation solely from within the private sector, but also to increase public-sector salaries. In June, the USL came in first overall at the local election; Ponta singled out the alliance's victory in Bucharest as a "historic moment".

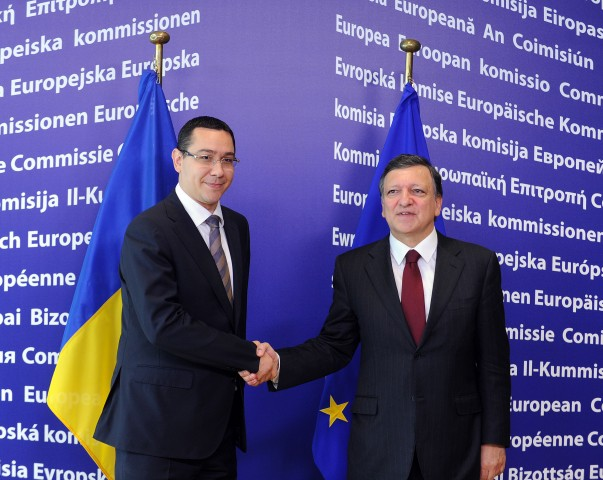
Ponta meeting with European Commission President José Manuel Barroso

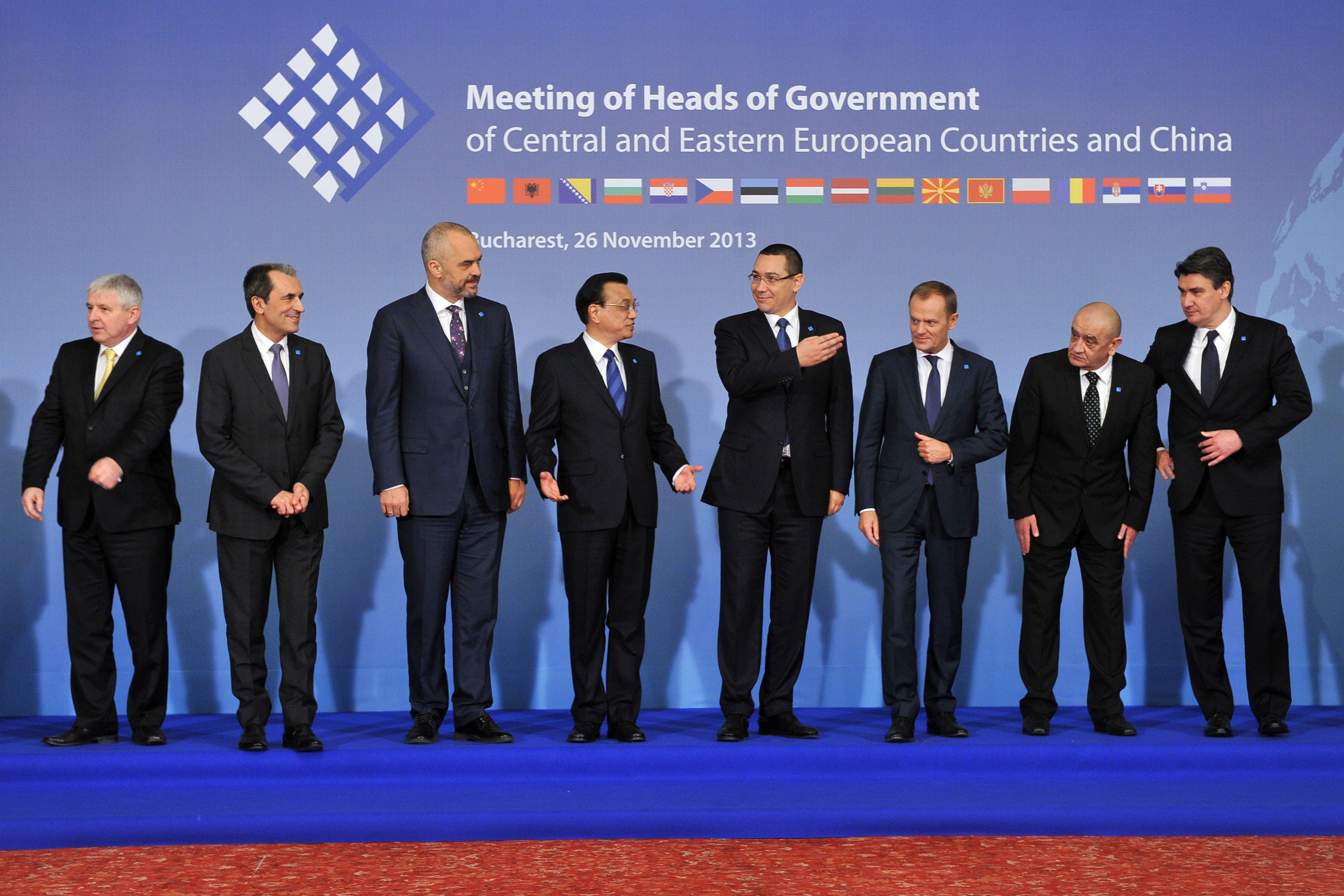
Ponta (fifth from left) in Bucharest in November 2013, meeting heads of government from Central and Eastern Europe, and China

In the opening weeks of his mandate, Ponta became involved in several controversies. His government transferred oversight of the Romanian Cultural Institute from the presidency to the Parliament, claiming this would increase transparency. However, the move drew criticism from its head, Horia-Roman Patapievici, as well as from other artists and cultural figures who feared the institute would become politicized. His steps to change the leadership of Romanian Television provoked dissension from many of the broadcaster's employees, who charged the government with "destroying" public television. He pushed through a new electoral law establishing a first-past-the-post voting system, but this was rejected by the Constitutional Court. A dispute with Băsescu arose over who would represent Romania at the European Council, with the court ruling in the latter's favour, although Ponta attended the subsequent council nevertheless.

==== Plagiarism controversy ====
A month into his term as premier, an article published in Nature reported that an anonymous source had charged Ponta with plagiarising over half his doctoral thesis, claims that were later reiterated by the Frankfurter Allgemeine Zeitung. Ponta admitted that the referencing system used by his thesis did not provide clear attribution of its sources, but rejected the allegations of plagiarism. Dumitru Diaconu, a law professor and author supposedly plagiarised by Ponta's thesis, and who also authored a foreword for the published edition of the thesis, declared he was not aware of plagiarism and did not intend to pursue the accusations. A session of a committee charged with validating academic titles analysed the thesis and decided with a unanimous vote of members present that Ponta had committed copy and paste plagiarism, subsequently requesting the withdrawal of Ponta's doctoral title. In response, interim Education Minister Liviu Pop (PSD) contested the committee's jurisdiction and dismissed the findings, citing the lack of a quorum. The minister had already signed an order reorganising the committee the previous day, but, due to technical reasons, the order came into effect during the very session analysing the thesis.

Another committee, subordinated to the Education Ministry, later found that Ponta did not commit plagiarism. A third committee, convoked by the University of Bucharest and consisting of ten members, each from a different department, unanimously found that Ponta had indeed deliberately plagiarised at least a third of his thesis. Ponta replied that the committee was an "ad-hoc" one designed especially for him, and that the decision was a "political" one. In August 2012, three individuals filed suit against Ponta, asking prosecutors to open a legal case against him for intellectual fraud. The latter opted against proceeding, the former appealed, and in March 2014, the High Court of Cassation and Justice rejected their appeal. In December 2014, citing the controversy surrounding his thesis, asked that the University of Bucharest withdraw his doctoral title. The university responded that it would comply with his request. Later that month, his government adopted an ordinance allowing individuals to renounce academic diplomas and titles; the move was criticised by the student federation ANOSR. In summer 2016, a revamped committee decided, with 34 votes in favour and one abstention, that Ponta did indeed plagiarise his thesis, prompting Education Minister Mircea Dumitru to sign an order withdrawing his title of doctor.

Until the controversy began and his official curriculum vitae was modified, he claimed in the document to have received a master's degree in International Criminal Law from the University of Catania in 2000. That institution's rector replied to an enquiry by stating an internal verification had revealed Ponta was never at the University of Catania. In turn, Ponta stated that he took a course there and received a diploma.

==== Political crisis and parliamentary election ====
Beginning in July 2012, Ponta found himself at the heart of a political crisis. This culminated in Băsescu's suspension from office by Parliament, an action strongly promoted by Ponta, and which triggered an unsuccessful referendum on impeaching Băsescu.

Following the USL victory at the December 2012 parliamentary election, including Ponta winning 61% of the vote in his own seat, where he was challenged by Dan Diaconescu, Băsescu named Ponta to another term as premier. Subsequently, the two signed a cooperation accord, while tensions with the PNL deepened. These grew especially apparent in April 2013, when Ponta, as interim Justice Minister, named Laura Codruța Kövesi to head the National Anticorruption Directorate (DNA) in spite of objections from the PNL, who viewed her as a Băsescu ally. In February 2014, the PNL left the government, marking the end of the USL, the precipitating motive being Ponta's refusal to name Klaus Iohannis as deputy prime minister. Ponta, by now head of a Social Democratic Union (USD) involving his party, the National Union for the Progress of Romania (UNPR) and the PC, went on to form a new government with the Democratic Union of Hungarians in Romania (UDMR). During Ponta's first two years in office, his cabinets significantly raised the salaries of public-sector employees, which Băsescu and his allies had cut by 25% in 2010. At the same time, he raised or introduced a number of taxes and fees, one of the most widely-felt being an increase in the fuel tax. He confronted two environmentally sensitive issues: the Roșia Montană Project, which he initially opposed but later became more open to the idea; and shale gas extraction through fracking, which he first backed but then shifted to preferring exploitation of natural gas from the Black Sea.

==== Presidential candidacy, aftermath and resignation ====
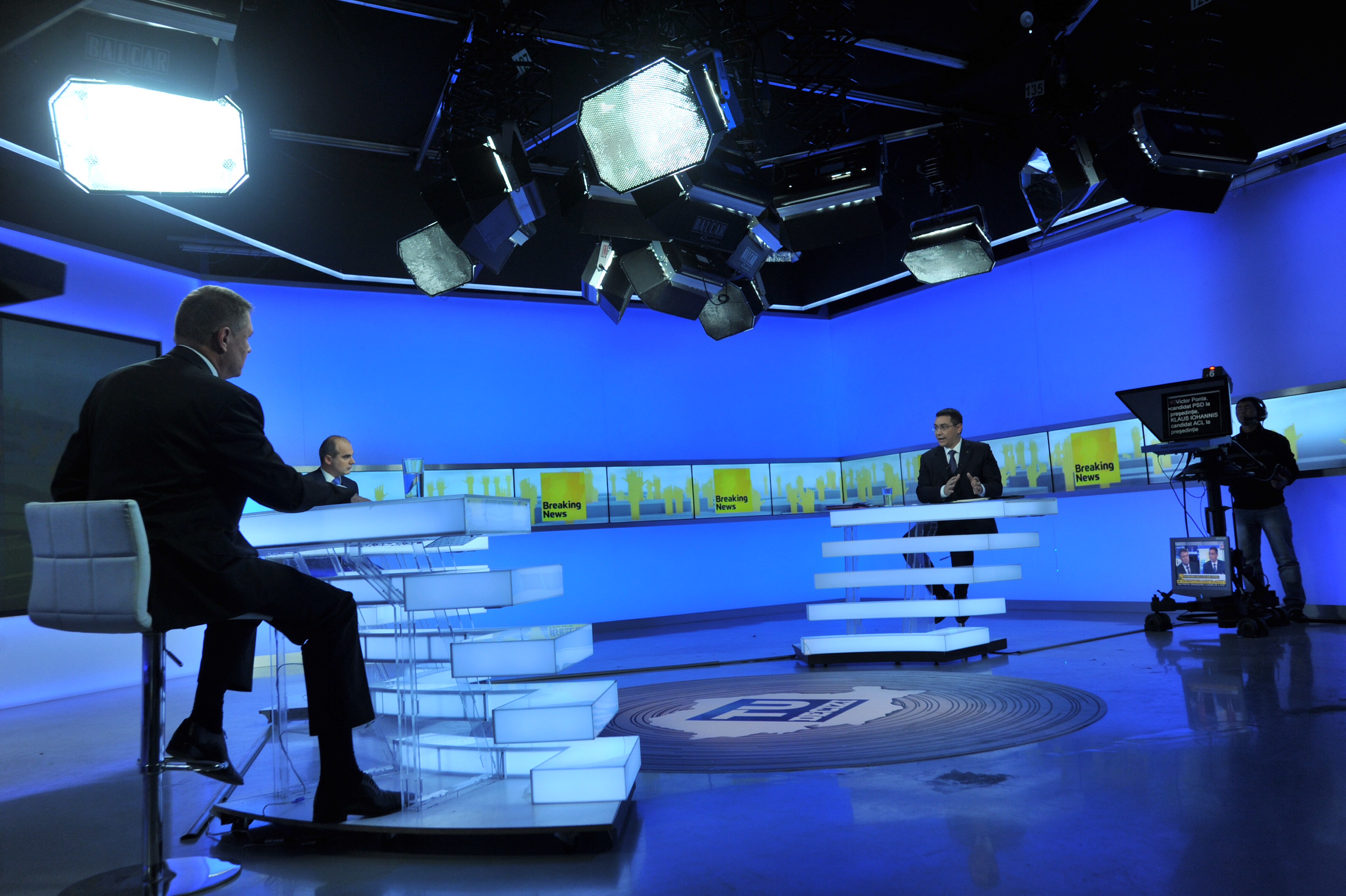
Ponta with his rival, Klaus Iohannis, in a debate hosted by Realitatea TV on 11 November 2014

In late July 2014, Ponta launched his candidacy for the upcoming presidential race, at the same time beginning to attack his chief rival, Iohannis. He placed first in the election's first round, with 40.4% of the vote, and faced Iohannis in the runoff. In the second round, he was defeated by Iohannis on a 54.5%-45.5% margin. Reportedly, an important factor in his defeat was the poor organisation of the election's first round among the Romanian diaspora. This voting bloc and its domestic sympathisers were galvanised to turn out against Ponta in the second round. The following month, the UDMR quit the government, and Ponta subsequently formed his fourth cabinet, in which he also included two ministers apiece from the PC and the Liberal Reformist Party (PLR).

In June 2015, the DNA opened a criminal investigation against Ponta, alleging forgery, complicity in tax evasion and money laundering allegedly committed while he was a lawyer; and a conflict of interest for naming former business associate Dan Șova to several positions while prime minister. Iohannis called on Ponta to resign, which the latter refused to do. Subsequently, and in accord with his expressed wishes, the Chamber rejected the prosecutorial request to lift his immunity; most of those siding with him came from the PSD, as well as its allies (UNPR, PC and PLR), and the ethnic minorities parties. Later that month, Ponta left for Turkey to undergo knee surgery; during his recovery, Gabriel Oprea took over as interim prime minister, serving until Ponta's return in early July. Days later, he resigned as PSD president, citing a desire to safeguard the party's image while he faces criminal charges; Rovana Plumb took over on an interim basis. The DNA then formally indicted Ponta, initiating procedures to freeze a part of his assets. From the end of July until early August, Ponta took another leave of absence for rest purposes, with Oprea again stepping in on a temporary basis. The case was sent to trial in September; Ponta was charged along with four other defendants, including Șova.

In late October 2015, a deadly nightclub fire sparked ample street protests. Within several days, these had swelled to over 25,000 participants in Bucharest alone. Among the demands voiced was the resignation of Ponta, tied within the protesters' ranks to corruption and official indifference. Bowing to pressure, he resigned, citing the "legitimate anger" of the public the "desire to place responsibility at higher levels" than the nightclub owners, and the hope that the expectations of the demonstrators had been met. A technocratic cabinet headed by Dacian Cioloș took office two weeks later; Ponta himself was absent from the confirmation vote. Although courted by the United Romania Party ahead of the 2016 parliamentary election, he remained a PSD member. At the election, Ponta retained his seat in the Chamber.

After Aleksandar Vučić became President of Serbia in May 2017, Ponta was given Serbian citizenship. Ponta said he received this status because of his government's response to the 2014 Southeast Europe floods. Around the same time, it emerged that his friend Sebastian Ghiță, a fugitive politician, was hiding in Serbia. In June 2017, he was named secretary general in the government of Sorin Grindeanu, with ministerial rank. In so doing, he was automatically expelled from the PSD, which had agreed to apply this penalty to any party member agreeing to serve under Grindeanu. Shortly after he took on the post, the government was ousted in a no-confidence vote.

=== Comeback efforts ===
In May 2018, the High Court acquitted Ponta of corruption charges dating back to his work as a lawyer in 2007–2008. Later that month, he announced that 11 members of parliament were part of PRO Romania, a political party which he had launched the previous September. Introducing the new party, he described it as a center-left one, aimed at replacing the country's "mediocre, uncultured and incapable" elites with competent professionals.

In the May 2019 European Parliament election, PRO Romania won two seats. Shortly thereafter, the party held 24 seats in the Romanian parliament, nearly all the result of floor crossing from the governing PSD. Due to the latter party's precarious position, Ponta was able to exert pressure for various demands, in exchange for opposing a no-confidence motion. He eventually embraced such a motion, helping to bring down the Viorica Dăncilă cabinet that October. At the 2020 parliamentary election, PRO Romania failed to win any seats, prompting Ponta to announce his withdrawal from politics for the foreseeable future. In 2024, Ponta rejoined the PSD, winning a Dâmbovița County Chamber seat in the parliamentary election.

Three months later, he quit the PSD, citing disagreement with its decision to back Antonescu at the upcoming presidential election. In March 2025, Ponta launched his independent campaign for that election, emphasizing nationalist themes. He finished in fourth place, winning 13% of the vote, subsequently launching the Romania First political platform.

== Personal life ==
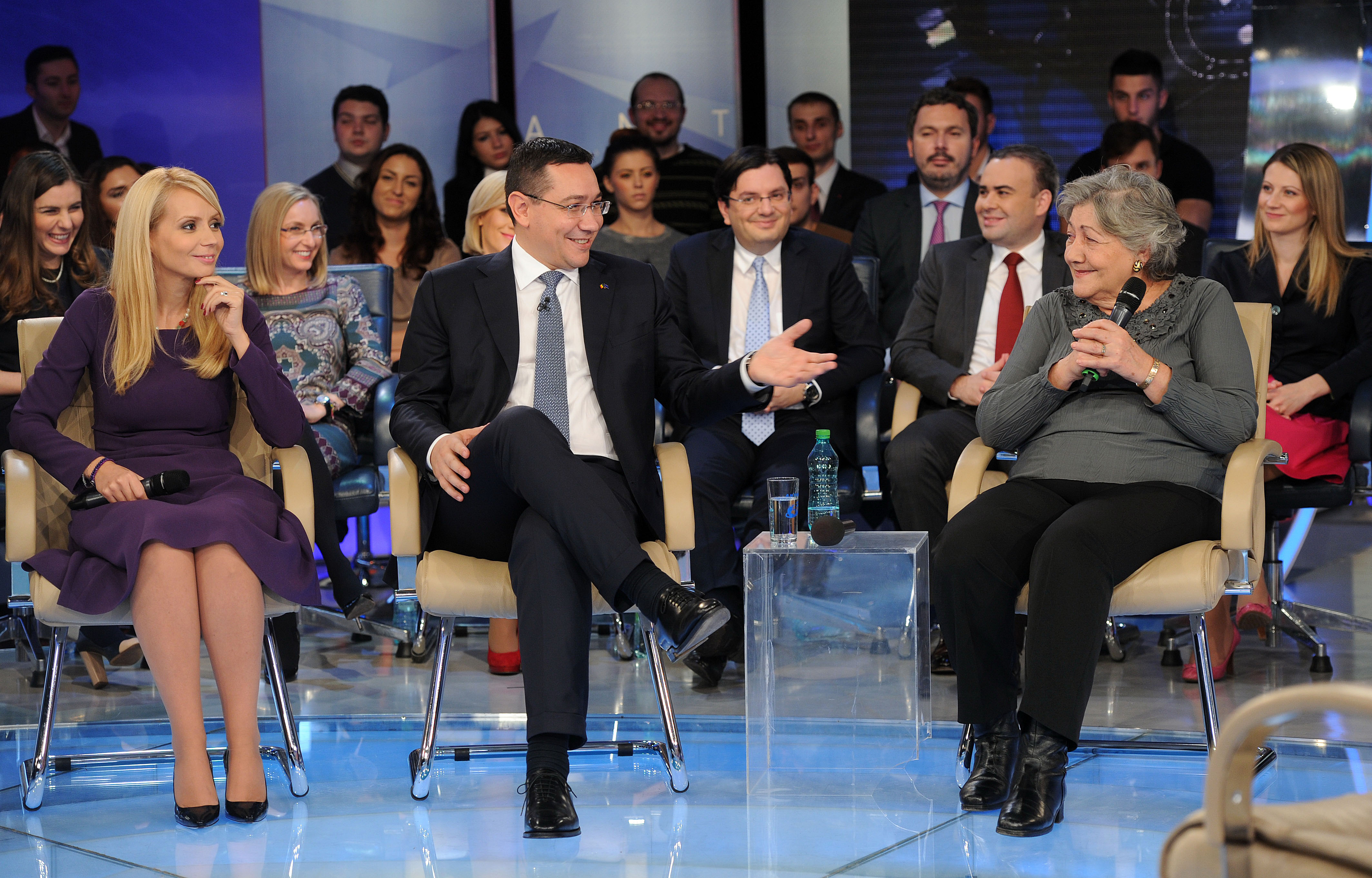
Ponta with his mother, Cornelia Naum (right) and wife, Daciana Sârbu (left) in November 2014

Ponta and his first wife Roxana, a high school sweetheart, have one son; they were married in 1998 and divorced in 2006. That October, in China, he quietly wed Daciana Sârbu, a future Member of the European Parliament and the daughter of Ponta's Boc cabinet colleague Ilie Sârbu. The couple's relationship had become serious in 2004, after Ponta's son was born; they had a daughter in March 2008 and married in a Romanian Orthodox ceremony in the church in Bucharest's Grădina Icoanei that June. In 2020, the couple adopted a 6-year-old girl. They divorced in 2024.

Ponta is the winner of the 1989 youth national championship in basketball, where he played for CSA Steaua București; and of the 2008 Dacia Logan Cup, where he was a co-pilot. In addition, he is an avowed supporter of FC Steaua București football club. He was made a knight of the National Order for Faithful Service in 2002, and in 2004 received the Order of the Star of Italian Solidarity.

== Publications ==
- Scurt istoric al justiției penale internaționale, R. A. Monitorul Oficial, Bucharest, 2001
- Drept Penal – Partea generală. Note de curs, Ed. Lumina Lex, Bucharest, 2004
- Curtea Penală Internațională, Ed. Lumina Lex, Bucharest, 2004
- Noi provocări ale secolului XXI – Constituția europeană. Importanță, efecte și natură juridică, Ed. Arhiepiscopia Tomisului, 2005, Constanța
- Drept penal. Partea generală, Ed. Hamangiu, Bucharest, 2006

== Electoral history ==
=== Presidential elections ===
| Election | Affiliation | First round | | | Second round | | |
| Election | Affiliation | Votes | Percentage | Position | Votes | Percentage | Position |
|---|---|---|---|---|---|---|---|
| 2014 | PSD-UNPR-PC Alliance | 3,836,093 | 40.4% | 1st | 5,264,383 | 45.6% | 2nd |
| 2025 | Independent | 1,230,164 | 13.04% | 4th | Did not qualify | | |

== See also ==
- First Ponta cabinet
- Second Ponta cabinet
- Third Ponta Cabinet
- Fourth Ponta Cabinet

== Notes ==
Political offices
| Preceded by Mihai Voicu | Minister of Parliamentary Relations; 2008–2009 | Succeeded by Sorina-Luminița Plăcintă; Acting |
| Preceded by Mihai Răzvan Ungureanu | Prime Minister of Romania; 2012–2015 | Succeeded by Sorin Cîmpeanu; Acting |
Party political offices
| Preceded by Mircea Geoană | Leader of the Social Democratic Party; 2010–2015 | Succeeded by Rovana Plumb; Acting |
