= Liviu Voinea =

Romanian economist

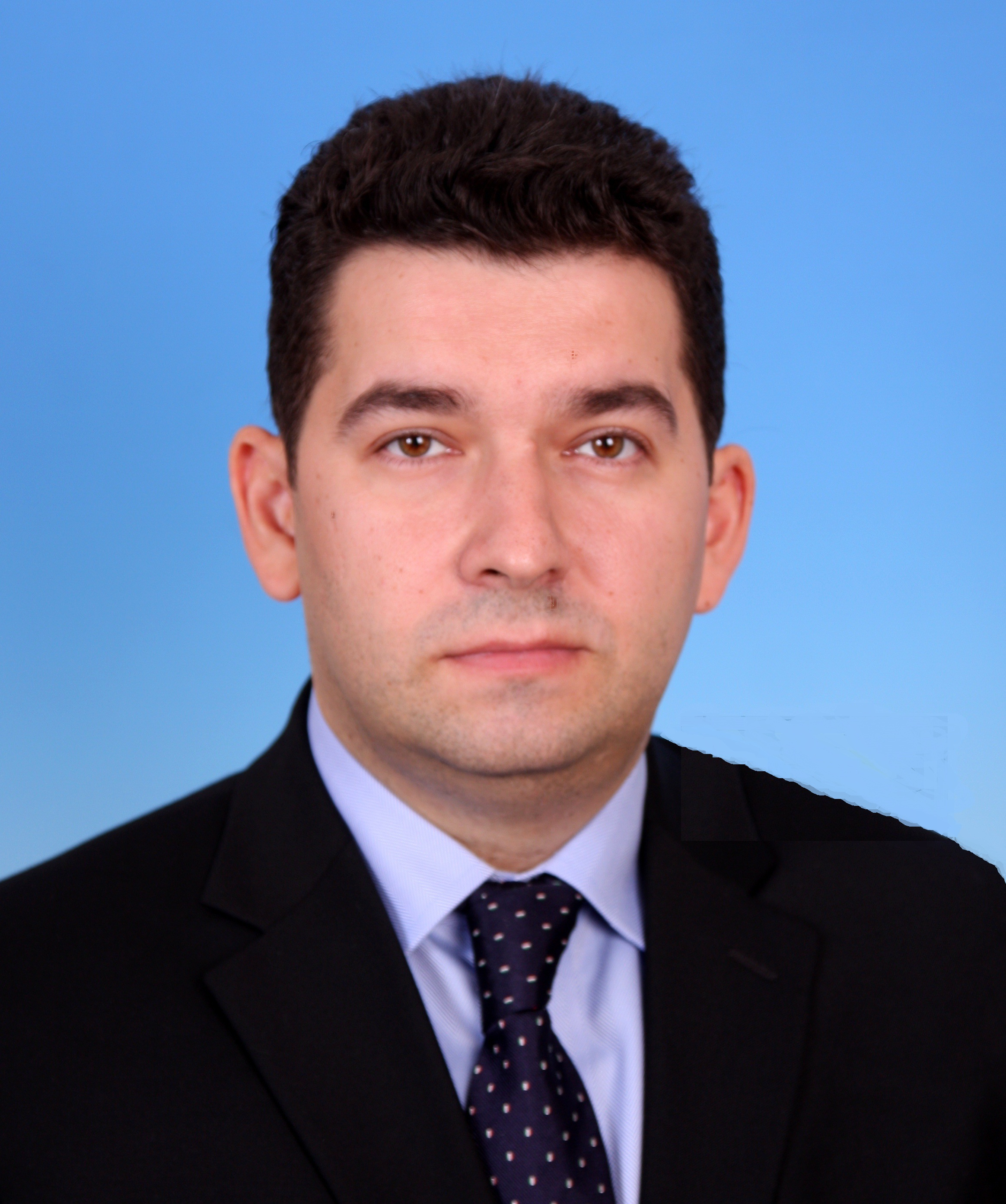

Professor of International Economics and Macroeconomics at the Academy of Economic Studies
- Incumbent
- Assumed office 2013

Alternate Executive Director, World Bank
- In office 1 March 2024 – 31 January 2026

Romania’s representative at the International Monetary Fund and Senior Advisor to the IMF Executive Director
- In office 26 August 2019 – 29 August 2023

Deputy Governor, National Bank of Romania
- In office October 2014 – 26 August 2019

Minister Delegate for Budget, Ministry of Public Finance
- In office 21 December 2012 – 27 August 2014

Deputy Minister of Public Finance
- In office 16 May 2012 – 21 December 2012

Liviu Voinea (born 26 June 1975) is a professor of International Economics and Macroeconomics at the Academy of Economic Studies, a position he has held since 2013.

He served as Alternate Executive Director at the World Bank from March 1, 2024 to 31 January 2026.

Between August 2019 and August 2023 he was Romania's representative to the International Monetary Fund and Senior Advisor to the IMF Executive Director. In this capacity he was a member of the executive board of the International Monetary Fund. He also represented Montenegro to the IMF.

Previously, Mr Voinea served as Deputy Governor of the National Bank of Romania between October 2014 and August 2019. In that capacity, he was a member of the European Systemic Risk Board, the Economic and Financial Committee of the European Commission, the International Relations Committee, the European Central Bank, the Financial Stability Board – Regional Consultative Group for Europe, the High Level Working Group on Regulatory of Sovereign Exposures.

From December 2012 to August 2014, he served as Minister Delegate for Budget in the Romanian Government, with responsibility for public finances and public debt management. In this capacity he was Romania's representative to the Economic and Financial Council; Romania's Governor to the World Bank, EBRD and EIB. During his mandate, Romania exited the excessive deficit procedure, met the medium term objective of the structural deficit, issued Eurobonds with longest maturities to date (30 years for dollar-denominated bonds), build up a foreign exchange buffer, and reached investment grade from all major rating agencies. Earlier, he was Deputy Minister of Finance (May 2012 – December 2012), responsible for public policies.

In parallel, Mr. Voinea has been a member of the Principles Consultative Group of the Institute of International Finance and professor of International Economics and Macroeconomics at the Academy of Economic Studies.

== Education ==
Liviu Voinea graduated from Academy of Economics, Faculty of International Business. He has a Master of Science in Business Administration degree from Stockholm University, School of Business. In 2000 he obtained the Ph.D. in economics from the Academy of Economics, Faculty of Economics.

== Awards ==
Romanian Academy's "Virgil Madgearu" Award in economic sciences, 2007 for the book Transnational corporations and global capitalism

== Research ==
Liviu Voinea was post-doctoral researcher at the Institute for Prospective Technological Studies, Joint Research Center of the European Commission, based in Seville, Spain (2004). After returning to Romania, he co-founded the Group of Applied Economics (GEA), where he was Director of Research and then executive director.

He published articles in journals such as Journal of International Money and Finance, Review of International Political Economy, Economics of Transition, as well as IMF Working Paper and World Bank Policy Research Working paper (details in the main publications and references sections). In 2021 he published a book on inflation, consumption and savings at Palgrave Macmillan (“Defensive Expectations. Reinventing the Phillips Curve as a Policy Mix”).

== Main publications ==
- Voinea, L., "Defensive Expectations. Reinventing the Phillips Curve as a Policy Mix". Palgrave Macmillan (2021).
- Nier, E., Popa, R., Shamloo, M., Voinea, L., “Debt Service and Default: Calibrating Macroprudential Policy Using Micro Data”. IMF Working Paper 19/182, 2019.
- Voinea, L. et al., "One Hundred Years of Honesty: Recovering the Lost Memory of the Romanian Economy 1918-2018". Publica (2019), Kindle Edition.
- Voinea, L., "The post-crisis Phillips Curve and its policy implications: cumulative wage gap matters for inflation". SUERF (2019).
- Voinea, L., "Explaining the post-crisis Phillips curve: Cumulated wage gap matters for inflation". CEPS (2018).
- Voinea, L., Lovin, H., Cojocaru, A., "The Impact of Inequality on the Transmission of Monetary Policy". Journal of International Money and Finance (2017), Elsevier, vol. 85(C), pages 236–250.
- Voinea, L. (coord), "Un Veac de Sinceritate. Recuperarea memoriei pierdute a economiei romanesti 1918-2018". Publica, 2018.
- Voinea, L., Alupoaiei, A., Dragu, F., Neagu, F., Chapter: Adjustments in the balance sheets – is it normal, this "new normal"? in Debt Default and Democracy". 2018, (editors: Giuseppe Eusepi and Richard Wagener), Edward Elgar Publishing.
- Heemskerk, F., Voinea, L., Cojocaru, A., "Busting the Myth: The Impact of Increasing the Minimum Wage : The Experience of Romania". (English), 2018, Policy Research working paper; no. WPS 8632. Washington, D.C.: World Bank Group.
- Voinea, L. "Revisiting Crisis Generators in Romania and other EU’s New Member States", Review of International Political Economy, vol. 20, no.4, 2013, pp. 979–1008.
- Voinea, L., Mihăescu, F., "A contribution to the public-private wage inequality debate: the iconic case of Romania", Economics of Transition, vol.20 (2), 2012, pg. 315–337.
- Voinea, L., (co-editor), "New Policy changes for European Multinationals", Vol. 7 Progress in International Business Research, 2012, pg. 119-135 (Liviu Voinea, Flaviu Mihaescu, Andrada Busuioc, "The Impact of Transaction Costs on Interest". Margins in the Romanian Banking Sector), and pg. 1-27 (Alain Verbeke, Rob van Tulder, Liviu Voinea, "New Policy Challenges for European Multinationals: A Resource Bundling Perspective"), pg. 467, Emerald, London
- Voinea, L., Mihăescu, F., "The impact of flat tax on inequality. The case of Romania", Romanian Journal of Economic Forecasting vol. XII, no.4, 2009, pg.19-41,
- Voinea, L., The end of illusion economics: crisis and anti-crisis. A heterodox approach, Publica (in Romanian) 179 pg., 2009
- Voinea, L. Stephan, L., "Market concentration and innovation in transnational corporations. Evidence from foreign affiliates in Central and Eastern Europe", in Progress in international business research (eds: Tiia Vassak, Jorma Larimo), Vol. 4, Research on knowledge, innovation and internationalization, 2009, Emerald, London, pg. 207–224, 271 pg.
- Voinea, L., Mihăescu, F., "What Drives Foreign Banks to South East Europe?", Transformations in business and economics, vol. 57, no 3(15), Supplement C, 2008, pg.107–122.
- Voinea, L., Transnational corporations and global capitalism, Polirom (in Romanian), 198 pg., 2007
- Voinea, L., "Has CEFTA been a training ground for EU accession? The case of Romania", International Journal of Trade and Global Markets, vol.1, no.1, 2007, pg.53–68,
- Voinea, L., "As Good as it Gets? FDI Dynamics and Impact in Romania" published in Foreign Direct Investment Policies in South East Europe, 2006, Jovancevic, R., Z.Sevic (Eds), pg.231–250, 329 pg., Greenwich University Press
- Voinea, L. "Specialization without change: foreign direct investment and Romania’s foreign trade" in New economists about Romania's transition (coordinators: Mugur Isarescu, Daniel Daianu), pg.605–624, 624 pg., Enciclopedica (in Romanian), Collection National Bank Library, 2003.

== Conferences (selected) ==
- București, April 2019, The EUROFI HIGH LEVEL SEMINAR 2019, panel AML-TF: improving supervision and detection.
- Londra, March 2019, speaker at the Conference National Asset - Liability Management Europe 2019 Summit
- Londra, February 2019, Romania Investor Days, Wood & Company
- Indonesia, October 2018, IMF/World Bank Annual Meeting
- Jordan, May 2018, BERD Annual Meeting
- Brussels, May 2018, speaker at the CEPS-IMF Spring 2018 Regional Economic Outlook Conference, "Europe – managing the upswing in uncertain times"
- Brussesls, May 2018, speaker at the ninth Debt Management Facility Stakeholder's Forum Rising Tide of Debt: Risk, Resilience, Responsibility
- Washington, April 2018, IMF/World Bank Spring Meeting
- Buenos Aires, March 2018, BIS – G20 meeting for Central Banks
- Bucharest, October 2017, "10 years of Romania's EU membership - Looking through the future"
- Lisabona, September 2017, "Trade-offs in modern central banking" speaker at the Joint Banco de Portugal and ECB conference on risk management for central banks
- Cluj-Napoca, September 2017, "Macroeconomic disparities at regional level in Romania", speaker at the "Regional Polarisation and Unequal Development in CEE: Challenges for Innovative Space-based Policies" conference
- Bruxelles, September 2017, "Finance and housing in central and eastern europe: A demand-side approach" speaker at the Bruegel Annual Meetings
- Bucharest, August 2017, "Romania in the Euro Area: when and how?" speaker at the Annual Meeting of Romanian Diplomacy
- Nicosia, May 2017, "Romania - Financial sector", organised by EBRD
- Washington, D.C., April 2017, "Breaking the back of NPLs – the Romanian experience" organised by IMF
- Bucharest, May 2016, speaker at the "Romania's Convergence: The Way Forward" IMF conference
- Johns Hopkins University, November 2016 – "Macroeconomic developments in Romania"
- Zurich, October 2016, conference"Monetary Policy, Macroprudential Regulation and Inequality", organized by Council on Economic Policies (CEP) and International Monetary Fund (IMF)
- Washington, October 2016, speaker at the JP Morgan Investor Seminar
- Washington, October 2016, IMF/WB annual meetings
- Vienna, January 2016, speaker at The Central & Eastern European Forum organized by Euromoney
- Lima, October 2015, speaker at the JP Morgan Investor Seminar
- St. Louis, September 2015, conference "Monetary Policy and the Distribution of Income and Wealth", organized by Federal Reserve Bank of St. Louis
- Washington, June 2015, 15th Annual International Conference on Policy Challenges for the Financial Sector, Federal Reserve/WB/IMF
- Tbilisi, May 2015, speaker at the EBRD Business Forum
- Washington, April 2015, speaker at the JP Morgan Investor Seminar
- Zagreb, March 2015, speaker at The Institute of Economics
- Vienna, January 2015, speaker at The Central & Eastern European Forum organized by Euromoney
- Warsaw, December 2014, speaker at the "New Member States Policy Forum" organized by IMF
- Warsaw, May 2014, speaker at The Institute of International Finance (IIF) Conference "Annual Meeting of CEE CEOs"
- Washington, April 2014, speaker at the JP Morgan Investor Seminar
- Vienna, January 2014, speaker at The Central & Eastern European Forum organized by Euromoney
- Vilnius, September 2013, speaker at The Eurofi Financial Forum
- Krynica, September 2013, speaker at The Economic Forum
- Stockholm, September 2012, guest speaker at the Stockholm School of Economics
- Berlin, February 2012, guest speaker at the "Which Europe do we want?"conference, Friedrich Ebert Stiftung and Das Progressive Zentrum
- Providence, New York, September 2011, guest lecturer – Brown University, Watson Institute
- New Delhi, March 2011, IIF Annual Conference
- Paris, March 2008, speaker at the OECD Global Forum on Investments
- Bruxelles, April 2007, speaker at the Centre for European Policy Studies
- Budapest, June 2006, guest lecturer at the Central European University
- European International Business Academy Annual Conferences (Bucharest -2011, Porto -2010, Valencia -2009, Fribourg -2006, Ljubljana – 2004, Copenhagen – 2003)
