= Rovana Plumb =

Romanian politician (born 1960)

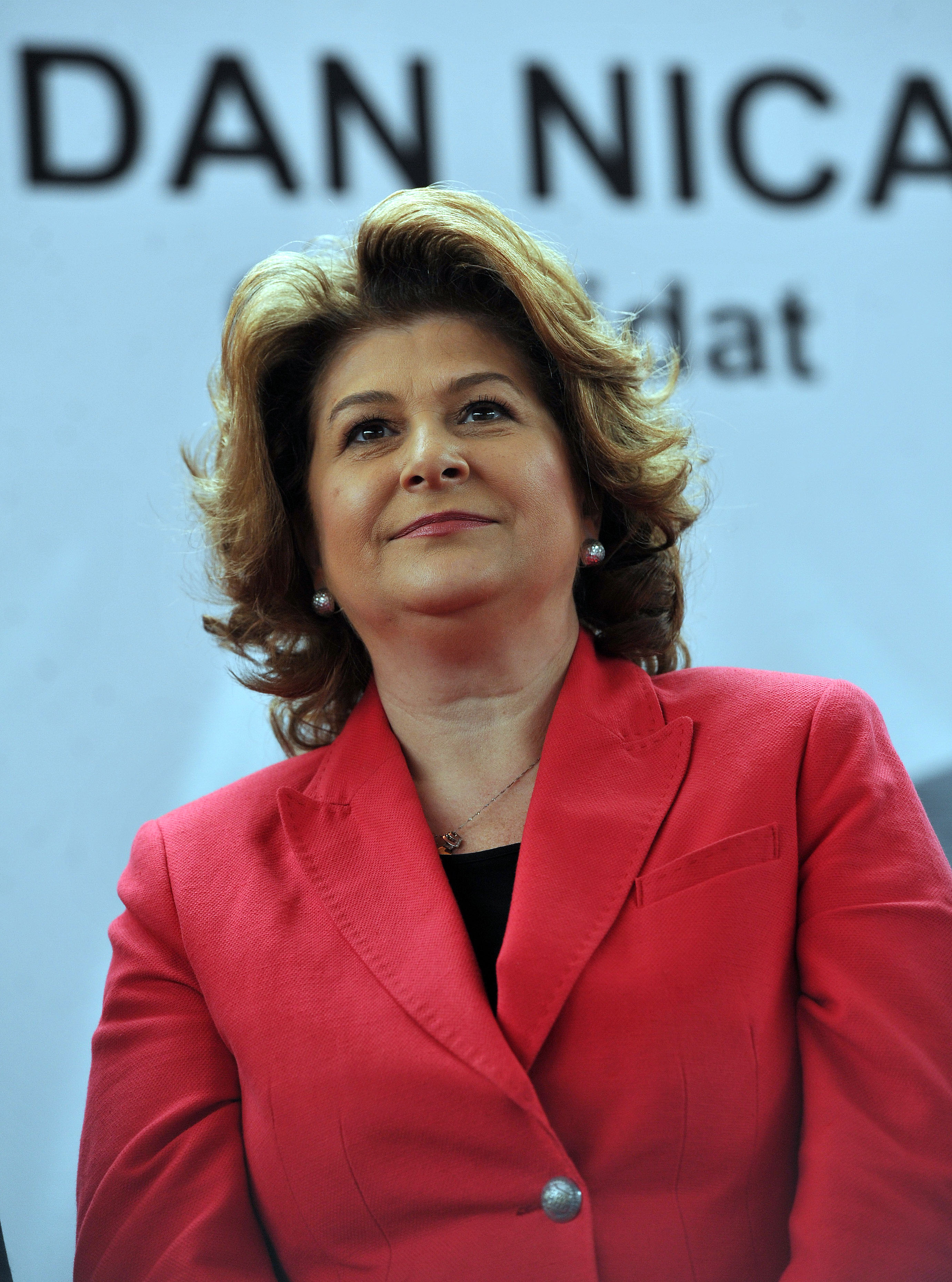

Minister of European Funds
- In office 29 January 2018 – 24 April 2019
- Prime Minister: Viorica Dăncilă
- Preceded by: Marius Nica
- Succeeded by: Roxana Mînzatu

President of the Social Democratic Party Acting
- In office 24 June 2015 – 22 July 2015
- Preceded by: Victor Ponta
- Succeeded by: Liviu Dragnea

Minister of Labour, Family, Social Protection and Elders
- In office 5 March 2014 – 9 November 2015
- Prime Minister: Victor Ponta
- Preceded by: Mariana Câmpeanu
- Succeeded by: Claudia-Ana Costea

Minister of Environment and Climate Change
- In office 7 May 2012 – 5 March 2014
- Prime Minister: Victor Ponta
- Preceded by: Attila Korodi
- Succeeded by: Attila Korodi

Personal details
- Born: 22 June 1960 (age 66) Bucharest, Romania
- Party: Social Democratic Party
- Other party: Progressive Alliance of Socialists and Democrats; Party of European Socialists
- Education: Bucharest University of Economic Studies

Rovana Plumb (born 22 June 1960) is a Romanian politician of the Social Democratic Party (PSD). She was appointed Minister of Environment and Forests (now Minister of Environment and Climate Change) on 7 May 2012. From 5 March 2014 to 9 November 2015, she was the Minister of Labor, Family, Social Protection and Elderly in the Government of Romania. In March 2015, Rovana Plumb was elected President of the National Council of PSD.

== Early life and education ==
Plumb attended the Bucharest Academy of Economic Studies (ASE).

== Political career ==
Plumb served as a member of the Parliament of Romania from 2004 to 2007 and the European Parliament from 2009 to 2012. In that capacity, she was a member of the Committee on Budgets (2007) and the Committee on Employment and Social Affairs (2007–2012).

Following the 2019 European elections, Plumb rejoined the European Parliament and was elected vice-chair of the S&D Group, under the leadership of chairwoman Iratxe García. She also joined the Committee on the Environment, Public Health and Food Safety.

== Controversy ==
Plumb was named in a corruption case in 2017, in which she was accused of aiding the leader of her Social Democratic Party (PSD) in an illicit real estate deal involving ownership of an island in the Danube River.
