= 2019 Romanian presidential election =

- 10 November 2019 (first round); 24 November 2019 (second round)
- Turnout: 51.18% (first round) ▼2.00pp 54.86% (second round) ▼9.25pp
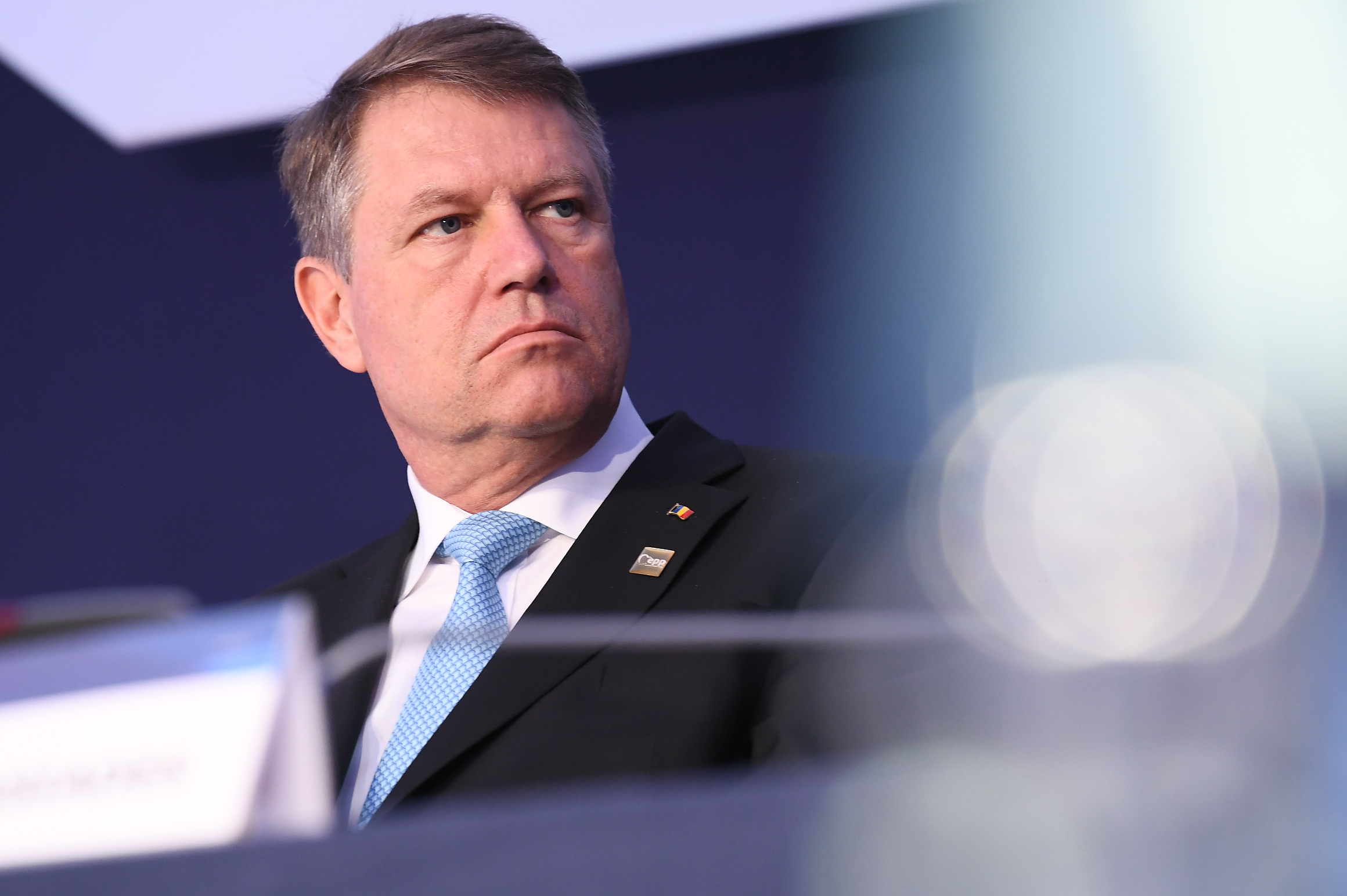

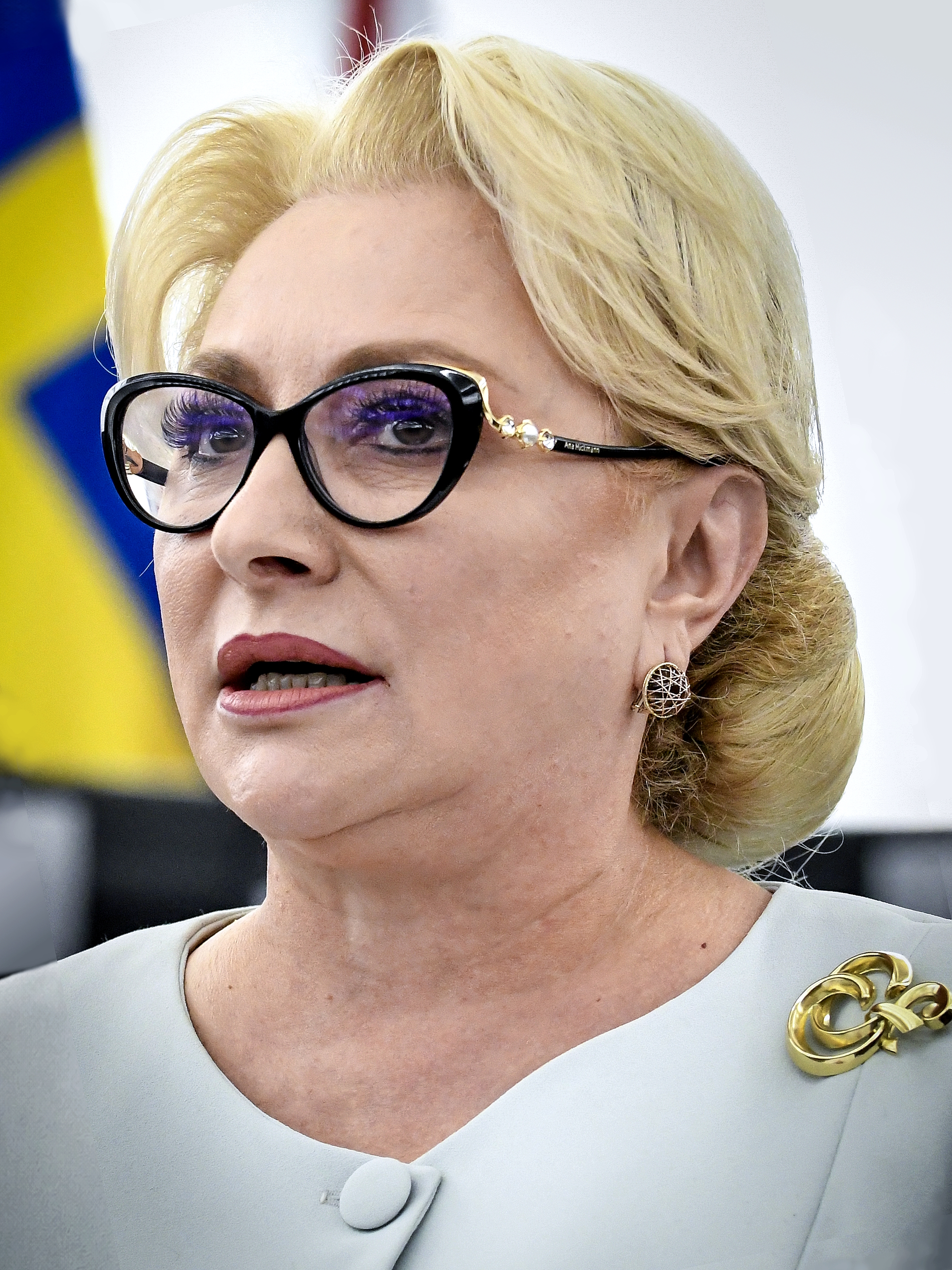
Nominee	Klaus Iohannis	Viorica Dăncilă
Party	Independent (Note: The President of Romania traditionally resigns from party membership after taking office. Although Iohannis was officially an independent, his campaign was endorsed and funded by National Liberal Party.)	PSD
Popular vote	6,509,135	3,339,922
Percentage	66.09%	33.91%
- Second round results by county Iohannis: 50–60% 60–70% 70–80% 80–90% Dăncilă: 50–60%
President before election
Klaus Iohannis
Independent
Elected President
Klaus Iohannis
Independent

Presidential elections were held in Romania on 10 November 2019, with a second round held on 24 November 2019. They were the eighth presidential election held in post-1989 Romania. Incumbent president Klaus Iohannis, first elected in the 2014 election, was eligible for re-election.

In the first round, Iohannis finished first with 37.82% of the vote, while former prime minister and ex-leader of the Social Democratic Party (PSD), Viorica Dăncilă, finished second with 22.26%. As no candidate received an absolute majority, the two advanced to the second round.

In the second round, Iohannis defeated Dăncilă in a landslide, receiving 66.09% of the vote to her 33.91%. It was the third-highest vote share in a Romanian presidential election since 1989, behind only Ion Iliescu, who received 85.07% of the vote in 1990 and 66.83% in 2000.

== Background ==
Klaus Iohannis won the previous presidential election in 2014 and was sworn in for his first term on 21 December 2014. According to the Article 83 of the Constitution of Romania, the "term of office of the President of Romania is five years, being exercised from the date the oath was taken," but only for up to two terms. In June 2018, incumbent president Iohannis publicly announced his intention of running for a second term as president. The electoral calendar for the presidential elections was set by the Romanian Government.

The final results for the first round were publicly announced by Central Electoral Bureau and Permanent Electoral Authority on 14 November 2019. The results were forwarded to the Constitutional Court of Romania that validated the results on 15 November 2019. After the Constitutional Court's validation, the results were sent for publication to the Official Journal of Romania (Monitorul Oficial al României). Only after the publication by the Official Journal, the results for the first round of the elections became official.

The Central Electoral Bureau (BEC) forwarded the final results for the second round to the Constitutional Court of Romania for validation on 28 November 2019, on the last day of the settled electoral calendar. The Constitutional Court of Romania validated the results in the same day.

== Candidates ==
=== National Liberal Party (PNL) ===
President Klaus Iohannis was eligible for re-election. His candidacy in the 2014 elections was supported by the National Liberal Party (PNL), whose President he was at that time. Upon taking office as president, Iohannis suspended his PNL membership, as the Constitution does not allow the president to be a formal member of a political party during his term. Ludovic Orban, the president of the PNL, reconfirmed the party's support for Iohannis after the elections. On 11 March 2018, the National Council of PNL formally endorsed Klaus Iohannis for a new term as president.

=== Social Democratic Party (PSD) ===
Liviu Pleșoianu, a member of the Chamber of Deputies for Bucharest since 2016 for the Social Democratic Party (PSD), declared his candidacy on 23 July 2017. Liviu Dragnea, President of the Chamber of Deputies since 2016, and Gabriela Firea, Mayor of Bucharest since 2016, are thought to be other potential PSD candidates. However, both have refuted these media speculations, Firea stating she wants to finish her term as mayor, while Liviu Dragnea rejected the idea and stated he and the PSD concentrate on the governing program and the parliamentary agenda, as Dragnea is President of the Chamber of Deputies. After being convicted on corruption charges on 27 May 2019, Dragnea became ineligible to run for president.

=== Save Romania Union (USR) and PLUS Alliance ===
Nicușor Dan, a former President of the Save Romania Union (USR), the third largest political party in the country, believed that the party should run its own candidate for the elections. Dan Barna, the new President of the USR, stated in an interview with Adevărul that the USR would have a presidential candidate, decided by a vote within the party. Barna also said that "Dacian Cioloș may be an option, like any well-known person".

Former Minister of Labor in Cioloș Government, Dragoș Pîslaru, who is among the founders of the new party of former Prime Minister, the PLUS, said the party was ready for a possible candidacy for the presidency of leader Dacian Cioloș. He also stressed that a candidacy of President Iohannis for a new term would not exclude a candidacy of Dacian Cioloș. On 8 June 2018, Cioloș said he would not run against Klaus Iohannis. However he subsequently stated that he would assume any responsibility that his recently founded political party (PLUS) would bestow upon him, not excluding the presidency.

In the aftermath of the results of the 2019 European Parliament elections, USR and PLUS decided to keep the 2020 USR-PLUS Alliance for the presidential elections, and nominated Dan Barna as joint candidate.

=== Other political parties ===
Many voices inside ALDE suggested that Călin Popescu-Tăriceanu, the party leader and former President of the Senate, should be the proposal of the PSD–ALDE coalition for the upcoming election and asked for PSD support in this regard. Tăriceanu himself considered that the best option for the presidential election is a PSD–ALDE joint candidacy. On 24 July 2019, ALDE announced that Tăriceanu would run for president on its ticket.

In a press conference on 26 October 2017, Victor Ponta, a former Prime Minister and runner-up in the 2014 elections, claimed that his newly established party, PRO Romania, would nominate a candidate in the elections, but denied that he would run for the presidency again.

On 25 August 2019, Theodor Paleologu was designated candidate of the People's Movement Party (PMP).

On 7 July 2019, Ramona-Ioana Bruynseels launched her candidacy. The announcement was met with surprise and intrigue from political commentators. Bruynseels has set her platform on taking on the broken political system in Romania that she argues is working against the interests of its citizens. Bruynseels is a centrist politician and was the candidate of the Humanist Power Party. At the time of these elections, the party was controlled from behind the scenes by Romanian mogul and former longtime Securitatea collaborator Dan Voiculescu.

=== Candidates qualified for the second round ===
On 28 November 2019, The Romanian Central Electoral Bureau (BEC) forwarded the final results to the Constitutional Court of Romania, which validated the results in the same day.

Name	Born	Public Office Experience	Campaign and affiliation	Alma mater and profession	Candidacy Announcement dates
Klaus Iohannis	13 June 1959 (age 60); Sibiu, Sibiu County	President of Romania (2014–election day); Mayor of Sibiu (2000–2014); Former presidential election: 2014: 30.37% (2nd place, 1st round), 54.43% (winner, 2nd round)	Motto: Pentru o Românie normală (For a Normal Romania); Affiliation: PNL (membership suspended while being President of Romania); Endorsed by: FDGR/DFDR; Endorsement added for the second round: 2020 USR-PLUS Alliance, PMP	Faculty of Physics, Babeș-Bolyai University, Cluj-Napoca (1983) Physics teacher	Intention: 11 March 2018; Official: 23 June 2018; BEC filing: 20 September 2019; BEC validation: 22 September 2019; CCR validation for qualifying to the second round: 15 November 2019; CCR validation as President-elect: 28 November 2019
Viorica Dăncilă	16 December 1963 (age 55); Roșiorii de Vede, Teleorman County	Prime Minister of Romania (2018–2019); MEP (2009–2018)	Motto: Alături de fiecare român (Standing by each Romanian); Affiliation: PSD; Endorsed by: PNȚCD, UNPR; Endorsement added for the second round: FN, PNeR	Faculty of Drilling of Wells and Exploitation of Hydrocarbon Deposits, Petroleum and Gas University, Ploiești (1988) Oil engineer, petroleum technology teacher	Intention: 11 July 2019; Official: 23 July 2019; BEC filing: 19 September 2019; BEC validation: 20 September 2019; CCR validation for qualifying to the second round: 15 November 2019; CCR validation of the second round results: 28 November 2019

=== Candidates that competed only in the first round ===
For all these candidates, the competition ended on 15 November 2019, when the Constitutional Court of Romania validated the results of the first round (only the first two placed competitors were qualified for the second round).

Name	Born	Public Office Experience	Affiliation and endorsements	Alma mater and profession	Candidacy Announcement dates
Dan Barna	10 July 1975 (age 44); Sibiu, Sibiu County	Deputy (2016–election day); Secretary of State with the Ministry of European Funds (2016)	Motto: Fericiți în România ([We,] Happy in Romania); Affiliation: 2020 USR-PLUS Alliance (alliance members: USR and PLUS)	Faculty of Law, University of Bucharest (1998) lawyer	Intention: 1 July 2019; Official: 13 July 2019; BEC filing: 20 September 2019; BEC validation: 22 September 2019; Second round: Endorsed Klaus Iohannis (11 November 2019)
Mircea Diaconu	24 December 1949 (age 69); Vlădești, Argeș County; Died 14 December 2024, Bucharest	MEP (2014–2019); Minister of Culture (2012); Senator (2008–2012)	Motto: Cu bună credință (In Good Faith); Affiliation: none, supported by The Alliance for One Man (alliance members: PRO Romania, ALDE)	Caragiale Academy of Theatrical Arts and Cinematography, Bucharest (1971) actor	Intention: 25 August 2019; Official: 27 August 2019; BEC filing: 21 September 2019; BEC validation: 22 September 2019; Second round: Non-partisan (10 November 2019)
Theodor Paleologu	15 July 1973 (age 46); Bucharest	Deputy (2008–2016); Minister of Culture (2008–2009); Ambassador to Denmark (2005–2008)	Motto: Respect, educație, performanță (Respect, Education, Performance); Affiliation: none, supported by PMP	Faculty of Philosophy, University of Paris 1 Pantheon-Sorbonne (1998) philosophy and political science professor	Intention: 17 July 2019; Official: 25 August 2019; BEC filing: 20 September 2019; BEC validation: 20 September 2019; Second round: Against Viorica Dăncilă, without openly endorsing Klaus Iohannis (22 November 2019); His party, PMP, openly endorsed Klaus Iohannis: 13 November 2019
Hunor Kelemen	18 October 1967 (age 52); Cârța, Harghita County	Deputy (2000–election day); Minister of Culture (2009–2012, 2014); Secretary of State with the Minister of Culture (1997–2000) Former presidential elections: 2014: 3.47% (8th place); 2009: 3.83% (5th place)	Motto: Respect pentru toți (Respect for Everyone) Affiliation: UDMR	University of Agricultural Sciences and Veterinary Medicine of Cluj-Napoca (1993), Faculty of Philosophy, Babeș-Bolyai University, Cluj-Napoca (1998) veterinarian, philosophy teacher	Intention: 23 February 2019; Official: 30 August 2019; BEC filing: 21 September 2019; BEC validation: 22 September 2019; Second round: Endorsed Klaus Iohannis (10 November 2019); His organization, UDMR, had a non-partisan stance (13 November 2019)
Ramona-Ioana Bruynseels	14 February 1980 (age 39); Cluj-Napoca, Cluj County	Secretary of State with the General Secretariat of the Government (2017–2018)	Motto: Fără imunitate ([Politicians] Free of Immunity); Affiliation: Humanist Power Party	Faculty of Law, Dimitrie Cantemir Christian University, Cluj-Napoca (2002) jurist	Intention: 8 June 2019; Official: 8 July 2019; BEC filing: 22 September 2019; BEC validation: 24 September 2019; Second round: Non-partisan (19 November 2019); Her party, PPU, advised its followers to boycott: 18 November 2019
Alexandru Cumpănașu	29 March 1981 (age 38); Caracal, Olt County		Motto: Ori noi, ori ei ([It is] Us or Them); Affiliation: none	"Ioniță Asan" high-school, Caracal (2000) civic activist	Intention: 29 August 2019; Official: 2 September 2019; BEC filing: 22 September 2019; BEC validation: 24 September 2019; Second round: Against Viorica Dăncilă, without openly endorsing Klaus Iohannis (21 November 2019)
Viorel Cataramă	31 January 1955 (age 64); Bacău, Bacău County	Senator (1996–2000); Secretary of State with the Ministry of Commerce and Tourism (1991–1992)	Motto: Muncești și câștigi (Work and Win); Affiliation: Liberal Right Party	Faculty of Commerce, Academy of Economic Studies, Bucharest (1980) economist	Intention: 10 June 2019; Official: 31 August 2019; BEC filing: 18 September 2019; BEC rejection: 20 September 2019; CCR appeal: 21 September 2019; CCR approval: 22 September 2019; Second round: Boycott (17 November 2019)
Bogdan Stanoevici	22 January 1958 (age 61); Bucharest; Died 12 January 2021, Bucharest	Secretary of State with the Minister for Relations with Abroad Romanians (2014)	Motto: România, din nou acasă (Romania, Home Again); Affiliation: none	Caragiale Academy of Theatrical Arts and Cinematography, Bucharest (1982) actor	Intention: 29 March 2019; Official: 3 May 2019; BEC filing: 22 September 2019; BEC validation: 24 September 2019; Second round: Endorsed Viorica Dăncilă (14 November 2019)
Cătălin Ivan	23 December 1978 (age 40); Galați, Galați County	MEP (2009–2019); Iași County Counsellor (2005–2009)	Motto: Președinte pentru Români (President for Romanians); Affiliation: Alternative for National Dignity	Faculty of Economics and Business Management, Alexandru Ioan Cuza University, Iași (2003) economist	Intention: 17 September 2019; Official: 17 September 2019; BEC filing: 22 September 2019; BEC validation: 24 September 2019; Second round: Against Klaus Iohannis, without openly endorsing Viorica Dăncilă (21 November 2019)
Ninel Peia	7 October 1969 (age 50); Brastavățu, Olt County	Deputy (2012–2016)	Motto: Un președinte ca niciunul (A President like Nobody else); Affiliation: Romanian Nationhood Party	Faculty of Law at an unspecified university in Bucharest (2000) jurist	Intention: 4 June 2019; Official: 4 June 2019; BEC filing: 22 September 2019; BEC validation: 24 September 2019; Second round: Endorsed Viorica Dăncilă (22 November 2019)
Sebastian Popescu	12 February 1982 (age 37); Balș, Olt County		Motto: Pentru o nouă Românie (For a New Romania); Affiliation: New Romania Party	Faculty of Veterinary Medicine, Banat University of Agricultural Sciences and Veterinary Medicine, Timișoara (2006) veterinarian	Intention: 17 June 2018; Official: 17 June 2018; BEC filing: 22 September 2019; BEC validation: 24 September 2019; Second round: Blank vote (24 November 2019)
John Ion Banu	8 July 1960 (age 59); Roman, Neamț County		Motto: Certitudinea românilor (Romanians' Certainty); Affiliation: Romanian Nation Party	Politehnica University of Bucharest mechanical engineer	Intention: 13 June 2019; Official: 13 June 2019; BEC filing: 22 September 2019; BEC validation: 24 September 2019; Second round: Boycott (18 November 2019)

=== Withdrawn candidates ===
Name	Born	Public Office Experience	Affiliation and endorsement	Alma mater and Profession	Candidacy Announcement dates
Dragoș Dinulescu	1987 (age 32); Câmpina, Prahova County		Affiliation: USR	Faculty of Dental Medicine, Titu Maiorescu University, Bucharest (2011) dentist	Intention: 1 July 2019; Withdrawal: 13 July 2019; Endorsed Dan Barna, after he became party nominee: 13 July 2019
Mihai Goțiu	6 December 1973 (age 45); Ilia, Hunedoara County	Deputy (2016–election day)	Affiliation: USR	Faculty of Journalism, Babeș-Bolyai University, Cluj-Napoca (1997) journalist, writer	Intention: 1 July 2019; Withdrawal: 13 July 2019; Endorsed Dan Barna, after he became party nominee: 13 July 2019
Dumitru Stanca	Dolj County		Affiliation: USR	Faculty of History, University of Galați (2002); Nicolae Bălcescu Land Forces Academy, Sibiu (1986) military	Intention: 1 July 2019; Withdrawal: 13 July 2019; Endorsed Dan Barna, after he became party nominee: 13 July 2019
Dacian Cioloș	27 July 1969 (age 50); Zalău, Sălaj County	MEP (2019–election day); Prime Minister of Romania (2015–2017); European Commissioner for Agriculture and Rural Development (2010-2014); Minister of Agriculture (2007-2008); Ministerial advisor with the Ministry of Agriculture (2005-2007); SAPARD implementation manager with the Representation of the European Commission in Romania (2002-2003); Final poll to appear (6 August 2019): 10.4% (4th place)	Affiliation: PLUS	Faculty of Horticulture, University of Agricultural Sciences and Veterinary Medicine of Cluj-Napoca (1994) horticultural engineer	Intention: 2 March 2019; Withdrawal: 19 July 2019; Endorsed Dan Barna, after he got party endorsement: 19 July 2019; Endorsed Klaus Iohannis: 11 November 2019
Ecaterina Andronescu	7 April 1948 (age 71); Malovăț, Mehedinți County	Senator (2008–election day); Minister of Education (2000-2003, 2008-2009, 2012, 2018-2019); Deputy (1996-2008)	Affiliation: PSD	Faculty of Chemistry, Politehnica University of Bucharest (1972) chemistry professor	Intention: 15 January 2019; Withdrawal: 22 July 2019; Endorsed Viorica Dăncilă, after she became party nominee: 22 July 2019
Șerban Nicolae	5 April 1968 (age 51); Bucharest	Senator (2004-2008, 2012–election day); Minister for Liaison with Parliament (2004); Presidential advisor (2001-2004)	Affiliation: PSD	Faculty of Law, Romanian-American University, Bucharest (1997) mechanical worker, lawyer	Intention: 13 June 2019; Withdrawal: 22 July 2019; Endorsed Viorica Dăncilă, after she became party nominee: 22 July 2019
Eugen Teodorovici	12 August 1971 (age 48); Bucharest	Senator (2012–election day); Minister of Finance (2015, 2018-2019); Minister of European Funds (2012-2015); Final poll to appear (July 8, 2019): 5% (5th place)	Affiliation: PSD	Faculty of Commerce, Academy of Economic Studies, Bucharest (1997) economist	Intention: 22 June 2019; Withdrawal: 22 July 2019; Endorsed Viorica Dăncilă, after she became party nominee: 22 July 2019
Mihai Fifor	10 May 1970 (age 49); Drobeta-Turnu Severin, Mehedinți County	Senator (2012–election day) acting Prime Minister of Romania (2018); Minister of Defence (2017-2018); Minister of Economy (2017)	Affiliation: PSD	Faculty of Letters and History, University of Craiova (1994) museum curator	Intention: 23 June 2019; Withdrawal: 22 July 2019; Endorsed Viorica Dăncilă, after she became party nominee: 22 July 2019
Gabriela Firea	13 July 1972 (age 47); Bacău, Bacău County	Mayor of Bucharest (2016–election day); Senator (2012-2016); Secretary of State for Governmental Communication (1999-2000); Final poll to appear (27 January 2019): 17% (2nd place)	Affiliation: PSD	Faculty of Letters, University of Bucharest (1994) journalist	Denied interest: 26 May 2019; Intention: 18 July 2019; Withdrawal: 23 July 2019; Endorsed Viorica Dăncilă: 23 July 2019
Mihail Neamțu	16 April 1978 (age 41); Făgăraș, Brașov County		Affiliation: PMP; Endorsed by: Alternative Right Party	Faculty of Philosophy, Babeș-Bolyai University, Cluj-Napoca (2000); Faculty of Orthodox Theology, Babeș-Bolyai University, Cluj-Napoca (2005) theologist, writer	Intention: 19 July 2019; Withdrawal: 24 August 2019; Endorsed Theodor Paleologu: 24 August 2019
George Mioc	20 April 1951 (age 68); Cărpiniș, Timiș County	Final poll to appear (23 November 2017): 1% (7th place)	Affiliation: none Endorsed by: The New Republic	Mechanical engineer	Intention: 19 July 2019; Withdrawal: 25 August 2019; Endorsed Theodor Paleologu: 25 August 2019
Robert Turcescu	3 May 1975 (age 44); Pitești, Argeș County	Deputy (2016–election day)	Affiliation: PMP	Superior School of Journalism, Bucharest (1997); Faculty of Journalism and Communication Sciences, University of Bucharest (1998) journalist	Intention: 19 July 2019; Withdrawal: 25 August 2019; Endorsed Theodor Paleologu, after he became party nominee: 25 August 2019
Adrian Papahagi	20 March 1976 (age 43); Cluj-Napoca, Cluj County	Counsellor with the Ministry of Foreign Affairs (2010-2012)	Affiliation: none	Faculty of Philology, Babeș-Bolyai University, Cluj-Napoca (1998); École normale supérieure, Paris (2000) philologist	Intention: 19 July 2019; Withdrawal: 25 August 2019; Endorsed Theodor Paleologu: 28 August 2019
Corina Crețu	24 June 1967 (age 52); Bucharest	MEP (2007-2014, 2019–election day); European Commissioner for Regional Policy (2014-2019); Senator (2004–2007); Deputy (2000-2001); Presidential advisor (1992-1996, 2001-2004); Final poll to appear (8 July 2019): 4% (6th place)	Affiliation: Pro Romania	Faculty of Cybernetics, Academy of Economic Studies, Bucharest (1989) economist, journalist	Intention: 8 January 2019; Withdrawal: 26 August 2019; Endorsed Mircea Diaconu, after he got party endorsement: 26 August 2019
Călin Popescu-Tăriceanu	14 January 1952 (age 67); Bucharest	Senator (2012–election day); President of the Senate of Romania (2014–2019) acting Minister of Foreign Affairs (2007); Prime Minister of Romania (2004–2008); Minister of Industry and Commerce (1996-1997); Deputy (1990-1992, 1996–2012); Final poll to appear (August 30, 2019): 12.7% (4th place); Former presidential election: 2014: 5.36% (3rd place)	Affiliation: ALDe	Faculty of Hydrotechnical Engineering, Technical University of Civil Engineering of Bucharest (1976) hydrotechnical engineer	Intention: 11 April 2019; Suspended: 3 June 2019; Resumed: 14 July 2019; Withdrawal: 26 August 2019; First round: Endorsed Mircea Diaconu, after he got party endorsement (26 August 2019); Second round: Non-partisan (20 November 2019)
Sorin Cîmpeanu	18 April 1968 (age 51); Bucharest	Deputy (2016–election day) acting Prime Minister of Romania (2015); Minister of Education (2014-2015)	Affiliation: Pro Romania	Faculty of Land Reclamation and Environmental Engineering, University of Agronomic Sciences and Veterinary Medicine of Bucharest (1991) agriculture professor	Intention: 18 June 2019; Withdrawal: 26 August 2019; Endorsed Mircea Diaconu, after he got party endorsement: 26 August 2019
Florin Călinescu	29 April 1956 (age 63); Timișoara, Timiș County		Affiliation: Green Party	Caragiale Academy of Theatrical Arts and Cinematography, Bucharest (1979) actor, TV entertainer	Intention: 12 January 2019; Suspended: 24 July 2019; Resumed: 3 August 2019; Withdrawal: 30 August 2019
Mădălina Baroncea	20 July 1973 (age 46); Bucharest		Affiliation: none	Faculty of Commerce and Marketing, Academy of Economic Studies, Bucharest (1997) marketing specialist	Intention: 19 March 2019; Withdrawal: 30 August 2019; Endorsed Alexandru Cumpănașu: 30 August 2019
Marian Bătăiosu	30 October 1966 (age 53); Bucharest		Affiliation: none	Faculty of Engineering and Technical Systems Management, Politehnica University of Bucharest (night course) mechanical engineer	Intention: 5 September 2019; Official: 5 September 2019; Withdrawal: 12 September 2019
Avram Iancu	18 February 1976 (age 43); Petroșani, Hunedoara County		Affiliation: none	Technical and Administrative College, Petroșani librarian	Intention: 7 August 2019; Withdrawal: 15 September 2019
George Alexander	16 January 1961 (age 58); Voicești, Vâlcea County		Affiliation: none	Oslo Metropolitan University pedagogue, writer	Intention: 13 August 2019; Official: 13 August 2019; Withdrawal: 19 September 2019; Endorsed Ninel Peia: 4 October 2019
Sorin Budăcan	15 August 1975 (age 44); Bistrița, Bistrița-Năsăud County		Affiliation: none		Intention: 6 September 2017; Official: 6 September 2017; Withdrawal: 22 September 2019
Laurențiu Primo	12 February 1982 (age 37); Balș, Olt County		Affiliation: Meritocracy Movement	writer	Intention: 29 September 2018; Official: 29 September 2018; Failure to file candidacy to BEC (post-factum Withdrawal) confirmed on: 23 September 2019
Florentin Pandele	3 April 1961 (age 58); Petrăchioaia, Ilfov County	Mayor of Voluntari, Ilfov County (2000–election day)	Affiliation: none	Faculty of Navigation, Mircea cel Bătrân Naval Academy (1984); Faculty of Law, Bioterra University, Bucharest (2004) seaman	Intention: 30 May 2019; Official: 30 May 2019; Withdrawal: 22 September 2019; Endorsed Viorica Dăncilă: 29 September 2019
Andrei Stoican	Bucharest		Affiliation: Romanian National Movement	Faculty of Law Jurist	Intention: 21 June 2019; Withdrawal: 22 September 2019
Liviu Pleșoianu	24 January 1980 (age 39); Bucharest	Deputy (2016–election day)	Affiliation: PSD (his candidacy was not endorsed by PSD)	Faculty of Philosophy and Journalism, University of Bucharest (2002) journalist	Intention: 25 June 2019; Official: 13 July 2019; Withdrawal: 22 September 2019
Emanuel Onoriu	20 November 1971 (age 47); Bucharest		Affiliation: National Christian Union of the Roma	Faculty of Pentecostal Theology, Ovidius University, Constanța (2007) reverend	Intention: 5 August 2019; Official: 5 August 2019; Failure to file candidacy to BEC (post-factum Withdrawal) confirmed on: 24 September 2019
Gheorghe Funar	29 September 1949 (age 70); Sânnicolau Mare, Timiș County	Senator (2004–2008); Mayor of Cluj-Napoca (1992-2004) Former presidential elections: 2014: 0.47% (11th place); 1996: 3.2% (6th place); 1992: 10.8% (3rd place)	Affiliation: Our Romania Party	Faculty of Economics and Business Management, Babeș-Bolyai University, Cluj-Napoca Economist	Intention: 21 August 2019; Official: 21 August 2019; Failure to file candidacy to BEC (post-factum Withdrawal) announced on: 27 September 2019 Second round: Endorsed Viorica Dăncilă (20 November 2019)
Cătălin Berenghi	12 October 1980 (age 39); Bucharest		Affiliation: Conservatory Autonomous Dacism Party	Sapper, fighter	Intention: 28 August 2019; Official: 28 August 2019; Withdrawal: 22 September 2019; First round: Boycott (10 November 2019)
Dorin Stoichescu	Caransebeș, Caraș Severin County		Affiliation: "The Spear of Dracula" Party		Intention: 3 September 2019; Official: 3 September 2019; Withdrawal: 22 September 2019
Miron Cozma	25 August 1954 (age 65); Derna, Bihor County		Affiliation: Workers' Social-Democrat Party	Faculty of Mining Equipment, University of Petroșani (1977) mining engineer	Intention: 18 March 2019; Official: 18 March 2019; First BEC filing: 18 September 2019; First BEC rejection: 19 September 2019; Second BEC filing: 20 September 2019; Final BEC rejection: 22 September 2019
Maria Minea	2 October 1962 (age 57)		Affiliation: Patriot Romanians of Everywhere Party	Lawyer	Intention: 27 June 2019; Official: 17 August 2019; BEC filing: 22 September 2019; BEC rejection: 24 September 2019
Claudiu Crăciun	2 November 1978 (age 41); Bucharest		Affiliation: Demos Party	National University of Political Studies and Public Administration, Bucharest (2001) civic activist, political science professor	Intention: 16 July 2019; Official: 16 July 2019; BEC filing (incomplete, by choice): 22 September 2019; BEC rejection: 25 September 2019; Second round: Non-partisan; 22 November 2019
Bobby Păunescu	8 September 1974 (age 45); Bucharest		Affiliation: none	Faculty of International Management, Franklin University Switzerland, Lugano (1998) movie producer	Intention: 11 August 2019; BEC filing: 22 September 2019; BEC rejection: 24 September 2019; CCR appeal: 25 September 2019; CCR rejection: 26 September 2019
Marin Duță			Affiliation: none	University of Agronomic Sciences and Veterinary Medicine of Bucharest (1965) agricultural engineer	BEC filing (incomplete, by choice): 22 September 2019; BEC rejection: 27 September 2019
Radu Moraru	24 September 1970 (age 49); Sfântu Gheorghe, Covasna County		Affiliation: none	Journalist	Intention: 1 December 2018; Official: 20 January 2019; BEC filing (incomplete, by choice): 22 September 2019; BEC rejection: 27 September 2019; CCR appeal: 27 September 2019; CCR rejection: 30 September 2019
Bogdan-Mihail Zamfir			Affiliation: none	Lawyer	Official: 18 July 2019; BEC filing (incomplete, by choice): 22 September 2019; BEC rejection: 27 September 2019; CCR appeal: 28 September 2019; CCR rejection: 30 September 2019
Nicolae-George Epurescu	18 November 1974 (age 44); Buzău, Buzău County		Affiliation: The Civic Alternative	Faculty of Physics, University of Bucharest (2001) physics scientist	Intention: 7 September 2019; Official: 7 September 2019; BEC filing (incomplete, by choice): 21 September 2019; BEC rejection: 26 September 2019; CCR appeal: 27 September 2019; CCR rejection: 30 September 2019

=== Declined to be candidates ===
These individuals have been the subject of speculation, but have publicly denied or recanted interest in running for president.

Name	Born	Public Office Experience	Affiliation	Alma mater and profession	Candidacy Announcement dates
Ludovic Orban	25 May 1963 (age 56); Brașov, Brașov County	Prime Minister of Romania (2019-election day); Deputy (2008–2016); Minister of Transport (2007-2008); Deputy Mayor of Bucharest (2004-2007); Secretary of State with the Public Servants Agency (2000-2001); Secretary of State with Public Information Department (1999-2000); General Secretary with Disabled Persons Directorate (1998-1999); Communications Director with Energy Policies Agency (1997-1998); Local counselor, Sector 1, Bucharest (1996-1997); Local counselor, Sector 3, Bucharest (1992-1996); Final poll to appear (April 3, 2019): 2.5% (6th place)	Affiliation: PNL	Faculty of Industrial Machinery Technology, Transilvania University of Brașov (1988) technological engineer	Denied interest: 8 April 2017; Endorsed Klaus Iohannis: 8 April 2017
Victor Ponta	20 September 1972 (age 47); Bucharest	Deputy (2004–election day); Prime Minister of Romania (2012–2015); Minister of Parliamentary Relations (2008-2009); Minister-Delegate for Control of International Grant Programmes Implementation and for Monitoring the Application of the Acquis Communautaire (2004); Head of the Governmental Control Department (2001-2004); Final poll to appear (August 30, 2019): 14.0% (3rd place); Former presidential election: 2014: 40.44% (1st place, 1st round), 45.56% (2nd place, 2nd round)	Affiliation: Pro Romania	Faculty of Law, University of Bucharest (1995) prosecutor	Denied interest: 26 October 2017; First round: Endorsed Mircea Diaconu, after he got party endorsement (26 August 2019); Second round: Against Klaus Iohannis, without openly endorsing Viorica Dăncilă (14 November 2017)
Lia Olguța Vasilescu	18 November 1974 (age 44); Craiova, Dolj County	Deputy (2000–2008, 2016–election day); Minister of Labour (2017-2018); Mayor of Craiova (2012-2016); Senator (2008-2012)	Affiliation: PSD	Faculty of Philology and History, University of Craiova (1997) journalist	Denied interest: 17 January 2019; Endorsed Liviu Dragnea: 17 January 2019; Endorsed Viorica Dăncilă, after she became party nominee: 22 July 2019
Liviu Dragnea	28 October 1962 (age 57); Gratia, Teleorman County	President of the Chamber of Deputies (2016–2019); Deputy (2012–2019); Minister of Regional Development and Administration (2012-2015); Deputy Prime Minister of Romania (2012–2014); Minister of Administration of the Interior (2009); President of Teleorman County Council (2000-2012); Prefect of Teleorman County (1996-2000); Final poll to appear (22 May 2019): 7% (5th place)	Former affiliation: PSD (political rights judicially suspended due to conviction, on 29 May 2019)	Faculty of Transport, Politehnica University of Bucharest (1987); Faculty of Management and Public Administration, Ecological University of Bucharest (2003) transport engineer, bar owner	Denied interest: 26 May 2019; Endorsed Gabriela Firea: 26 May 2019
Laura Codruța Kövesi	15 May 1973 (age 46); Sfântu Gheorghe, Covasna County	European Chief Prosecutor (2019–election day); Chief Prosecutor of the National Anticorruption Directorate (2013–2018); High Representative of the Ministry of Justice for the Relation with the European Commission (2012-2013); General-Prosecutor of Romania (2006-2012); Chief Prosecutor of the Directorate for Investigating Organized Crime and Terrorism office in Sibiu County (2006); Final poll to appear (July 8, 2019): 11% (3rd place)	Affiliation: none	Faculty of Law, Babeș-Bolyai University, Cluj-Napoca (1995) prosecutor	Denied interest: 28 May 2019
Mihai Gâdea	10 January 1977 (age 42); Bucharest		Affiliation: none	Faculty of Adventist Theology (2000) TV anchor	Denied interest: 1 June 2019; First round: Endorsed Ramona Bruynseels; 8 June 2019
Ioan-Aurel Pop	1 January 1955 (age 64); Țaga, Cluj County	President of the Romanian Academy (2018–election day)	Affiliation: none	Faculty of History and Philosophy, Babeș-Bolyai University, Cluj-Napoca (1979) history professor	Denied interest: 10 June 2019
Cristian Diaconescu	2 July 1959 (age 60); Bucharest	Presidential advisor (2012-2014); Minister of Foreign Affairs (2008-2009, 2012); Senator (2004-2012); Minister of Justice (2004); Secretary of State for European Affairs with Ministry of Foreign Affairs (2004); Secretary of State for Bilateral Affairs with Ministry of Foreign Affairs (2000-2004); Final poll to appear (23 November 2017): 5% (4th place)	Affiliation: none	Faculty of Law, University of Bucharest (1983) lawyer	Denied interest: 12 July 2019
Eugen Tomac	21 June 1981 (age 38); Babele, Odesa Oblast, Ukraine	MEP (2019–election day); Deputy (2012–2019); Secretary of State for Romanians Abroad, within the Ministry of Foreign Affairs (2008-2012); Presidential advisor (2006-2008, 2012) Final poll to appear (August 30, 2019): 0.6% (7th place)	Affiliation: PMP	Faculty of History, University of Bucharest (2003) historian, journalist	Denied interest: 12 July 2019; First round: Endorsed Theodor Paleologu, after he became party nominee (25 August 2019); Second round: Endorsed Klaus Iohannis (20 November 2019)

=== Timeline ===
Intent
Withdrawn candidate
Campaign before BEC filing
During BEC screening
During CCR appeal
Validated candidate
President-elect
European elections
BEC filing deadline
First round
Second round

== Campaign ==
The electoral campaign for the first round started on 12 October 2019, 0:00 EET and ended on 9 November 2019, 7:00 EET. The electoral campaign for the second round started on 15 November 2019, 0:00 EET (several hours before the first round results were validated by the Constitutional Court of Romania) and ended on 23 November 2019, 7:00 EET. According to Romanian law, both campaigns must end at least 24 hours before the official poll openings.

=== Controversies ===
The candidate Dan Barna did not comply with the legal requirements regarding the mention of a candidate's first-degree relatives income, in the public declaration of assets (document required in a candidate's file, while registering at the Electoral Board). He stated that his wife income - who was at the time employed at Petrom - was "classified". Soon after the story sparked, he declassified his wife's annual income and changed his assets statement.

According to a media investigation, Dan Barna was allegedly involved in a financial scheme during his entrepreneurship time. He rejected the allegations.

Media released recordings of conversations that the candidate Ramona-Ioana Bruynseels had with her staff, regarding allegedly dubious acts committed with her campaign funds by Dan Voiculescu, the informal leader of the party that supports her candidacy.

The candidate Ninel Peia was reported missing, during the night of 6–7 November 2019. He was seen leaving the hotel he was lodging in Cluj-Napoca, at 1:17 am, and did not return. The following morning, he was found at Putna Monastery, 195 km away, stating that he went there "to pray".

The candidate Viorel Cataramă was reported as a former informer of the infamous Securitate (Communist Romania's intelligence service). He rejected the allegations.

Alexandru Cumpănașu was accused of either forging his BA degree or lying about being a university graduate. He failed to show a Bachelor's degree, while stating that he was a university graduate, without mentioning a university or faculty. He publicly showed an honorary diploma issued by a controversial university of Ukraine, but failed to prove his claimed status of a university graduate. Later on, he mentioned in the documents filed at the Electoral Bureau that he only graduated high-school and did not pursued any university studies. Asked to clear his lack of university studies required for a Master's degree or a Doctor degree, he stated "In my opinion, I pursued university studies".

A radio anchor that hosted a live debate warned the candidate Alexandru Cumpănașu to tone down his language, or else he would be facing exclusion from the debate.

In an electoral show broadcast live by the Romanian public TV station TVR1, Alexandru Cumpănașu showed his skills of gun handling, by firing at sitting balloons. Later, he stated that the submachine gun he used "was a toy-gun".

For the first time in the history of democratic elections in Romania, the first two contenders did not participate in any electoral debate organised between them or together with other candidates.

=== Campaign financing ===
This is an overview of the money raised by each candidate, as it was reported to the Permanent Electoral Authority. Total raised are the sum of all contributions (private and public).

==== First round ====
For the first round, the candidates raised a total of 70,258,904.02 lei, including both private and public funding. Only the candidates that achieved at least 3% of the votes were entitled to be compensated for their private fundings from the state budget. According to Romanian law, the candidates that achieved less than 3% (highlighted in red, in the table below) are not entitled to public compensations. One candidate, Sebastian Popescu, claimed in his financial filing that he and his team did not spend any funds, saying that he used only the online environment for his campaign and no paid ads.

Candidate	Total raised (lei)	Private funding (lei)	Public funding (lei)	Efficiency (lei/1%)	Efficiency (lei/1 vote)
Klaus Iohannis	18,000,000.00	0.00	18,000,000.00	475,938.94	5.16
Viorica Dăncilă	18,210,500.00	1,672,500.00	16,538,000.00	818,081.76	8.88
Dan Barna	7,449,531.31	6,984,323.31	179,708.00	495,974.12	5.38
Mircea Diaconu	16,294,924.80	15,994,924.80	300,000.00	1,841,234.44	19.99
Theodor Paleologu	7,068,975.00	7,068,975.00	0.00	1,235,834.79	13.41
Hunor Kelemen	445,000.00	445,000.00	0.00	114,987.08	1.25
Ramona-Ioana Bruynseels	803,398.00	803,398.00	0.00	303,169.06	3.29
Alexandru Cumpănașu	559,174.91	559,174.91	0.00	365,473.80	3.96
Viorel Cataramă	1,300,000.00	1,300,000.00	0.00	2,452,830.19	26.71
Bogdan Stanoevici	20,000.00	20,000.00	0.00	47,619.05	0.51
Cătălin Ivan	14,400.00	14,400.00	0.00	40,000.00	0.44
Ninel Peia	8,000.00	8,000.00	0.00	23,529.41	0.26
Sebastian Popescu	0.00	0.00	0.00	0.00	0.00
John Ion Banu	85,000.00	85,000.00	0.00	283,333.33	3.06
Total	70,258,904.02	34,955,696.02	35,303,208.00	702,589.04	7.62

==== Second round ====
For the second round, the two remaining candidates raised a total of 1,956,000 lei.

Candidate	Total raised (lei)	Private funding (lei)	Public funding (lei)	Efficiency (lei/1%)	Efficiency (lei/1 vote)
Klaus Iohannis	400,000.00	0.00	400,000.00	6,052.35	0.06
Viorica Dăncilă	1,556,000.00	1,456,800.00	99,200.00	45,886.17	0.47
Total	1,956,000.00	1,456,800.00	499,200.00	19,560.00	0.20

== Debates ==
Sites of the presidential debates

In order for a debate to be counted, there must be at least two candidates present. The following situations are not considered proper debates: one candidate with one or multiple interviewers; one candidate with a representative (or more) of other candidate(s); only representatives of candidates (no matter how many candidates were represented); one candidate debating a previously recorded video of other candidate(s); short live statements of a candidate (via telephone or video streaming) inserted during a show with only one (other) candidate; short coincidental encounters of candidates (in a non-previously organized debate) that spoke to each other (and were recorded, even on professional cameras in TV studios). Any debate must be publicly broadcast. Negotiations behind closed doors, "strategic meetings" among candidates or any other type of discreet talks are not proper debates, even if their content (or bits of it) was released to the public, with/without the candidates' approval of its release.

Debates may be broadcast on radio, television or internet. Candidates may show up in person or participate to the debate via telephone or video streaming for the entire debate time. Candidates that left the debate before 10% of the debate time elapsed (after few words or few minutes) are to be considered as absentees and their leaving noted as such. In this particular situation (if will occur), the debate is considered a valid one, because at least two candidates were present at its beginning. Candidates that left before the debate's ending are considered present, with their particular situation noted as such.

=== Schedule ===
Debate schedule
Debate	Date	Time (EET)	Viewers	Broadcast type	Location	Sponsor(s)	Moderator(s)	Reference(s)
1	16 October 2019	12–1 pm	TBA	live radio	Radio Romania, Casa Radio, Bucharest	Radio România Actualități	Iana Ioniță	
2	22 October 2019	6:30–7:30 pm	TBA	live TV	Romanian Television Regional Mureș HQ, Târgu Mureș	TVR3		
3	22 October 2019	8–9 pm	TBA	live TV	Realitatea TV studios, Willbrook Platinum Center, Bucharest	Realitatea TV	Denise Rifai	
4	24 October 2019	12–1 pm	TBA	live radio	Radio Romania, Casa Radio, Bucharest	Radio România Actualități	Iana Ioniță	
5	24 October 2019	5:15–6:30 pm	TBA	live TV	Național TV studios, "Național Media" Center, Bucharest	Național TV	Denis Ciulinaru, Mircea Coșea	
6	25 October 2019	5:15–6:30 pm	TBA	live TV	Național TV studios, "Național Media" Center, Bucharest	Național TV	Denis Ciulinaru, Mircea Coșea	
7	25 October 2019	8–9 pm	425,000	live TV	Antena 3 studios, IRIDE Business Park, Bucharest	Antena 3	Răzvan Dumitrescu	
8	26 October 2019	1–3 pm	346 online viewers (Facebook), 150-200 present on location	video streaming, public forum	Agora Events Center, Iași	Youth Summit	unspecified name	
9	27 October 2019	1–2 pm	TBA	live TV	Antena 3 studios, IRIDE Business Park, Bucharest	Antena 3	Mihaela Bîrzilă	
10	30 October 2019	4–5 pm	TBA	live TV	București TV studio, Romexpo, G6 pavilion, Bucharest	București TV	Victor Preda	
11	1 November 2019	4–5:45 pm	TBA	live TV	B1 studio, Adriatica building, Bucharest	B1 TV	Tudor Barbu	
12	2 November 2019	5–6 pm	TBA	live TV	Antena 3 studios, IRIDE Business Park, Bucharest	Antena 3	Maria Coman	
13	4 November 2019	8–9 pm	TBA	live TV	Romanian Television HQ, Bucharest	TVR1	Ionuț Cristache	
14	7 November 2019	5:15–6:30 pm	TBA	live TV	Național TV studios, "Național Media" Center, Bucharest	Național TV	Denis Ciulinaru, Mircea Coșea	
15	7 November 2019	8:30–10:30 pm	882,244 online viewers (YouTube and media websites); 721.000 online viewers (Facebook)	live radio, video streaming	Europa FM HQ, Bucharest	Europa FM	Moise Guran	
16	7 November 2019	9–10 pm	TBA	live TV	Romanian Television HQ, Bucharest	TVR1	Ionuț Cristache	
17	8 November 2019	7–8 pm	TBA	live TV	Antena 3 studios, IRIDE Business Park, Bucharest	Antena 3	Răzvan Dumitrescu	
18	8 November 2019	9–10 pm	TBA	live TV	Romanian Television HQ, Bucharest	TVR1	Ionuț Cristache	

=== Participation ===
The following is a table of participating candidates in each debate:

Participating candidates
Candidate
Candidate	P Present N Not invited/Invitation declined A Absent (Invitation accepted, but candidate failed to show up)																		Total	Interaction
Candidate	1	2	3	4	5	6	7	8	9	10	11	12	13	14	15	16	17	18	Total	Interaction
Iohannis	N	N	N	N	N	N	N	N	N	N	N	N	N	N	A	N	N	N	0	0/13
Dăncilă	N	N	N	N	N	N	N	N	N	N	N	N	N	N	A	N	N	N	0	0/13
Barna	A	N	N	N	N	N	N	N	N	N	N	N	N	N	P	N	N	N	1	2/13
Diaconu	N	N	N	N	N	N	N	N	N	N	N	N	N	N	A	N	P	P	2	3/13
Paleologu	N	N	P	N	N	N	N	P	N	N	N	N	P	N	P	N	N	N	4	3/13
Kelemen	N	N	P	A	N	N	N	P	N	N	N	N	N	N	P	N	N	N	3	2/13
Bruynseels	N	N	N	N	N	P	N	N	N	P	N	P	N	P	N	N	P	N	5	5/13
Cumpănașu	N	P	N	P	N	N	P	N	P	N	N	P	N	N	N	N	P	P	7	6/13
Cataramă	N	P	N	N	N	N	P	N	N	N	N	N	N	N	N	N	N	N	2	1/13
Stanoevici	N	N	N	N	N	P	N	N	P	P	N	N	N	N	N	N	N	N	3	3/13
Ivan	N	N	N	P	P	N	N	N	N	N	P	P	P	P	N	N	N	N	6	6/13
Peia	P	N	N	P	N	P	N	N	P	N	N	N	N	N	N	N	P	N	5	7/13
Popescu	P	N	N	N	P	N	N	N	N	N	N	N	N	N	N	P	N	N	3	3/13
Banu	P	N	N	N	N	N	N	N	N	N	P	N	N	N	N	P	N	N	3	3/13
Electoral Coverage	0.97	2.06	9.59	2.23	0.69	3.41	2.06	9.59	2.29	3.07	0.66	4.54	6.08	3.01	24.61	0.63	13.37	10.38	—N/a	—N/a

== Opinion polls ==
=== First round ===
==== After the deadline for submitting candidacies to BEC (22 September 2019) ====
Poll source	Date(s)	Sample size	Iohannis	Dăncilă	Barna	Diaconu	Paleologu	Kelemen	Bruynseels	Cumpănașu	Cataramă	Stanoevici	Ivan	Peia	Popescu	Banu
(Romania) Election results (first round)			37.82%	22.26%	15.02%	8.85%	5.72%	3.87%	2.65%	1.53%	0.53%	0.42%	0.36%	0.34%	0.33%	0.30%
IRES	Exit-poll	—N/a	38.4%	21.9%	16.1%	8.3%	5.9%	4.7%	2.0%	1.1%	0.4%	0.4%	0.2%	0.3%	0.2%	0.1%
CURS-Avangarde	Exit-poll	—N/a	39.0%	22.1%	16.9%	7.8%	6.1%	4.0%	1.8%	1.1%	0.3%	0.2%	0.3%	0.2%	0.1%	0.1%
Sociopol	Exit-poll	—N/a	42%	18%	16%	10%	5%	3%	2%	2%	≤0.2%	0.5%	1%	≤0.2%	≤0.2%	≤0.2%
PSD	7 November 2019	—N/a	41%	26%	12%	7%	6%	2%	4%	2%	–	–	–	–	–	–
	4 November 2019	Orban sworn in as Prime Minister of Romania, following a vote of confidence from the parliament														
USR	25 October–3 November 2019	1,225	38.9%	22.6%	19.1%	8.2%	5.5%	3.6%	2.1%							
IMAS	8–28 October 2019	1,010	45.7%	15.1%	12.6%	16.7%	6.9%	2.9%	0.1%							
PMP	27 October 2019	—N/a	40%	19%	13%	7%	8%	4%	–	3%	1.5%					
USR	15–23 October 2019	1,500	39.0%	23.4%	18.5%	8.0%	3.8%	3.9%	3.4%							
Sociopol	11–22 October 2019	1,001	42%	21%	10%	10%	7%	1%	3%	5%	1%					
CURS	14–21 October 2019	1,600	37%	20%	13%	11%	6%	4%	4%	4%	1%					
BCS	12–19 October 2019	1,117	40.2%	19.9%	12.2%	7.6%	7.6%	5.2%	2.1%	4.1%	0.7%	0.2%	0.2%	0.1%		
PNL	17 October 2019	—N/a	40%	13%	12%	9%	7%	19%								
	10 October	Dăncilă ousted as Prime Minister of Romania, following a vote of no confidence from the parliament														
Sociopol	6 October 2019	—N/a	43%	21%	15%	11%	4%	6%								
PSD	4 October 2019	—N/a	40%	18%	20%	13%	7%	2%								
IMAS	9–28 September 2019	1,010	45.3%	12.4%	14.2%	16.6%	7.7%	3.8%	–	–	–	–	–	–	–	–
USR	3–24 September 2019	1,500	40.5%	21.4%	19.7%	7.6%	3.5%	3.1%	4.2%							

==== Before the deadline for submitting candidacies to BEC (22 September 2019) ====
Poll source	Date(s)	Sample size	Iohannis	Dăncilă	Diaconu	Barna	Paleologu	Kelemen	Ponta	Tăriceanu	Crețu	Tomac	Mioc	Cioloș	Kövesi	Dragnea	Teodorovici	Firea	Orban	Diaconescu	Others	Undecided
Socio-Data	16–20 September 2019	1,070	40	19	16	15	5	3	endorsed Diaconu			endorsed Paleologu		endorsed Barna	–	—N/a	endorsed Dăncilă		endorsed Iohannis	–	2	—N/a
Socio-Data	9–13 September 2019	1,070	46	17	14	11	4	2	endorsed Diaconu			endorsed Paleologu		endorsed Barna	–	—N/a	endorsed Dăncilă		endorsed Iohannis	–	6	—N/a
Socio-Data	2–6 September 2019	1,070	49	14	14	12	6	3	endorsed Diaconu			endorsed Paleologu		endorsed Barna	–	—N/a	endorsed Dăncilă		endorsed Iohannis	–	2	—N/a
	30 August 2019	Kelemen officially announced his candidacy																				
Verifield	26–30 August 2019	1,000	43	18	14	15	6	1	endorsed Diaconu			endorsed Paleologu		endorsed Barna	–	—N/a	endorsed Dăncilă		endorsed Iohannis	–	3	—N/a
Socio-Data	26–30 August 2019	1,070	43	16	18	15	6	1	endorsed Diaconu			endorsed Paleologu		endorsed Barna	–	—N/a	endorsed Dăncilă		endorsed Iohannis	–	3	—N/a
	27 August 2019	Diaconu officially announced his candidacy																				
	26 August 2019	ALDE withdrew from governmental coalition and moved to opposition																				
	25 August 2019	Paleologu officially announced his candidacy																				
IMAS	5–28 August 2019	1,010	44.6	8.4	—N/a	17.3	—N/a	2.4	14.0	12.7	–	0.6	–	endorsed Barna	–	—N/a	endorsed Dăncilă		endorsed Iohannis	–	–	—N/a
CURS	19 July–5 August 2019	1,600	39	14	—N/a	17	—N/a	4	–	18	–	–	–	endorsed Barna	–	—N/a	endorsed Dăncilă		endorsed Iohannis	–	8	—N/a
IMAS	15 July–2 August 2019	1,010	41.7	7.5	—N/a	9.4	—N/a	2.8	12.9	13.8	–	1.5	–	10.4	–	—N/a	endorsed Dăncilă		endorsed Iohannis	–	–	—N/a
	23 July 2019	Dăncilă officially announced her candidacy																				
BCS	17-23 July 2019	1,128	41.8	16.1	—N/a	15.7	—N/a	4.9	–	13.9	–	4.2	–	–	–	—N/a	endorsed Dăncilă		endorsed Iohannis	–	3.5	—N/a
	13 July 2019	Barna officially announced his candidacy																				
CURS	28 June–8 July 2019	1,067	41	–	—N/a	9	—N/a	2	–	21	4	–	–	–	11	—N/a	5	–	endorsed Iohannis	–	7	23
IMAS	7–26 June 2019	1,010	42.4	6.7	—N/a	5.3	—N/a	1.8	14.1	15.5	–	1.6	–	12.7	–	—N/a	–	–	endorsed Iohannis	–	–	—N/a
	27 May 2019	Dragnea convicted to three and a half years in prison; political rights suspended																				
	26 May 2019	(European Union) European elections: Diaconu did not run for re-election; Crețu, Tomac and Cioloș were elected MEPs																				
IMAS	2–20 May 2019	1,010	43.5	—N/a	—N/a	1.9	—N/a	1.2	11.6	19.8	–	2.1	–	13.0	–	7.0	—N/a	–	endorsed Iohannis	–	–	—N/a
INSCOP	12 April–3 May 2019	1,050	45.8	—N/a	—N/a	–	—N/a	3.2	–	18.0	6.5	–	–	9.9	–	14.3	—N/a	–	endorsed Iohannis	–	2.2	—N/a
IMAS	12–25 April 2019	1,010	42.7	—N/a	—N/a	2.5	—N/a	1.2	14.5	18.3	–	2.2	–	10.0	–	8.7	—N/a	–	endorsed Iohannis	–	–	—N/a
IMAS	18 March–3 April 2019	1,010	44.3	—N/a	—N/a	1.7	—N/a	1.1	12.4	16.1	–	2.2	–	11.7	–	8.0	—N/a	–	2.5	–	–	—N/a
CURS	12–25 March 2019	1,067	36	—N/a	—N/a	–	—N/a	4	–	23	6	3	–	9	–	15	—N/a	–	–	–	4	26
IMAS	1–21 February 2019	1,010	41.4	—N/a	—N/a	1.5	—N/a	1.5	15.0	18.0	–	1.9	–	11.7	–	6.0	—N/a	–	3.0	–	–	—N/a
CURS	21 January–6 February 2019	1,067	41	—N/a	—N/a	4	—N/a	–	–	21	–	–	–	9	–	17	—N/a	–	–	–	8	34
IMAS	11–30 January 2019	1,011	34.4	—N/a	—N/a	1.9	—N/a	0.8	13.2	15.4	–	1.5	–	10.9	–	6.0	—N/a	–	2.3	–	5.4	8.2
PNL	27 January 2019	26,000	30	—N/a	—N/a	–	—N/a	3	12	16	–	–	–	10	–	–	—N/a	17	–	–	12	–
	17 January 2019	Crețu resigns from PSD and joins Pro Romania																				
IMAS	4–20 December 2018	1,010	34.9	—N/a	—N/a	2.3	—N/a	0.7	12.7	12.9	–	1.8	–	9.2	–	5.3	—N/a	–	3.5	–	–	16.8
	18 December 2018	Cioloș joins PLUS, soon to become its president																				
CURS	24 November–9 December 2018	1,067	39	—N/a	—N/a	3	—N/a	2	–	25	–	–	–	11	–	12	—N/a	–	–	–	8	32
CURS	20 September–1 October 2018	1,067	40	—N/a	—N/a	–	—N/a	2	–	29	–	1	–	10	–	13	—N/a	–	–	–	5	33
	9 July 2018	Kövesi was revoked from the office of Chief Prosecutor of the National Anticorruption Directorate, following the request of the Justice Minister																				
CURS	23 June–1 July 2018	1,067	43	—N/a	—N/a	–	—N/a	3	–	22	–	2	–	10	–	12	—N/a	–	–	–	8	28
	23 June 2018	Iohannis officially announced his candidacy																				
CURS	27 April–8 May 2018	1,067	39	—N/a	—N/a	–	—N/a	3	–	22	–	2	–	4	–	22	—N/a	–	–	–	8	39
	29 January 2018	Dăncilă sworn in as Prime Minister of Romania																				
	16 January 2018	Tudose resigned as Prime Minister of Romania, following PSD retracted the political support																				
CURS	23 November 2017	1,067	37	—N/a	—N/a	3	—N/a	4	–	13	–	–	1	–	–	–	—N/a	37	–	5	–	32
	4 September 2017	Ponta joins Pro Romania, soon to become its president																				
	29 June 2017	Tudose sworn in as Prime Minister of Romania, following a vote of confidence from the parliament																				
	21 June 2017	Grindeanu ousted from the office of Prime Minister of Romania, following a vote of no confidence from the parliament																				
	16 June 2017	Ponta excluded from PSD, following his nomination as minister in the Grindeanu Cabinet																				
	4 January 2017	Grindeanu sworn in as Prime Minister of Romania, following legislative elections																				
	11 December 2016	(Romania) Legislative elections: Tăriceanu and Teodorovici elected senators; Barna, Kelemen, Ponta, Dragnea and Tomac elected deputies; Paleologu, Peia and Orban did not run for re-election																				
	23 June 2016	(Romania) Local elections: Firea elected Mayor of Bucharest																				
	17 November 2015	Cioloș (independent) sworn in as Prime Minister of Romania, following a vote of confidence from the parliament																				
	5 November 2015	Ponta resigned as Prime Minister of Romania, following public protests caused by Colectiv nightclub fire																				
	19 June 2015	ALDE founded from the merger of PLR and PC; Tăriceanu becomes its co-president																				
	21 December 2014	Iohannis assumed the office of president of Romania																				
(Romania) 2014 elections		round 2	54.43	—N/a	—N/a	—N/a	—N/a	—N/a	45.56	—N/a	—N/a	—N/a	—N/a	—N/a	—N/a	—N/a	—N/a	—N/a	—N/a	—N/a	—N/a	—N/a
(Romania) 2014 elections		round 1	30.37	—N/a	—N/a	—N/a	—N/a	3.47	40.44	5.36	—N/a	—N/a	—N/a	—N/a	—N/a	—N/a	—N/a	—N/a	—N/a	—N/a	20.36	—N/a

==== In-depths polling analysis ====
Candidate	Election results	Exit-polls	Last 1–30 days	Last 31–60 days	Last 61–90 days	Last 3–6 months	Last 6–9 months	Last 9–12 months
Klaus Iohannis	37.82% ▼	38.4-42% ▼	37-45.7% ▼	40-46% ▼	43-49% ▲	39-43.5%	36-45.8% ▲36-46.8% ▲ (Note: Ludovic Orban's support added)	30-41% 30-41%^{[a]}
Viorica Dăncilă	22.26% ▲	18-22.1% ▲	13-26% ▲	12.4-21.4% ▲	8.4-18% ▲	6.7-14% ▼5-14% ▼ (Note: Liviu Dragnea's and Eugen Teodorovici's support added)	not polled 6-15% ▼ (Note: Preceded by Liviu Dragnea's support)	not polled 5.3-17% (Note: Preceded by Liviu Dragnea's and Gabriela Firea's support)
Dan Barna	15.02% ▼	16-16.9% ▲	10-19.1% ▼	11-20% ▲	12-17.3% ▲	1.9-17% ▲9-19.8% ▲ (Note: Dacian Cioloș' support added)	1.5-2.5% ▼9-13.4% ▼ (Note: Dacian Cioloș' support added)	1.9-4% 10-14% (Note: Dacian Cioloș' support added)
Mircea Diaconu	8.85%	7.8-10% ▼	7-16.7% ▼	7.6-16.6% ▼	14-18% ▼14-26.7% ▼ (Note: Victor Ponta's and Călin Popescu Tăriceanu's support added)	not polled 18-31.4% ▼ (Note: Preceded by Victor Ponta's, Călin Popescu Tăriceanu's and Corina Crețu's support)	not polled 24.5-33% ▲ (Note: Preceded by Victor Ponta's, Călin Popescu Tăriceanu's and Corina Crețu's support)	not polled 21-28.6% (Note: Preceded by Victor Ponta's and Călin Popescu Tăriceanu's support)
Theodor Paleologu	5.72% ▲	5-6.1% ▼	3.8-8% ▲	3.5-7.7% ▼	6% ▲0.6-6% ▲ (Note: Eugen Tomac's support added)	not polled 1.5-2.1% ▼ (Note: Preceded by Eugen Tomac's support)	not polled 1.9-3% ▲ (Note: Preceded by Eugen Tomac's support)	not polled 1.5-1.8% (Note: Preceded by Eugen Tomac's support)
Kelemen Hunor	3.87%	3-4.7% ▲	1-5.2% ▲	2-3.8% ▲	1-3% ▼	1.2-4%	1.1-4% ▲	0.7-3%
Ramona-Ioana Bruynseels	2.65% ▲	1.8-2% ▼	2.1-4%	not polled	not polled	not polled	not polled	not polled
Alexandru Cumpănașu	1.53%	1.1-2% ▼	2-5%	not polled	not polled	not polled	not polled	not polled
Viorel Cataramă	0.53% ▲	0.3-0.4% ▼	0.7%	not polled	not polled	not polled	not polled	not polled
Bogdan Stanoevici	0.42% ▲	0.2-0.4% ▲	0.2%	not polled	not polled	not polled	not polled	not polled
Cătălin Ivan	0.36% ▼	0.2-1% ▲	0.2%	not polled	not polled	not polled	not polled	not polled
Ninel Peia	0.34% ▲	0.2-0.3% ▲	<0.1%	not polled	not polled	not polled	not polled	not polled
Sebastian Popescu	0.33% ▲	0.1-0.2% ▲	<0.1%	not polled	not polled	not polled	not polled	not polled
John Ion Banu	0.30% ▲	0.1% ▲	<0.1%	not polled	not polled	not polled	not polled	not polled

==== Graphical summary ====
The following graph depicts the evolution of the standing of each candidate in the poll aggregators since December 2018. The last value is the exit-polls average.

View source data.

===== Polling aggregation =====
The following graph depicts the evolution of the standing of each present candidate, including former party candidates and alliance candidates since December 2018. Klaus Iohannis includes Ludovic Orban's previous evolution, Viorica Dăncilă includes Liviu Dragnea's previous evolution with Eugen Teodorovici's and Gabriela Firea's previous support, Theodor Paleologu includes Eugen Tomac's previous evolution, Dan Barna's evolution is aggregated with Dacian Cioloș' evolution and Mircea Diaconu's evolution is aggregated with Victor Ponta's, Corina Crețu's and Călin Popescu-Tăriceanu's added evolution. The last value is the exit-polls average.

View source data.

=== Second round ===
==== Iohannis vs. Dăncilă ====
Poll source	Date(s)	Sample size	Iohannis	Dăncilă	Margin of error
(Romania) Election results (second round)			66.09%	33.91%	—N/a
CURS-Avangarde	Exit-poll	23,000+	64.5%	35.5%	±2.5%
Sociopol	Exit-poll	—N/a	67%	33%	±2.56%
IRES	Exit-poll	—N/a	67.1%	32.9%	±2%
PSD	11 November 2019	—N/a	66%	34%	—N/a
BCS	12–19 October 2019	1,117	70.5%	29.5%	±3%
CURS	27 August–2 September 2019	1,067	65%	35%	±3%

==== Iohannis vs. Barna ====
Poll source	Date(s)	Sample size	Iohannis	Barna	Undecided	None	Margin of error
USR	15–23 October 2019	—N/a	39.8% ▲	24.0% ▼	27.4%	8.8% ▼	—N/a
BCS	12–19 October 2019	1,117	69.1%	30.9%	17.6%	20.1%	±3%
USR	3–24 September 2019	1,500	44.2%	22.2%	27.5%	6.0%	—N/a
CURS	27 August–2 September 2019	1,067	63%	37%	—N/a	—N/a	±3%

==== Iohannis vs. Diaconu ====
Poll source	Date(s)	Sample size	Iohannis	Diaconu	Margin of error
BCS	12–19 October 2019	1,117	67.2%	32.8%	±3%
CURS	27 August–2 September 2019	1,067	62%	38%	±3%

==== Iohannis vs. Tăriceanu ====
Poll source	Date(s)	Sample size	Iohannis	Tăriceanu	Undecided	None	Margin of error
INSCOP	12 April–3 May 2019	1,050	38.1%	26.0%	26.8%	9.0%	±3%

==== Iohannis vs. Cioloș ====
Poll source	Date(s)	Sample size	Iohannis	Cioloș	Undecided	None	Margin of error
INSCOP	12 April–3 May 2019	1,050	33.7%	14.6%	38.0%	13.7%	±3%

==== Iohannis vs. Dragnea ====
Poll source	Date(s)	Sample size	Iohannis	Dragnea	Undecided	None	Margin of error
INSCOP	12 April–3 May 2019	1,050	41.6%	18.0%	29.1%	11.2%	±3%

==== Iohannis vs. Firea ====
Poll source	Date(s)	Sample size	Iohannis	Firea	Undecided	None	Margin of error
INSCOP	12 April–3 May 2019	1,050	37.4% ▲	21% ▼	31.3%	10.3%	±3%
Avangarde	3–12 May 2017	800	40%	44%	6%	10%	±3.47%

== Results ==
The first round of voting was held on 10 November 2019. Incumbent president Klaus Iohannis, of the ruling National Liberal Party (PNL) led the field with 37.8 percent, with former Prime Minister Viorica Dăncilă, of the opposition Social Democratic Party (PSD) finishing second with 22.26 percent. Because no candidate obtained the support of more than 50% of registered voters, the second round was held two weeks later, on 24 November 2019, between Iohannis and Dăncilă. Exit polls on election night showed Iohannis winning handily. He ultimately finished with 66.09 percent of the vote, the second-highest vote share for a winning presidential candidate in direct, popular elections in Romania's democratic history since 1990 onwards.

Dan Barna openly endorsed Iohannis in the second round. Theodor Paleologu positioned himself as against Dăncilă, without openly endorsing Klaus Iohannis (his party, PMP, openly endorsed Klaus Iohannis). Kelemen Hunor openly endorsed Iohannis in the second round (his organization, UDMR/RMDSZ, position itself as non-partisan). Alexandru Cumpănașu positioned himself against Dăncilă, without openly endorsing Iohannis on the other hand however.

Candidate	Party	First round		Second round	
Candidate	Party	Votes	%	Votes	%
Klaus Iohannis	Independent (PNL)	3,485,292	37.82	6,509,135	66.09
Viorica Dăncilă	Social Democratic Party	2,051,725	22.26	3,339,922	33.91
Dan Barna	2020 USR-PLUS Alliance	1,384,450	15.02		
Mircea Diaconu	Alliance for "One Man" (PRO–ALDE)	815,201	8.85		
Theodor Paleologu	People's Movement Party	527,098	5.72		
Hunor Kelemen	Democratic Alliance of Hungarians in Romania	357,014	3.87		
Ramona-Ioana Bruynseels	Humanist Power Party	244,275	2.65		
Alexandru Cumpănașu	Independent	141,316	1.53		
Viorel Cataramă	Liberal Right Party	48,662	0.53		
Bogdan Stanoevici	Independent	39,192	0.43		
Cătălin Ivan	Alternative for National Dignity	32,787	0.36		
Ninel Peia	Romanian Nationhood Party	30,884	0.34		
Sebastian Popescu	New Romania Party	30,850	0.33		
John Ion Banu	Romanian Nation Party	27,769	0.30		
Total		9,216,515	100.00	9,849,057	100.00
Valid votes		9,216,515	98.47	9,849,057	98.18
Invalid/blank votes		142,961	1.53	182,648	1.82
Total votes		9,359,476	100.00	10,031,705	100.00
Registered voters/turnout		18,286,865	51.18	18,217,411	55.07
Source: BEC (first round); BEC (second round)

Vote share
Second round
Iohannis	66.09%
Dăncilă	33.91%
First round
Iohannis	37.82%
Dăncilă	22.26%
Barna	15.02%
Diaconu	8.85%
Paleologu	5.72%
Kelemen	3.87%
Bruynseels	2.65%
Cumpănașu	1.53%
Others	2.29%

=== By county ===
==== First round ====
County	Iohannis (PNL)	Dăncilă (PSD)	Barna (USR-PLUS)	Diaconu (PRO-ALDE)	Paleologu (PMP)	Kelemen (UDMR)	Bruynseels (PPU)	Cumpănașu (Ind.)	Cataramă (DL)	Stanoevici (Ind.)	Ivan (ADN)	Peia (PNeR)	Popescu (PNR)	Banu (PNRo)
Alba	51.76%	17.33%	11.40%	6.23%	5.32%	2.25%	2.71%	1.04%	0.62%	0.27%	0.33%	0.22%	0.24%	0.30%
Arad	43.30%	17.29%	13.97%	8.19%	6.74%	4.18%	2.83%	1.49%	0.50%	0.39%	0.24%	0.30%	0.29%	0.29%
Argeș	30.19%	30.88%	12.31%	14.03%	5.12%	0.26%	3.18%	1.76%	0.57%	0.44%	0.31%	0.32%	0.32%	0.33%
Bacău	36.98%	25.68%	13.07%	9.96%	5.26%	0.72%	3.32%	1.57%	0.98%	0.50%	0.54%	0.52%	0.48%	0.43%
Bihor	36.03%	18.59%	11.40%	7.89%	5.63%	15.39%	2.21%	1.11%	0.42%	0.27%	0.24%	0.31%	0.24%	0.26%
Bistrița-Năsăud	48.76%	20.05%	10.22%	5.97%	6.15%	3.13%	2.45%	1.07%	0.40%	0.25%	0.61%	0.25%	0.31%	0.38%
Botoșani	31.08%	34.16%	8.79%	12.46%	4.61%	0.48%	3.13%	1.85%	1.16%	0.45%	0.54%	0.38%	0.48%	0.43%
Brașov	41.92%	15.21%	18.05%	9.68%	5.38%	3.31%	2.76%	1.25%	0.47%	0.49%	0.48%	0.36%	0.33%	0.29%
Brăila	33.24%	31.12%	9.58%	12.15%	4.66%	0.36%	3.89%	1.89%	0.80%	0.58%	0.55%	0.38%	0.43%	0.38%
Bucharest	31.77%	17.89%	24.83%	11.30%	8.07%	0.21%	2.48%	1.16%	0.53%	0.67%	0.28%	0.39%	0.25%	0.17%
Buzău	29.69%	34.56%	9.78%	13.42%	4.27%	0.31%	3.63%	1.75%	0.65%	0.43%	0.39%	0.39%	0.37%	0.38%
Caraș-Severin	38.48%	30.86%	8.70%	9.10%	5.66%	0.57%	3.01%	1.36%	0.50%	0.43%	0.29%	0.29%	0.37%	0.39%
Călărași	37.62%	31.84%	9.16%	9.32%	3.69%	0.34%	3.06%	2.26%	0.68%	0.45%	0.39%	0.45%	0.41%	0.33%
Cluj	42.09%	10.43%	20.18%	5.94%	8.70%	7.80%	2.52%	0.72%	0.43%	0.27%	0.19%	0.25%	0.24%	0.23%
Constanța	40.15%	20.24%	15.77%	9.73%	6.43%	0.26%	3.09%	1.65%	0.66%	0.56%	0.35%	0.37%	0.41%	0.32%
Covasna	16.66%	6.91%	5.95%	3.91%	2.04%	61.39%	3.09%	1.65%	0.28%	0.23%	0.17%	0.19%	0.21%	0.22%
Dâmbovița	35.77%	32.49%	9.64%	10.18%	4.74%	0.26%	2.56%	1.81%	0.68%	0.41%	0.47%	0.25%	0.35%	0.38%
Dolj	31.96%	36.87%	11.40%	9.76%	3.79%	0.28%	2.31%	1.67%	0.48%	0.32%	0.33%	0.28%	0.27%	0.27%
Galați	34.44%	27.17%	13.31%	11.38%	5.73%	0.37%	3.46%	1.63%	0.53%	0.52%	0.39%	0.32%	0.37%	0.38%
Giurgiu	30.50%	42.85%	7.65%	9.89%	3.06%	0.29%	2.13%	1.61%	0.46%	0.41%	0.34%	0.25%	0.32%	0.23%
Gorj	30.06%	37.54%	9.83%	9.48%	5.22%	0.48%	3.33%	1.54%	0.44%	0.33%	0.88%	0.23%	0.35%	0.30%
Harghita	9.45%	4.10%	3.75%	1.83%	1.19%	77.73%	0.72%	0.32%	0.17%	0.12%	0.11%	0.24%	0.15%	0.13%
Hunedoara	34.40%	29.73%	11.06%	9.81%	5.08%	1.82%	4.35%	1.40%	0.57%	0.48%	0.32%	0.37%	0.33%	0.29%
Ialomița	32.13%	32.71%	11.11%	11.73%	4.22%	0.44%	3.05%	2.09%	0.64%	0.43%	0.37%	0.33%	0.40%	0.35%
Iași	36.30%	21.35%	17.87%	9.53%	7.85%	0.28%	2.60%	1.52%	0.51%	0.41%	0.74%	0.36%	0.37%	0.31%
Ilfov	39.27%	18.57%	19.46%	9.55%	6.32%	0.21%	2.61%	1.57%	0.60%	0.61%	0.28%	0.43%	0.31%	0.21%
Maramureș	40.08%	20.67%	13.85%	7.34%	7.97%	3.72%	2.93%	1.17%	0.42%	0.33%	0.31%	0.34%	0.33%	0.40%
Mehedinți	34.84%	39.79%	6.68%	9.76%	3.39%	0.40%	2.09%	1.21%	0.47%	0.29%	0.30%	0.30%	0.22%	0.26%
Mureș	34.81%	13.46%	11.10%	5.98%	3.69%	26.29%	2.16%	0.98%	0.30%	0.23%	0.25%	0.21%	0.26%	0.29%
Neamț	36.46%	26.09%	12.13%	11.12%	5.87%	0.41%	3.13%	1.74%	0.64%	0.52%	0.48%	0.47%	0.51%	0.42%
Olt	29.72%	42.99%	7.36%	8.05%	3.12%	0.28%	2.23%	4.42%	0.47%	0.28%	0.29%	0.26%	0.30%	0.23%
Prahova	38.71%	22.97%	14.08%	10.07%	6.03%	0.29%	3.30%	1.67%	0.67%	0.61%	0.47%	0.39%	0.40%	0.32%
Satu Mare	35.86%	15.45%	9.07%	6.14%	3.16%	26.22%	1.72%	0.77%	0.28%	0.21%	0.26%	0.20%	0.30%	0.37%
Sălaj	33.97%	17.74%	15.44%	5.68%	4.53%	17.82%	2.30%	0.79%	0.38%	0.19%	0.45%	0.19%	0.23%	0.29%
Sibiu	66.74%	9.71%	11.06%	4.93%	3.39%	0.78%	1.40%	0.61%	0.27%	0.20%	0.20%	0.26%	0.19%	0.27%
Suceava	39.33%	24.93%	10.74%	10.00%	7.04%	0.36%	2.80%	1.82%	0.75%	0.44%	0.48%	0.48%	0.46%	0.36%
Teleorman	30.09%	47.27%	6.56%	6.72%	3.78%	0.28%	2.12%	1.46%	0.43%	0.31%	0.29%	0.19%	0.27%	0.22%
Timiș	43.82%	13.94%	20.96%	7.41%	6.53%	1.46%	2.82%	1.11%	0.45%	0.38%	0.23%	0.28%	0.29%	0.32%
Tulcea	39.27%	23.40%	12.61%	9.97%	5.75%	0.46%	3.51%	1.99%	0.82%	0.49%	0.41%	0.34%	0.53%	0.44%
Vaslui	33.16%	32.24%	12.15%	9.16%	5.33%	0.57%	2.74%	1.98%	0.63%	0.35%	0.47%	0.33%	0.47%	0.43%
Vâlcea	36.61%	32.56%	10.05%	9.69%	4.27%	0.41%	2.82%	1.52%	0.34%	0.33%	0.30%	0.37%	0.35%	0.35%
Vrancea	40.74%	28.17%	10.07%	9.10%	4.79%	0.32%	2.65%	1.63%	0.62%	0.43%	0.38%	0.33%	0.42%	0.35%
Abroad	52.57%	2.68%	28.10%	3.61%	6.42%	0.51%	1.70%	2.43%	0.31%	0.42%	0.19%	0.36%	0.39%	0.30%
Source: HotNews

==== Second round ====
County	Iohannis (PNL)	Dăncilă (PSD)
Alba	73.43%	26.57%
Arad	69.66%	30.34%
Argeș	52.19%	47.81%
Bacău	62.02%	37.98%
Bihor	66.11%	33.89%
Bistrița-Năsăud	71.90%	28.10%
Botoșani	50.22%	49.78%
Brașov	73.55%	26.45%
Brăila	54.04%	45.96%
Bucharest	67.52%	32.48%
Buzău	50.38%	49.62%
Caraș-Severin	56.52%	43.48%
Călărași	53.91%	46.09%
Cluj	81.18%	18.82%
Constanța	68.47%	31.53%
Covasna	72.93%	27.07%
Dâmbovița	53.80%	46.20%
Dolj	51.79%	48.21%
Galați	60.18%	39.82%
Giurgiu	45.18%	54.82%
Gorj	48.10%	51.90%
Harghita	70.37%	29.63%
Hunedoara	54.79%	45.21%
Ialomița	52.21%	47.79%
Iași	66.21%	33.79%
Ilfov	68.23%	31.77%
Maramureș	68.12%	31.88%
Mehedinți	48.03%	51.97%
Mureș	73.60%	26.40%
Neamț	58.72%	41.28%
Olt	45.59%	54.41%
Prahova	64.39%	36.61%
Satu Mare	72.56%	27.44%
Sălaj	69.15%	30.85%
Sibiu	85.28%	14.72%
Suceava	61.35%	38.65%
Teleorman	40.83%	59.17%
Timiș	76.32%	23.64%
Tulcea	64.65%	35.35%
Vaslui	54.14%	45.86%
Vâlcea	53.59%	46.41%
Vrancea	59.30%	40.70%
Abroad	94.00%	6.00%
Source: HotNews

=== Gallery ===
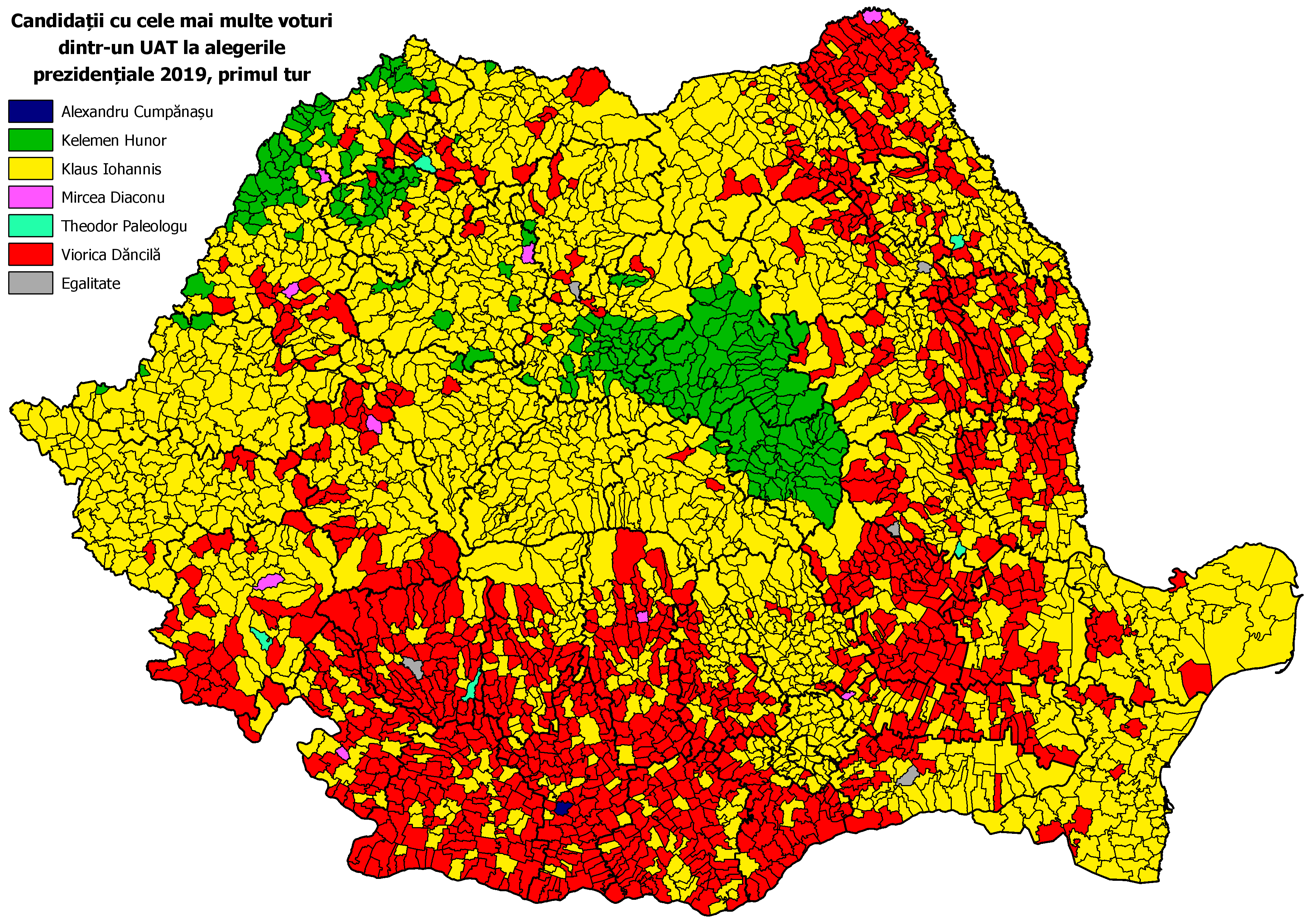
First round result by commune

Overall vote strength for both rounds

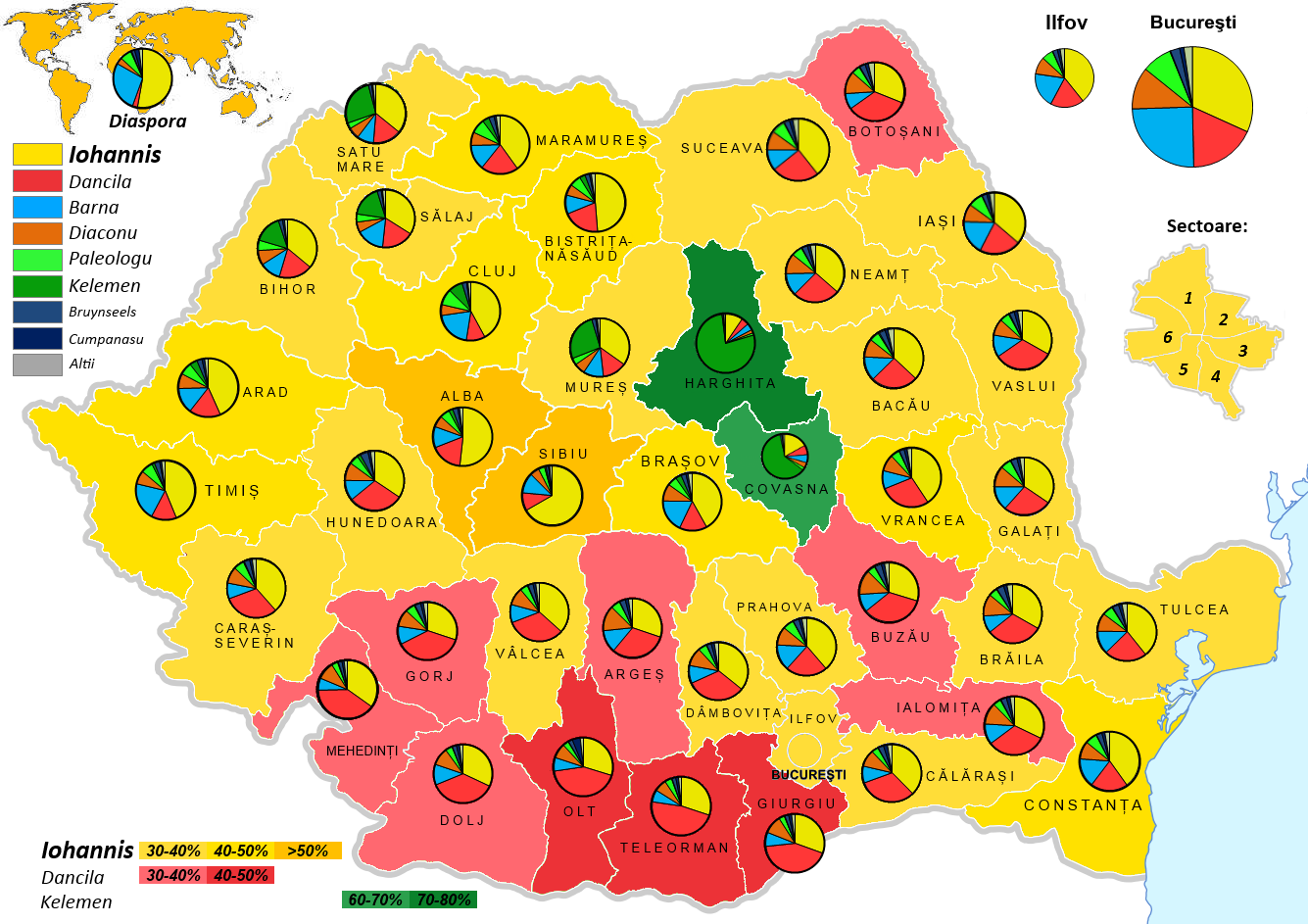
First round results

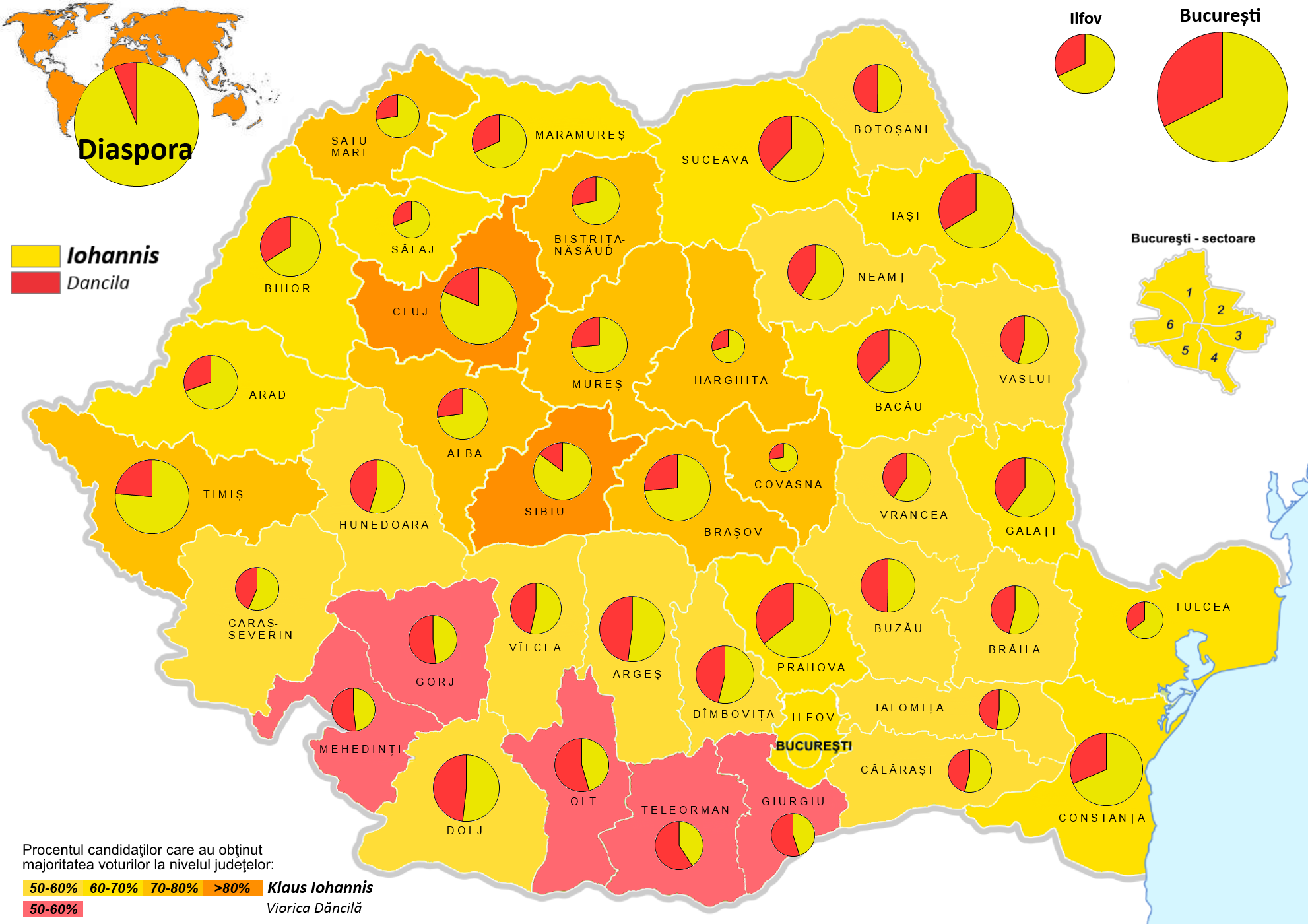
Second round results

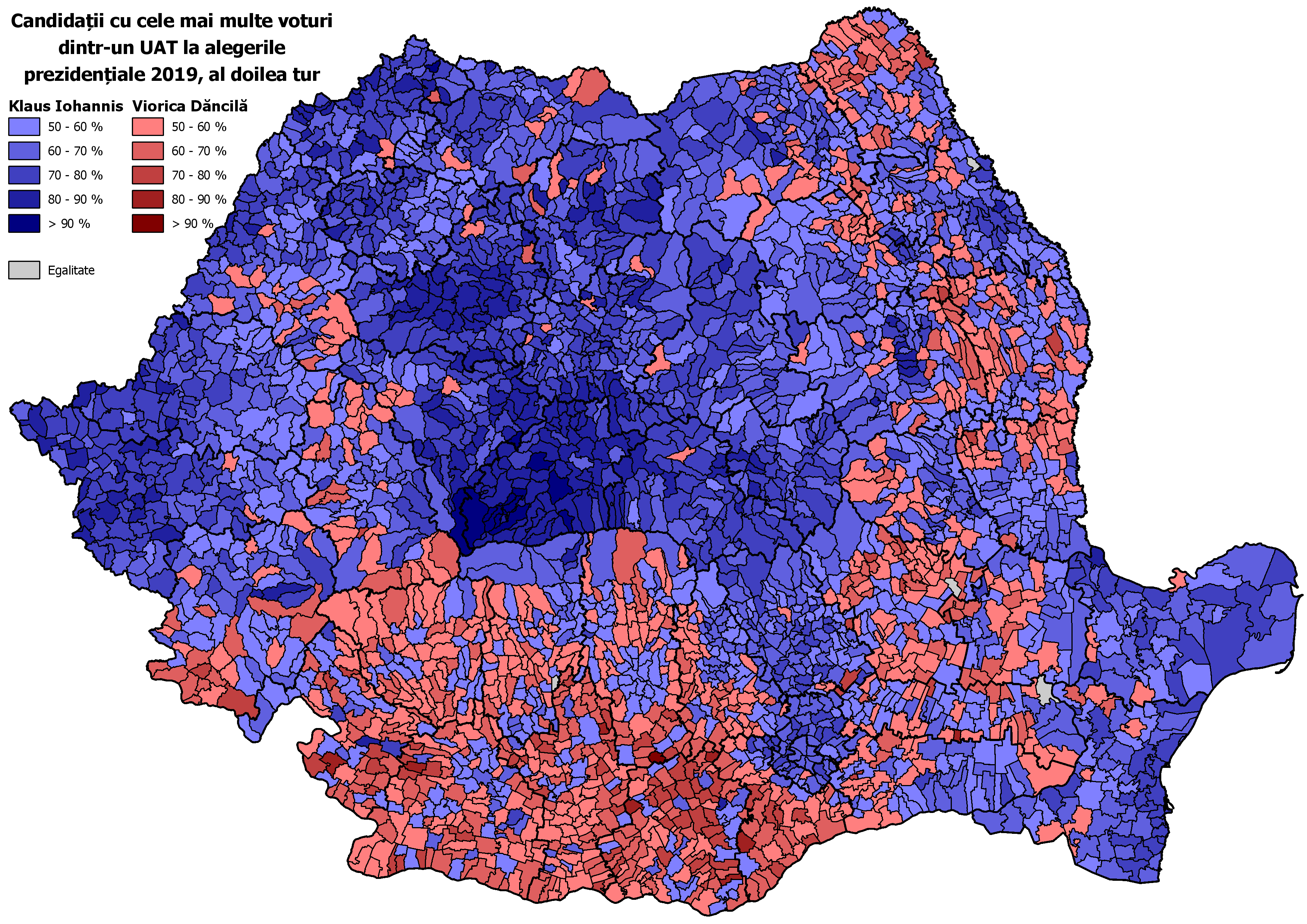
Second round results by commune
