= Cataramă =

Cataramă is a Romanian surname. Notable people with the surname include:

- Olimpia Cataramă (born 1940), Romanian athlete
- Viorel Cataramă (born 1955), Romanian businessman and politician
