= Theodor Paleologu =

Romanian historian, diplomat and politician

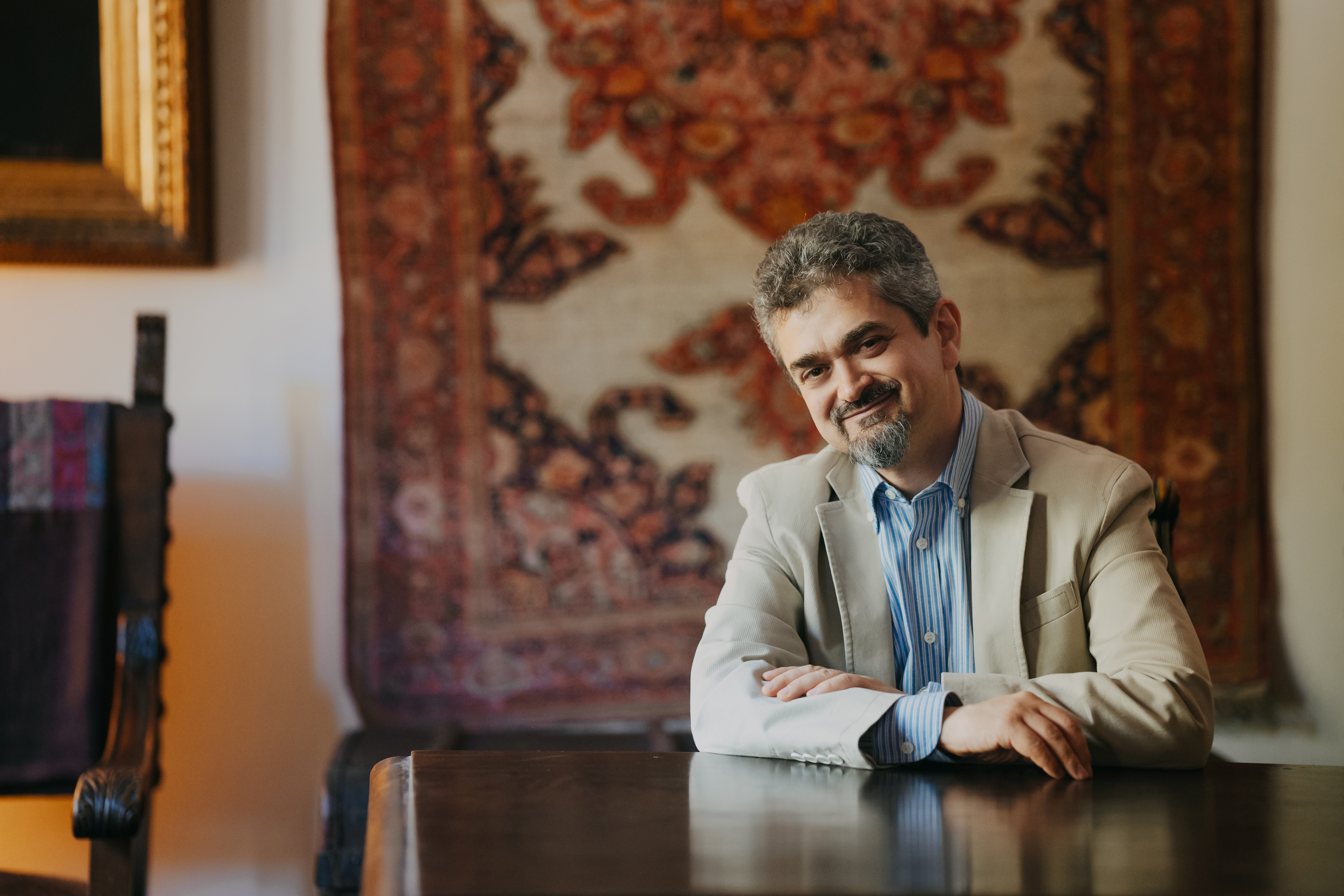
- Paleologu in 2024, at the Paleologu Foundation

Minister of Culture
- In office 22 December 2008 – 23 December 2009
- Prime Minister: Emil Boc
- Preceded by: Adrian Iorgulescu
- Succeeded by: Hunor Kelemen

Member of the Chamber of Deputies
- In office 30 November 2008 – 20 December 2016

Ambassador of Romania to Denmark
- In office 2005–2008

Personal details
- Born: July 15, 1973 (age 53) Bucharest, Socialist Republic of Romania
- Citizenship: Romanian, French
- Party: Independent
- Other political affiliations: Democratic Party (until 2007); Democratic Liberal Party (2007–2014); People's Movement Party (2014–2015); National Liberal Party (2015–2016)
- Spouse: Sarah Nassif (divorced)
- Children: 1
- Parent: Alexandru Paleologu (father)
- Education: Paris 1 Panthéon-Sorbonne University; École normale supérieure (Paris); School for Advanced Studies in the Social Sciences; LMU Munich

Theodor Paleologu (Romanian pronunciation: [teˈodor ˌpale.oˈloɡu]; born July 15, 1973) is a Romanian historian, diplomat and politician. An independent who was formerly a member of the National Liberal Party (PNL), the People's Movement Party (PMP) and the Democratic Liberal Party (PD-L), he was a member of the Romanian Chamber of Deputies for Bucharest from 2008 to 2016. Additionally, in the first Emil Boc cabinet (December 2008 to December 2009) he was Minister of Culture, Religious Affairs and Cultural Heritage.

== Early life ==
The son of Olimpia and Alexandru Paleologu, he was born in Bucharest and completed secondary studies at the city's German High School. He then attended Paris 1 Panthéon-Sorbonne University from 1992 to 1998, where he obtained undergraduate and master's degrees in philosophy. He also attended the École normale supérieure from 1996 to 2001. From 1998 to 2001, he worked on a doctorate in political sciences at the School for Advanced Studies in the Social Sciences and LMU Munich. He was a lecturer at Boston College from 1999 to 2000, a visiting professor at Deep Springs College in 2003, and a research fellow at the University of Notre Dame (2001–2002), New York University (2002), Harvard University (2002–2003), and the Berlin Institute for Advanced Study (2005). He was an external lecturer at the University of Copenhagen in 2007 and 2008, and since 2003, he has been assistant professor and director of the summer university at the European College of Liberal Arts in Berlin. Between 2005 and 2008, he served as Romania's ambassador to Denmark and Iceland; he resigned from the office in order to pursue his successful parliamentary campaign.

== Political activity ==
In the Chamber, he sat on the Arts, Culture and Mass Media Committee. As minister, his top priority was the preservation of Romania's historic monuments. His ministerial term ended when he was not reappointed to a new cabinet under Boc at the end of 2009. At the 2012 local election, he ran for mayor of Bucharest's Sector 1, finishing second with 14.1% of the vote. Running in the legislative election later that year, he placed second in his district, but won another term through the redistribution mechanism specified by the electoral law. In February 2014, he followed Elena Udrea in resigning from the PD-L and joining the People's Movement Party (PMP). A year later, he entered the National Liberal Party (PNL), proclaiming that the PMP had degenerated into a "total fiasco". In June 2016, the PNL expelled him after he criticized the party leadership for its disrespect toward Save Bucharest Union leader Nicușor Dan. Paleologu ran as an independent in the December election and won some 8,000 votes, well short of the approximately 25,000 needed to secure a seat.

By July 2019, Paleologu was a front-runner for the PMP nomination for the November presidential election. The following month, Mihail Neamțu withdrew from the party's internal race, endorsing Paleologu. He thus became the party’s candidate, placing fifth with 5.7% of the vote.

=== Presidential elections ===
Election	Affiliation	First round			Second round		
Election	Affiliation	Votes	Percentage	Position	Votes	Percentage	Position
2019	Independent (supported by PMP)	527,098	5.72%	5th	not qualified		

== Private life ==
Paleologu was married to Sarah Nassif, a French opera singer of Lebanese origin. The two are divorced and have one son, Mihail.

In 2013, he began holding private courses on the humanities and diplomacy in his family home. This venture eventually evolved into Casa Paleologu, which later branched out into online courses, conferences and study trips.

== Published works ==
- Despre conservatism, in the volume Nostalgia Europei, coordinated by Cristian Bădiliță and Tudorel Urian (Ed. Polirom, Iași, 2003) (On Conservatism).
- Joseph de Maistre sau bunul simț ca paradox, postface to the anthology Joseph de Maistre, Providență și istorie (Ed. Anastasia, București, 1998) (Joseph de Maistre, or Common Sense as Paradox).
- Sous l’œil du Grand Inquisiteur – katékhon ou Antéchrist? Contribution à la théologie politique (Éditions du Cerf, Paris, Collection „Passages“) (Under the Eye of the Grand Inquisitor – Katechon or Antichrist? A Contribution to Political Theology).
- De la Karl Marx la stenograme (Ed. Curtea Veche, București, 2005) (From Karl Marx to the Transcripts).
- Era supărăcioșilor (Ed. Curtea Veche, București, 2009) (The Age of the Touchy).
- Povestea Casei Paleologu (Ed. Fundației Paleologu, București, 2022) (The Story of Casa Paleologu).
- Leadership à la grecque de la Plutarh citire (Ed. Fundației Paleologu, București, 2023) (Leadership à la Grecque, as Read from Plutarch).
- Cum pregătim un discurs (Ed. Fundației Paleologu, București, 2023) (How to Prepare a Speech).
- Les pathologies du pouvoir – Pensées d’un convalescent (Ed. Les Éditions Ovadia, Paris, 2024) (The Pathologies of Power – Thoughts of a Convalescent).
- Patologiile puterii. Gândurile unui convalescent, original title: Les pathologies du pouvoir – Pensées d’un convalescent, Colecția Filosofii Agora, tr. Irinel Antoniu, Editura Trei, 2025, ISBN 978-606-40-2658-3 (The Pathologies of Power: Thoughts of a Convalescent).
