= Cătălin Ivan =

Romanian politician

Cătălin Ivan MEP
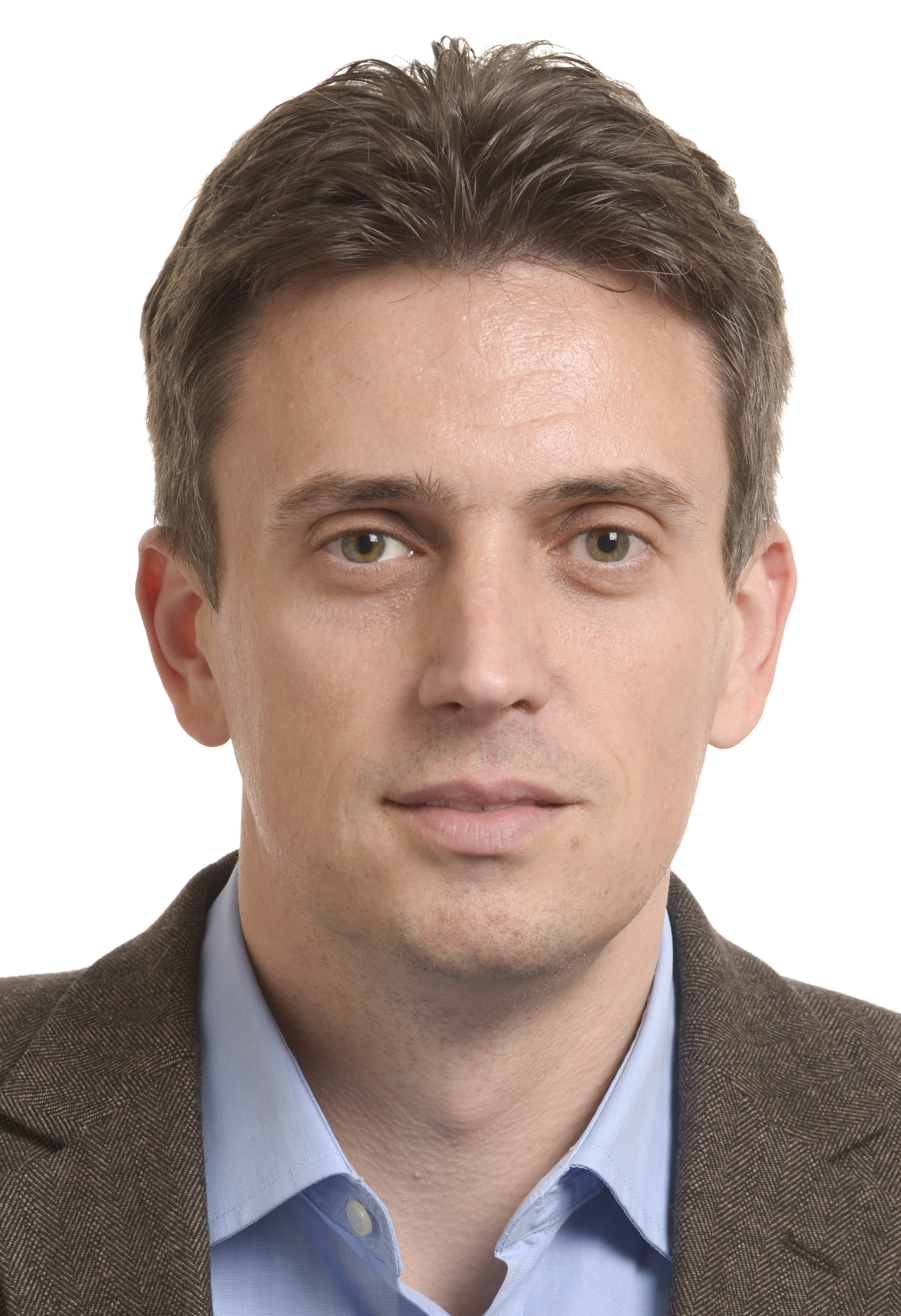

Member of the European Parliament for Romania
- In office 8 June 2009 – 1 July 2019 Serving with 32 others

Personal details
- Born: 23 December 1978 (age 47) Galaţi, Romania
- Party: Social Democratic Party (PSD)

Cătălin Sorin Ivan (born 23 December 1978) is a Romanian politician, who since the 2009 election has been a Member of the European Parliament for Romania, representing the Social Democratic Party (PSD). Until 2015 he was the Leader of the Romanian delegation to the Progressive Alliance of Socialists and Democrats Group in the European Parliament. Since 2019 he is the President of the Alternativa pentru Demnitate Națională (Alternative for National Dignity) Party.

== Parliamentary activities ==
He was the Vice-Chair of Delegation for relations with the countries of the Andean Community and also a member of the following committees of the European Parliament:

- Committee on Budgetary Control;
- Committee on Culture and Education;
- Delegation to the EU-Turkey Joint Parliamentary Committee;
- Delegation to the Euronest Parliamentary Assembly.

== Other work ==
In 2013, he wrote a letter to the British tabloid newspaper The Daily Express, attacking the paper's campaign against Romanian and Bulgarian immigration to the UK. He expressed outrage over the negative image being promoted by the Express.

== Electoral history ==
=== Presidential elections ===
Election	Affiliation	First round			Second round		
Election	Affiliation	Votes	Percentage	Position	Votes	Percentage	Position
2019	Alternative for National Dignity	32,787	0.36%	11th			
