= List of institutions subordinated to the Government of Romania =

This is a list of institutions subordinated to the Government of Romania. The ones that appear in bold are coordinated by the Chancellery of the Prime Minister; the rest are coordinated by the General Secretary of the Government.

== Authorities ==
- **National Authority for Consumer Protection** (Autoritatea Naţională pentru Protecţia Consumatorilor)
- **Authority for State Assets Recovery** (Autoritatea pentru Valorificarea Activelor Statului)
- National Authority for the Protection of the Rights of the Child (Autoritatea Naţională pentru Protecţia Drepturilor Copilului)
- National Authority for Disabled Persons (Autoritatea Naţională pentru Persoanele cu Handicap)
- **National Regulatory Authority for Communications** (Autoritatea Naţională de Reglementare în Comunicaţii)
- National Authority for the Regulation and Monitoring of Public Procurement (Autoritatea Naţională pentru Reglementarea şi Monitorizarea Achizţiilor Publice)
- **National Authority for Youth** (Autoritatea Naţională pentru Tineret)
- National Authority for Sanitary Veterinary Care and Food Safety (Autoritatea Naţională Sanitară Veterinară şi pentru Siguranţa Alimentelor)
- **National Authority for Regulating Public Communal Administration Services** (Autoritatea Naţională de Reglementare pentru Serviciile Publice de Gospodărie Comunală)

== Agencies ==
- Directorate for Investigating Organized Crime and Terrorism (DIICOT)
- **Romanian Agency for Foreign Investments** (Agentia Română pentru Investiţii Străine)
- **National Agency for Sports** (Agenţia Naţională pentru Sport)
- Agency for Government Strategies (Agenţia pentru Strategii Guvernamentale)
- **National Agency for Small and Medium Sized Enterprises and Cooperatives** (Agenţia Naţională pentru Întreprinderi Mici şi Mijlocii şi Cooperaţie)
- **Nuclear Agency** (Agenţia Nucleară)
- **Romanian National Anti-Doping Agency** (Agenţia Naţională Anti-Doping)

== Institutes ==
- National Institute of Statistics (Institutul Naţional de Statistică)
- Institute for the Investigation of Communist Crimes in Romania (Institutul de Investigare a Crimelor Comunismului)

== Inspectorates ==
- General Inspectorate for Communications and Information Technology (Inspectoratul General pentru Comunicaţii şi Tehnologia Informaţiei)
- **State Inspectorate in Constructions** (Inspectoratul de Stat în Construcţii - ISC)

== Offices ==
- **National Office for Prevention and Control of Money Laundering** (Oficiul Naţional de Prevenire şi Combatere a Spălării Banilor)
- State Office for Inventions and Trademarks (Oficiul de Stat pentru Invenţii şi Mărci)
- Romanian Office for Copyright (Oficiul Român pentru Drepturile de Autor)
- Central State Office for Special Problems (Oficiul Central de Stat pentru Probleme Speciale (OCSPS))
- National Registry Office for Classified Information (Oficiul Registrului Naţional al Informaţiilor Secrete de Stat)
- Romanian Office for Adoptions (Oficiului Român pentru Adopţii)

== Commissions ==
- National Forecast Commission (Comisia Naţională de Prognoză)
- **National Commission for Nuclear Activities Control** (Comisia Naţională pentru Controlul Activităţilor Nucleare)

== Television and Radio ==
- Romanian Radio Broadcasting Company(Societatea Română de Radiodifuziune)
- Romanian Television(Societatea Română de Televiziune or SRTv)

== Other institutions ==
- National Administration of the State's Reserves (Administraţia Naţională a Rezervelor de Stat)
- National Customs Authority (Direcţia Generală a Vămilor)
- State Secretary for the Problems of the December 1989 Revolutionaries (Secretariatul de Stat pentru Problemele Revolutionarilor din Decembrie 1989)
