= University of Agricultural Sciences and Veterinary Medicine of Cluj-Napoca =

Agricultural university in Cluj-Napoca, Romania

Coordinates: 46°45′38″N 23°34′14″E

University of Agricultural Sciences and Veterinary Medicine Cluj-Napoca
- Universitatea de Științe Agricole și Medicină Veterinară Cluj-Napoca
- Other name: USAMVCN
- Former names: Institute of Agronomic Studies of Cluj-Mănăștur (1869–1906); Academy of Agriculture of Cluj (1906–1929); Academy of Higher Agronomic Studies of Cluj (1929–1948); Agronomic Institute of Cluj-Napoca (1948–1991)
- Motto: Tradition and Modernity
- Type: Public
- Established: 1869; 157 years ago
- Rector: Cornel Cătoi
- Faculty: 265 [academic year 2012/2013]
- Students: 6,000
- Location: Cluj-Napoca, Cluj County, Romania
- Website: usamvcluj.ro

The University of Agricultural Sciences and Veterinary Medicine of Cluj-Napoca (USAMVCN) (Romanian: Universitatea de Științe Agricole și Medicină Veterinară Cluj-Napoca) is a university in Cluj-Napoca, Romania. With around 6,000 students, the university offers 21 undergraduate programs; all are available in Romanian, 2 in French and 1 in English. Additionally, the university offers 23 Master programs (20 in Romanian, 2 in English and 1 in French).

== Campus ==
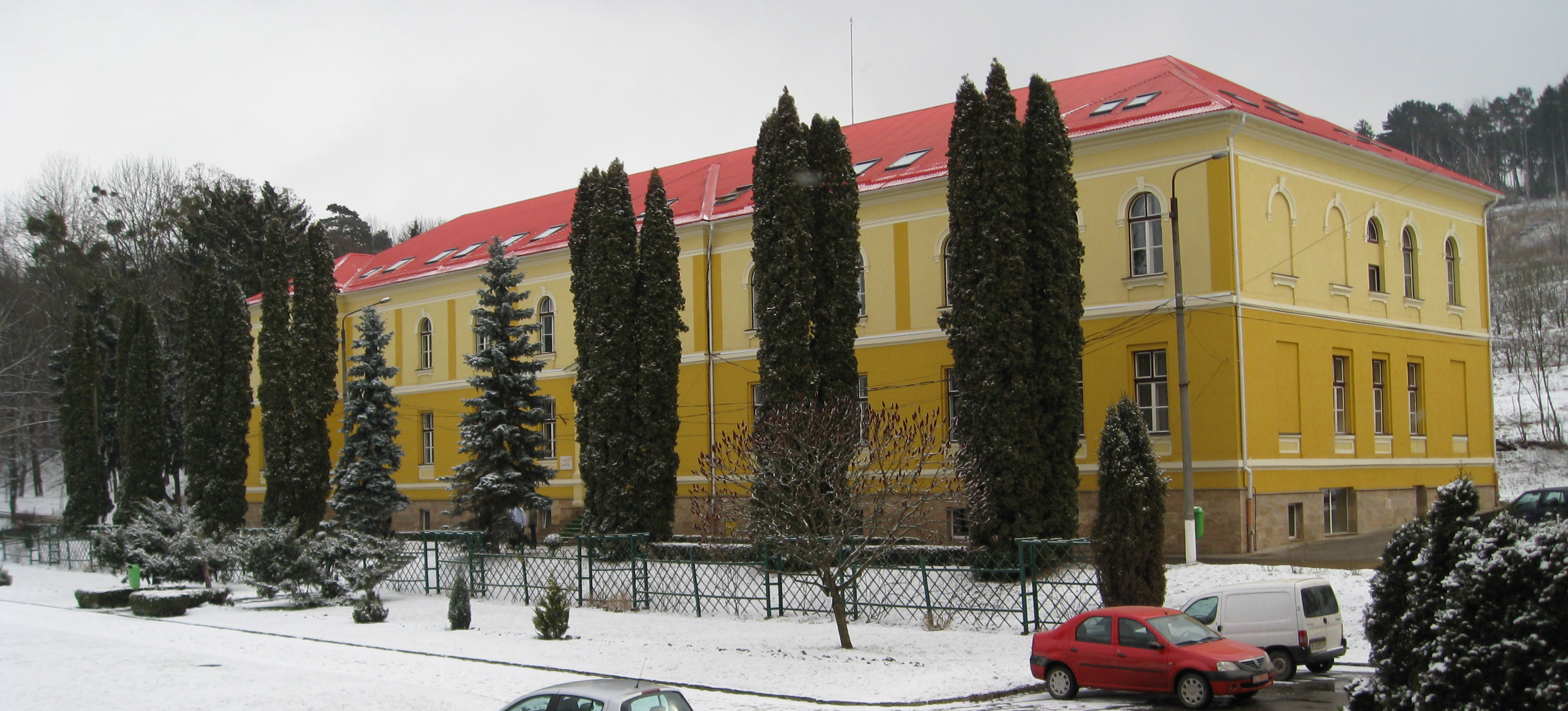
Faculty of Horticulture

The main campus is located in the city of Cluj-Napoca, close to the city centre. Few facilities are located outside the main campus, including several educational farms and field stations. The university has several student housing areas, most notable being Haşdeu with 4 dormitories buildings. The university holds an extension in Viterbo, Italy.

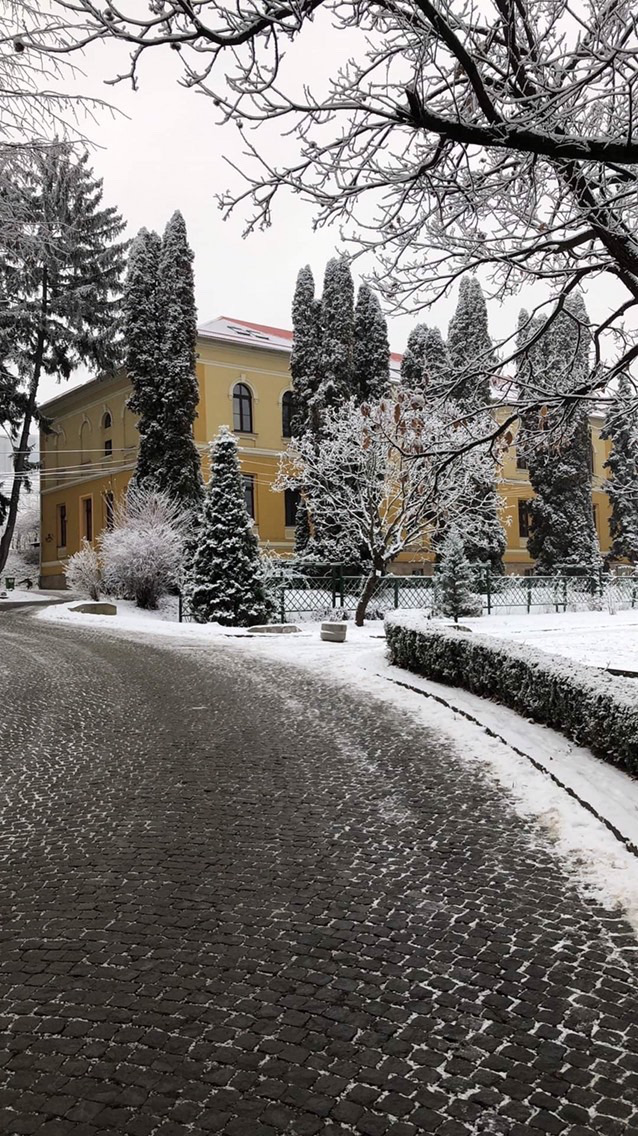
Building of horticulture in the USAMV of Cluj-Napoca

== History ==
The University of Agricultural Sciences and Veterinary Medicine of Cluj-Napoca is the successor of the prestigious Higher School of Agriculture of Cluj, founded in October 1869, under the name of Institute of Agronomic Studies of Cluj-Mănăștur. In 1906, the institute was ranked as an Academy (Academy of Agriculture of Cluj).

For almost 50 years since, the establishment incorporated one single department (Agriculture), with a three-year study program. The Union of Transylvania with Romania in 1918 marked the beginning of a new stage in the evolution of the Agronomic School of Cluj. Since 1921, the agronomic academic education in Romania has been set to four years of study, out of which three of theoretical studies, and a fourth year of intern-ship in state-owned or private farms. Since 1922 the graduates have been receiving the degree of 'agronomic engineer'. In 1929, the Agronomic School of Cluj became the Academy of Higher Agronomic Studies of Cluj.

As a result of the First and Second Vienna Awards, between 1940 and 1945, the Academy of Higher Agronomic Studies Cluj (teaching staff, students and part of its inventory) took refuge in Timișoara, where its activity took place under the name of Faculty of Agronomy Cluj-Timișoara. In 1945, the Faculty of Agronomy returned to Cluj. Since 1948, it functioned as the Agronomic Institute of Cluj, initially with one Faculty, that of Agriculture. The Faculty of Animal Sciences was created in 1959 and the Faculty of Veterinary Medicine was founded in 1962. In 1977, the Department of Horticulture was founded. It merged with the Department of Agriculture and they formed the Faculty of Agriculture and Horticulture. In 1990, the university was reorganized into four faculties (Agriculture, Horticulture, Animal Science and Veterinary Medicine). The current name of the university dates from 1991. Since 2012, the Faculty of Food Science and Technology became the fifth of the university.

The University of Agricultural Sciences and Veterinary Medicine of Cluj-Napoca has adopted the Bologna Process and European Credit Transfer and Accumulation System (ECTS). The university currently offers programs in Romanian, English and French in all the three cycle: cycle 1 (bachelor's degree), cycle 2 (master's degree) and cycle 3 (doctorate).

== Ranking ==
Nationally, the University of Agricultural Sciences and Veterinary Medicine of Cluj-Napoca was ranked the 5th, among the universities of education and advanced research.

== Academic programs ==
The university has 5 faculties. It offers bachelor's, master's, and Ph.D. degrees, along with advanced postgraduate studies.

Here is the list of the faculties, along with the languages in which their courses are taught:

(RO-Romanian, EN-English, FR-French)

Cycle 1 (Bachelor's Degree)

- Faculty of Agriculture

Agriculture RO FR (4 years)
Mountain Agriculture RO (4 years)
Environmental Protection and Engineering in Agriculture RO (4 years)
Machineries and Installations for Agriculture and Food Industry RO (4 years)
Biology RO (3 years)

- Faculty of Horticulture

Horticulture RO (4 years)
Landscape Design RO (4 years)
Silviculture RO (4 years)
Economic Engineering in Agriculture RO (4 years)
Management and Engineering in Public food Service and Agritourism RO (4 years)
Management and Engineering in Tourism RO (4 years)
Land Measurements and Cadastre RO (4 years)

- Faculty of Animal Science and Biotechnology

Animal Science RO (4 years)
Biotechnologies in Agriculture RO (4 years)
Biotechnologies in Food Industry RO (4 years)
Biotehnologies in Veterinary Sciences RO (4 years)
Fisheries and Aquaculture RO (4 years)

- Faculty of Veterinary Medicine

Veterinary Medicine RO, EN, FR (6 years) - includes cycles 1 and 2

- Faculty of Food Science and Technology

Food Technology RO (4 years)
Food Inspection RO (4 years)
Food Engineering RO (4 years)

Cycle 2 (Master's Degree)

- Faculty of Agriculture

Organic Agriculture RO (2 years)
Management of Natural and Agritourism Resources in Mountain Regions RO (2 years)
Rural development RO (2 years)
Plant Protection RO (2 years)
Biology of Agroecosystems RO (2 years)
Protection of Natural and Anthropic Systems RO (2 years)
Agriculture, Climatic Changes and Food Safety FR (2 years)

- Faculty of Horticulture

Management of Horticultural Production in Controlled Climate RO (2 years)
Horticulture Sciences RO (2 years)
Design and Maintenance of Green Spaces RO (2 years)
Agribusiness RO (2 years)
Agroalimentary Economy RO (2 years)
Biodiversity and Conservation RO (2 years)
Genetic Engineering in Plant Amelioration RO (2 years)
Technology and use of Special Vines and Derived Products RO (2 years)
Forest Management RO (2 years)
Agribusiness EN (2 years)

- Faculty of Animal Science and Biotechnology

Management of animal breeding and aquaculture RO (2 years)
Management of the Quality of Animal Origin Products RO (2 years)
Applied Biotechnologies RO (2 years)

- Faculty of Food Science and Technology

Food Processing and Quality Control Systems RO (2 years)
Food Safety and Consumer Protection RO (2 years)
Food Quality Management EN (2 years)

Cycle 3 (Doctorate - PhD)

- Domain Agronomy
- Domain Horticulture
- Domain Biotechnology
- Domain Animal Science
- Domain Veterinary Medicine

== Student life ==
- Several student associations
- Club culture (music, dance, photography, ikebana, etc.)

== International memberships ==
The University of Agricultural Sciences and Veterinary Medicine of Cluj-Napoca is member in the following international associations:

- EUA (European University Association)
- ICA (Association for European Life Science Universities)
- CASEE (Central and South Eastern Europe Network of ICA)
- EARMA (European Association of Research Managers and Administrators)
- BSUN (Black Sea Universities Network)
- AUF (Agence Universitaire de la Francophonie)
