= Viorel Cataramă =

Romanian businessman and politician (born 1955)

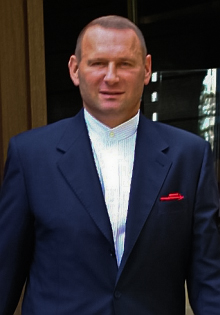
- Viorel Cataramă in October 2010

Member of the Senate of Romania
- In office 22 November 1996 – 10 December 2000
- Constituency: Bacău County

State Secretary at the Ministry of Commerce and Tourism
- In office 28 Junie 1990 – 30 April 1991
- Prime Minister: Petre Roman
- Minister: Constantin Fota

Personal details
- Born: 31 January 1955 (age 71) Bacău, Bacău Region, Romanian People's Republic
- Party: National Liberal Party (1993–1999, 2002–2018, 2024–present)
- Other political affiliations: National Liberal Party - Youth Wing (1990–1992); New Liberal Party (1992–1993); Alliance for Romania (1999–2002); Liberal Right Party (2019–2024)
- Education: Bucharest Academy of Economic Studies
- Profession: Economist

Viorel Cataramă (born January 31, 1955) is a Romanian businessman and politician who founded the furniture manufacturer Elvila in 1990. In 2019, he founded the Liberal Right Party (DL) and ran on its behalf for the 2019 Romanian presidential election, where he received a very modest result and did not qualify for the second round.

== Early life ==
He was born in Bacău, where he attended primary school and studied at the Lucrețiu Pătrășcanu High School (currently the Gheorghe Vrânceanu National College). He graduated from the Faculty of Commerce of the Bucharest Academy of Economic Studies in 1980. In 2004 he became a doctor in economics, a title awarded by the Bucharest Academy of Economic Studies.

== Personal life ==
He spent the first years after graduating as an economist at the Radio and TV Cassette Company in Bucharest. Since 1984 he has been an economist at Tehnoforestexport, and in 1987 he was appointed Director of the Eastern Europe branch of the company BELCO. Since 1990, he has been the president and CEO of Elvila.

== Political activity ==
Since 1990, he has been a member of the National Liberal Party – Aripa Tânără, and in 1990 he was appointed Secretary of State at the Ministry of Trade and Tourism, in the Petre Roman government. In 1992, he was in charge of the New Liberal Party (NPL), and in 1993, after its merger with the PNL, he became Vice President of the National Liberal Party (PNL), a position he held until 1999.

During the 1996–2000 legislature, as senator on behalf of the PNL from Bacău, he was elected president of the Economic Commission of the Senate, the period in which numerous legislative initiatives were promoted, some of them eventually becoming laws.

== Electoral history ==
=== Presidential elections ===
Election	Affiliation	First round			Second round		
Election	Affiliation	Votes	Percentage	Position	Votes	Percentage	Position
2019	Liberal Right Party	48,622	0.53%	9th	not qualified		

== Philanthropy ==
In 1995 he instituted the "Viorel Cataramă" prizes, which are awarded every year to the students of the Gheorghe Vrănceanu National College in Bacău, as a financial reward for the efforts of those who have won prizes at national school olympiads.

In 1998 he was elected honorary citizen of Beiuș.

On October 3, 2000 he organized the concert given by tenor José Carreras at the Romanian Athenaeum, on the occasion of the tenth anniversary of the establishment of the Elvila group of companies, a concert accompanied by the Bucharest Philharmonic Orchestra, under the baton of the young Spanish conductor David Gimenez. Since 2007, it organizes, in collaboration with the Bucharest National Opera, an annual extraordinary Christmas concert with world-renowned soloists and/or conductors, selected by mutual agreement between the two parties.
