= Voicești =

- Commune
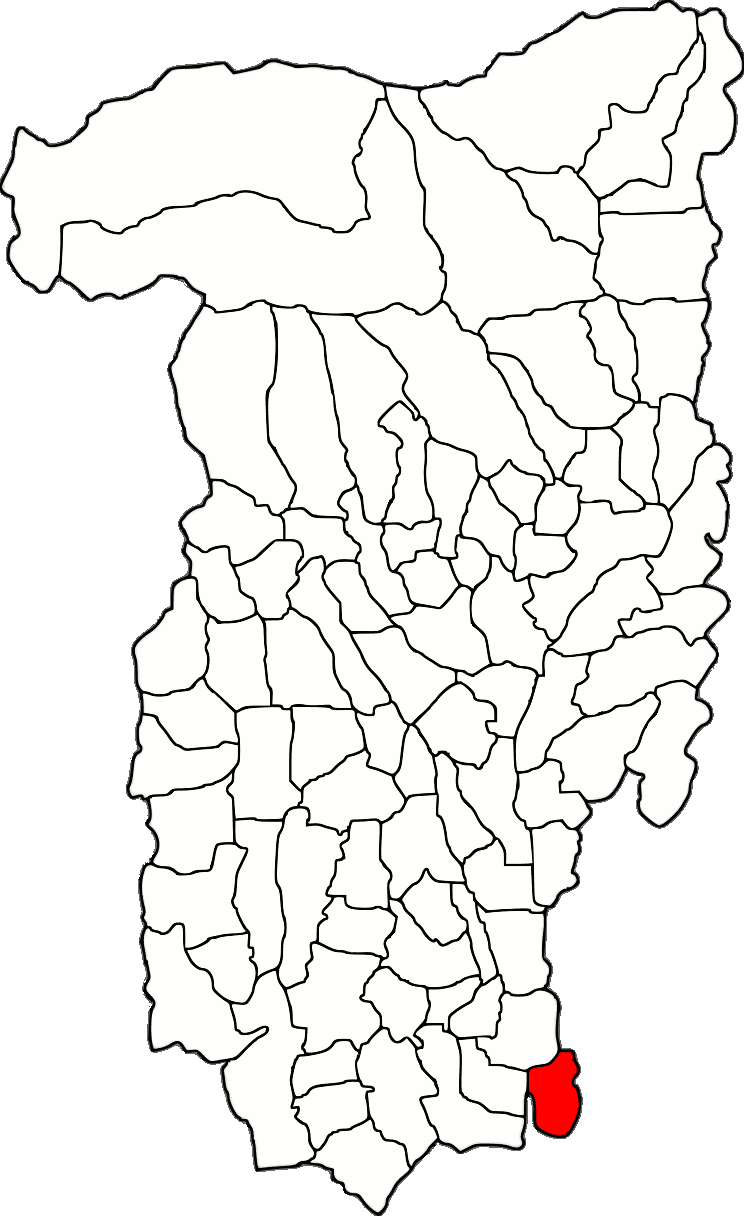
- Location in Vâlcea County

- Location in Romania
- Coordinates: 44°36′N 24°17′E
- Country: Romania
- County: Vâlcea
- Area: 13.33 km^{2} (5.15 sq mi)
- Population (2021-12-01): 1,416
  - Density: 106.2/km^{2} (275.1/sq mi)
- Time zone: UTC+02:00 (EET)
  - Summer (DST): UTC+03:00 (EEST)
- Vehicle reg.: VL

Voicești is a commune located in Vâlcea County, Oltenia, Romania. It is composed of three villages: Tighina, Voicești and Voiceștii din Vale.
