= Mircea Coșea =

Romanian politician (1942–2025)

Dumitru Gheorghe Mircea Coșea (9 June 1942 – 18 December 2025) was a Romanian politician, economist, diplomat, essayist, journalist and academic. A former member of the Party of Social Democracy (PDSR) until June 1997, he joined Teodor Meleșcanu and Iosif Boda in creating the short-lived Alliance for Romania (Alianța pentru România, ApR) party, which merged into the National Liberal Party (PNL) in 2002. In 1999, Coșea was among the members of Varujan Vosganian's grouping, the Union of Right-wing Forces (Uniunea Forțelor de Dreapta, UFD), which also joined the PNL.

Coșea was a member of the Chamber of Deputies for Constanța County in 1996–2000 (with the PDSR group in 1996–1997, as an independent in 1997–2000) and for Olt County, with the Justice and Truth alliance group, from 2004. With the accession of Romania to the European Union on 1 January 2007, became a Member of the European Parliament with the Alliance of Liberals and Democrats for Europe. In March 2007, he resigned from the PNL and, as an independent MEP, joined the Identity, Tradition, Sovereignty (ITS) group inside the European Parliament.

He was a professor at the Faculty of General Economics, part of the Academy of Economic Studies (ASE), and at the Dimitrie Cantemir Christian University (UCDC), being head of the UCDC's Department of European Integration. He was also a regular contributor to Săptămâna Financiară.

== Life and career ==
Born in Ploiești, Coșea graduated from the ASE in 1965, and furthered his studies at the Istituto di Studi per lo Sviluppo Economico in Italy, and later took his Ph.D. Between 1967 and the Romanian Revolution of 1989, he was a simple member of the Romanian Communist Party. After winning a competition for the office, he represented Communist Romania at the United Nations Economic Commission for Europe in Geneva between 1973 and 1980. According to his own testimony, he was involved in obtaining relief funds for the town of Zimnicea, largely destroyed by the severe 1977 earthquake.

In 1994, he authored a textbooks on Economics for high school students.

As a deputy, Coșea sat on the Committees for Economic Policy, Reform and Privatization (1996–2000) for Budget, Finance and Banks, and for Labor and Social Protection (both in 2004–2005); in 2005, he was appointed to the Committee for European Integration. Between 1993 and 1997, he was a Minister of State in the Nicolae Văcăroiu PDSR cabinet, and a member of the Council for Economic Coordination, Strategy and Reform. He was later Secretary of State in the Finance Ministry.

At the time, Coșea was among the initiators of mass privatization strategies, and organized the latter as a release of coupons to citizens, to be transformed into stocks (see History of Romania since 1989). Although the measure was initially received with interest, the program was ultimately unsuccessful and most businesses up for privatization did not attract investors' attention (by late 2006, a third of them had gone bankrupt or were about to do so). Coșea attributed this negative phenomenon to the underdevelopment of the local capital market, as well as to strategy errors of both the PDSR majority (who had refused to give backing by privatizing Bancorex and Banca Agricolă) and the new Democratic Convention cabinet of Victor Ciorbea (who changed the privatization law to accommodate an initial public offering, viewed by Coșea as more susceptible to political corruption). He also indicated that only 60% of the companies listed for privatization had any real chance of success.

In 1996–2000, Coșea represented the Parliament of Romania to the Central European Initiative. He sat on the Board of the National Commission for Economic Prognosis, Planning and Conjuncture.

Following an investigation by the CNSAS into Securitate archives (August–October 2005), it was confirmed that Coșea had served as a secret police officer in service of the Communist authorities; the CNSAS was not, however, able to indicate whether he had actually been responsible for political repression. He rejected the verdict entirely, stressing that it contradicted the fact that he had worked abroad during much of the period. According to his version, the Securitate's Espionage Department (Direcția de Informații Externe, DIE) had repeatedly tried to recruit him during his stay in Switzerland. Additionally, he indicated that, in 1980, the DIE had kidnapped him and kept him secluded for almost a month, with the intention of obtaining his collaboration, that his daughter was threatened with physical harm, and that, eventually, he was released in exchange for pledging to renounce his office in Geneva (and giving the impression that this was his own decision). Coșea also stated that he was forced to wear an orthopedic cast over his leg, to give the impression that his disappearance was due to an automobile accident.

In November 2006, it was rumored that Mircea Coșea weighed the possibility of leaving the PNL and siding with the dissident faction around Gheorghe Flutur and Theodor Stolojan (the Liberal Democratic Party). On 25 January 2007, the CNSAS took a second vote on the matter of his past activities, and established that he had been responsible for political policing, causing Coșea to file a complaint.

He ultimately resigned from the PNL on 14 March 2007, indicating that he had felt marginalized inside its group of MEPs. Despite this move, Coșea denied that he had plans to join the other Romanian Identity, Tradition, Sovereignty members inside the Greater Romania Party. He also dismissed the notion that the ITS represented a far right ideology, and argued that his presence would be a sign of actual moderation. This came at a time when the PNL was reviewing an internal directive to exclude former Securitate collaborators.

Coșea was married, and fathered a daughter (born 1970). He died on 18 December 2025, at the age of 83.

== Selected works ==
- Economie - manual pentru învățământul liceal ("Economics - Textbook for High School Teaching"), Editura Didactică și Pedagogică, 1994
- Jurnal în tranziție ("Diary of the Transition"), Editura Expert, Bucharest, 1995
- with Silviu Cerna, Lucian Croitoru, Ion Davidovici, and Daniel Dăianu: Oeconomica, Editura Rosetti, Bucharest, 2005
