= 2009 electoral calendar =

National and federal elections held in 2009

This electoral calendar 2009 lists the national/federal direct elections held in 2009 in the de jure and de facto sovereign states and their dependent territories. Referendums are included, although they are not elections. By-elections are not included.

== January ==
- 12 January: Malta, President (by the parliament)
- 18 January: El Salvador, Parliament
- 25 January: Bolivia, Constitutional referendum
- 30 January: Somalia, President (by the parliament)
- 31 January: Iraq, Governorate Councils

== February ==
- 8 February: Turkmenistan, Parliament (3rd Round)
- 8 February: Liechtenstein, Parliament
- 8 February: Switzerland, Referendum on freedom of movement within the European Union
- 10 February: Israel, Parliament
- 12 February: French Polynesia, President (by the parliament)
- 15 February: Venezuela, Constitutional referendum

== March ==
- 3 March: Federated States of Micronesia, Parliament
- 8 March: North Korea, Parliament
- 12 March: Antigua and Barbuda, Parliament
- 15 March: El Salvador, President
- 18 March: Azerbaijan, Constitutional referendum
- 21 March: Slovakia, President (1st Round)
- 22 March: Macedonia, President (1st Round)
- 29 March: Montenegro, Parliament
- 29 March: Mayotte, Status referendum

== April ==
- 4 April: Slovakia, President (2nd Round)
- 5 April: Macedonia, President (2nd Round)
- 5 April: Moldova, Parliament
- 9 April: Algeria, President
- 9 April: Indonesia, Parliament
- 16 April: India, Parliament (1st Round)
- 19 April: Haiti, Senate (1st Round) (12 of 30 seats)
- 19 April: Northern Cyprus, Parliament
- 22 April: South Africa, Parliament
- 23 April: India, Parliament (2nd Round)
- 25 April: Iceland, Parliament
- 26 April: Andorra, Parliament
- 26 April: Ecuador, President and Parliament
- 30 April: India, Parliament (3rd Round)

== May ==
- 3 May: Panama, President and Parliament
- 6 May: South Africa, President (by the parliament)
- 7 May: India, Parliament (4th Round)
- 9 May: Maldives, Parliament
- 10 May: New Caledonia, Parliament
- 13 May: India, Parliament (5th Round)
- 16 May: Kuwait, Parliament
- 17 May: Lithuania, President
- 17 May: Switzerland, Referendum
- 17 May: Comoros, Constitutional referendum
- 19 May: Malawi, President and Parliament
- 20 May: Cayman Islands, Parliament and constitutional referendum
- 20 May: Moldova, President (1st Round) (indirect)
- 23 May: Germany, President (indirect)
- 24 May: Mongolia, President
- 31 May: South Ossetia, Parliament

== June ==
- 2 June: Greenland, Parliament
- 3 June: Moldova, President (2nd Round) (indirect)
- 4–7 June: European Union, European Parliament
- 7 June: Denmark, Act of Succession referendum
- 7 June: Luxembourg, Parliament
- 7 June: Lebanon, Parliament
- 12 June: Iran, President
- 21 June: Haiti, Senate (2nd Round) (12 of 30 seats)
- 21–22 June: Italy, Electoral law referendum
- 28 June: Albania, Parliament
- 28 June: Argentina, Legislative
- 28 June: Guinea-Bissau, President (1st Round)

== July ==
- 5 July: Bulgaria, Parliament
- 5 July: Mexico, Legislative
- 8 July: Indonesia, President
- 12 July: Republic of the Congo, President
- 18 July: Mauritania, President
- 23 July: Kyrgyzstan, President
- 25 July: Kurdistan Region, Parliament and President
- 26 July: Guinea-Bissau, President (2nd Round)
- 29 July: Moldova, Parliament
- 31 July – 21 August: New Zealand, Referendum

== August ==
- 4 August: Niger, Constitutional referendum
- 20 August: Afghanistan, President
- 30 August: Gabon, President
- 30 August: Japan, Parliament

== September ==
- 1–2 September: Vanuatu, President (indirect)
- 8 September: Montserrat, Parliament
- 12 September: Turkey, Constitution Referendum
- 14 September: Norway, Parliament
- 16 September: Switzerland, Federal Council (indirect)
- 20 September: Macau, Legislative
- 25 September: Aruba, Parliament
- 27 September: Germany, Parliament
- 27 September: Portugal, Parliament
- 27 September: Switzerland, Referendum

== October ==
- 2 October: Republic of Ireland, Treaty of Lisbon referendum
- 4 October: Greece, Parliament
- 16 October: Botswana, Parliament
- 20 October: Niger, Parliament
- 25 October: Tunisia, President and Parliament
- 25 October: Uruguay, President (1st Round), Parliament and Referendum
- 26 October: Marshall Islands, President (indirect)
- 28 October: Mozambique, President and Parliament

== November ==
- 5 November: Falkland Islands, Legislative Assembly
- 7 November: Northern Mariana Islands, Governor (1st Round) and Legislative
- 10 November: Moldova, President (1st Round) (indirect)
- 22 November: Romania, President (1st Round) and Referendum
- 23 November: Northern Mariana Islands, Governor (2nd Round)
- 25 November: Saint Vincent and the Grenadines, Constitutional referendum
- 27–28 November: Namibia, President and Parliament
- 29 November: Equatorial Guinea, President
- 29 November: Honduras, President and Parliament
- 29 November: Switzerland, Referendum
- 29 November: Uruguay, President (2nd Round)

== December ==
- 6 December: Bolivia, President and Parliament
- 6 December: Comoros, Parliament (1st Round)
- 6 December: Romania, President (2nd Round)
- 7 December: Moldova, President (2nd Round) (indirect)
- 12 December: Abkhazia, President
- 13 December: Chile, President (1st Round) and Parliament
- 18 December: Dominica, Parliament
- 20 December: Comoros, Parliament (2nd round)
- 27 December: Uzbekistan, Parliament
- 27 December: Croatia, President (1st Round)
