= Peluza Roș-Albastră =

Group of football supporters from Romania

- Abbreviation: PRA
- Founded: 2016
- Type: Supporters' group
- Team: FCSB
- Motto: FCSB e Steaua!
- Location: Bucharest, Romania
- Arena: Arena Națională
- Stand: South (Peluza II)
- Colors: red, blue

Peluza Roş-Albastră was a group of Romanian football supporters that was dissolved in 2020.

== Formation ==
The legendary ultras groups of Peluza Nord and Peluza Sud chose to remain neutral and support CSA Steaua Bucharest in the Fourth Romanian League after the dispute between the owner of Football Club FCSB (former FC Steaua Bucharest) and the major multi-sports club run by the Ministry of National Defence. This action led to a new ultras group waiting to fill the void. During the infamous FC Steaua Bucuresti - Manchester City 2016 match, Dinamo Bucharest ultras successfully tricked home fans of Fc Steaua Bucuresti into wearing their colors and a message saying ''Doar Dinamo Bucuresti'' (Only Dinamo Bucharest). Former members of Peluza Nord and other fans wanted to take revenge and founded a new ultras group.

== Peluza Roş-Albastră's stance over the identity dispute ==
Unlike most Peluza Nord and Peluza Sud members who are either neutral or take the side of CSA Steaua Bucharest, Peluza Ros-Albastra supports FCSB in this dispute, claiming it is the historical team that was founded on 7 June 1947 and has all the history and trophies. Because of this divergence in opinion, the ultras and fans alike are on two opposite sides. One side claims that CSA Steaua Bucharest is the true successor of the legendary team and the other claim it is FCSB. Even with this ongoing dispute over identity, FCSB still enjoys huge popularity, remaining among the biggest football clubs in the country.

== Controversies ==
Peluza Roş-Albastră had its fair share of controversies from being accused of getting paid by owner Gigi Becali, tricking their supporters into paying an extra fee for tickets to fund a choreography that was never shown and disputes between smaller ultras groups over the control of the stand.

During a November 2018 derby between FCSB and Dinamo Bucharest, Peluza Roş-Albastră asked fans to pay an extra 5 lei for a supposed choreography ahead of the big derby. During the game, the ultras only showed a few banners. Many fans felt robbed and wondered where the money went.

Ultras group ''Old Fans'' was one of the few organized groups within Peluza Roş-Albastră alongside ''Renegades''. Because of a dispute over the leadership of the stand, the Old Fans group chose to leave the stand and participate in home games by staying in the tribune or Peluza I of the stadium instead of Peluza II. During a 2017 clash between FCSB and FC Viktoria Plzen, the two groups stood on opposite sides of the stadium. This didn't last long since Old Fans didn't enjoy huge popularity and slowly faded.

After owner Gigi Becali praised rival fans of Dinamo Bucharest and made public statements about missing the old Ultras groups of Peluza Nord and Peluza Sud, Peluza Roş-Albastră chose to organize a protest against the owner and club by not attending either home or away games. The conflict was settled once the owner apologized for his comments.

== Fanbase and groups ==
Peluza Roş-Albastră consists of a handful of organized groups, ''Oltenița mereu prezenți'' and ''Tinerii țin viu fenomenul''. Various groups such as ''Smokers'', ''Old Fans'', ''Renegades'' and ''Elite 47'' either dissolved or stopped attending matches. Most fans buying tickets at Peluza Roş-Albastră's stand are casual fans. Because of the confusion during this dispute of identity, some ultras from various old-school brigades chose to attend FCSB games and show support. During away games, the team enjoys huge support from fans across the country, usually filling the stadium since the majority consider this team to be the real Steaua Bucharest.

== Dissolution in 2020 ==
After Gheorghe Mustata, one of the leaders from Peluza Nord was released from jail in 2020, he returned to FCSB and declared that ''Peluza Nord is back''. Peluza Ros Albastra was dissolved and a new group arose by the name of "Tornado 47."
