= Pârvulescu =

Pârvulescu or Pîrvulescu, a Romanian-language surname, may refer to:

- Cătălin Pârvulescu, footballer
- Constantin Pîrvulescu, communist politician and dissident
- Cristian Pârvulescu, political analyst
- Dumitru Pîrvulescu, Greco-Roman wrestler
- Ioana Pârvulescu, writer
- Nicolae Pârvulescu, mayor of Bucharest
- Paul Pîrvulescu, footballer

== See also ==
- Pârvulești (disambiguation)
- Pârvu
