= Moldovan presidential election, 2009 =

Moldovan presidential election, 2009 can refer to two elections:

- The May–June 2009 Moldovan presidential election held after the April 2009 Moldovan parliamentary election
- The November–December 2009 Moldovan presidential election held after the July 2009 Moldovan parliamentary election
