= Mititelu =

Mititelu is a Romanian surname. Notable people with the surname include:

- Christian Mititelu (born 1944), Romanian journalist
- Gheorghe Mititelu (born 1934), Romanian chess player
