= Pietroiu =

Pietroiu may refer to several places in Romania:

- Pietroiu, a village in Vădeni Commune, Brăila County
- Pietroiu, a village in Borcea Commune, Călăraşi County
