= 2009 Romanian presidential election =

- 22 November 2009 (first round); 6 December 2009 (second round)
- Turnout: 54.37% (first round) ▼4.12pp 58.02% (second round) ▲2.81pp
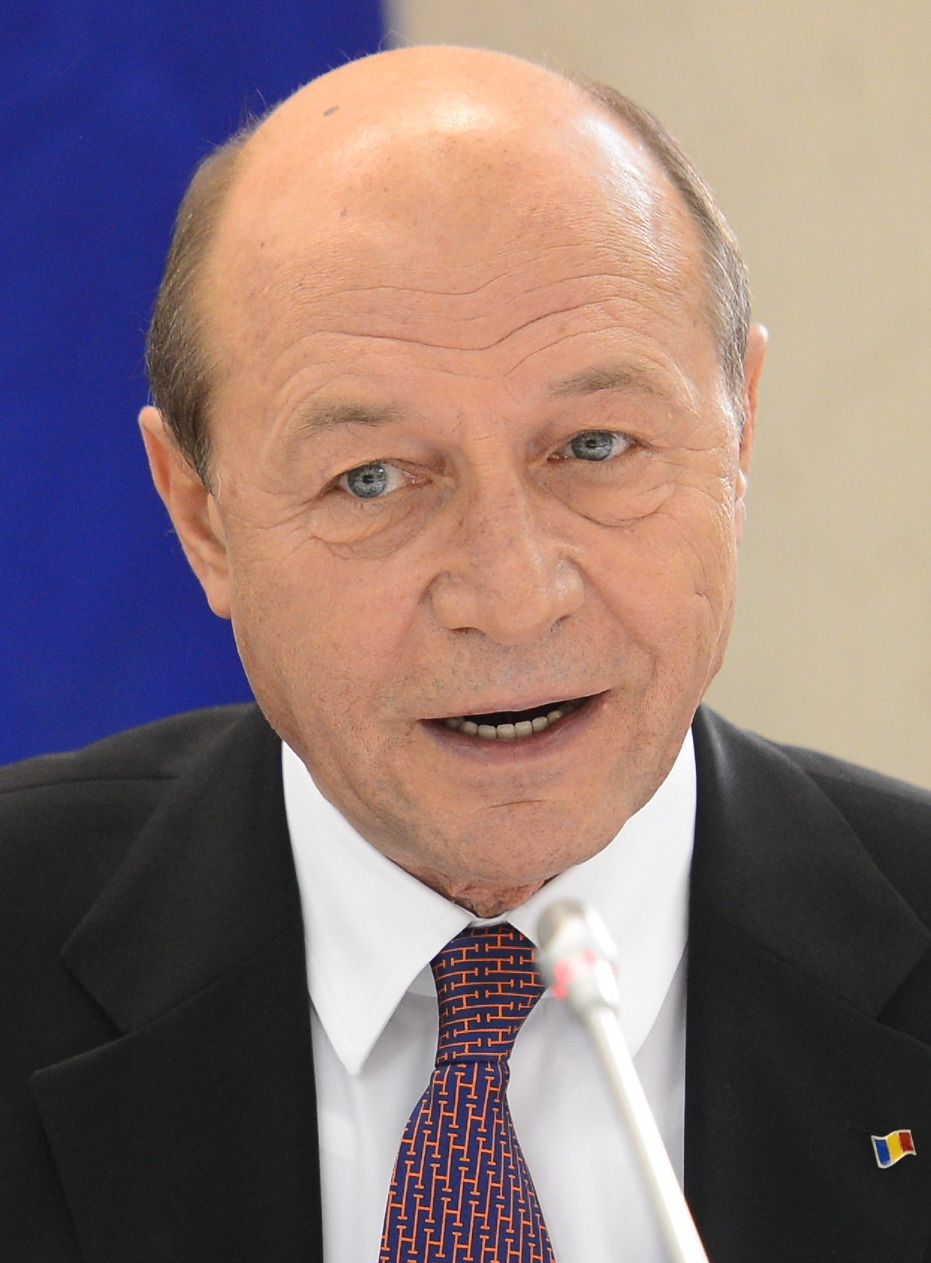

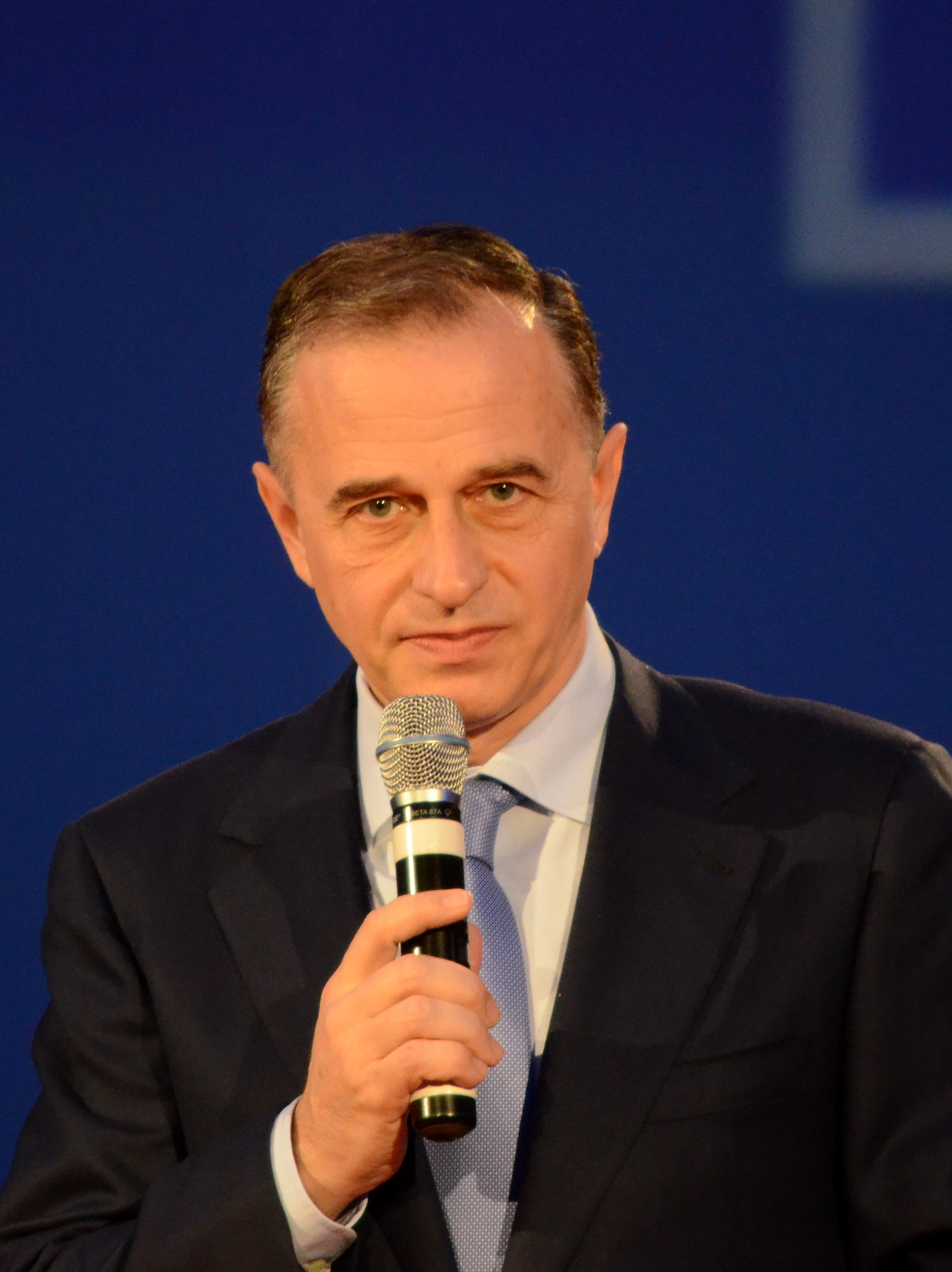
Nominee	Traian Băsescu	Mircea Geoană
Party	Independent (Note: The President of Romania traditionally resigns from party membership after taking office. Although Băsescu was officially an independent, his campaign was endorsed and funded by Democratic Liberal Party.)	PSD
Popular vote	5,275,808	5,205,760
Percentage	50.33%	49.67%
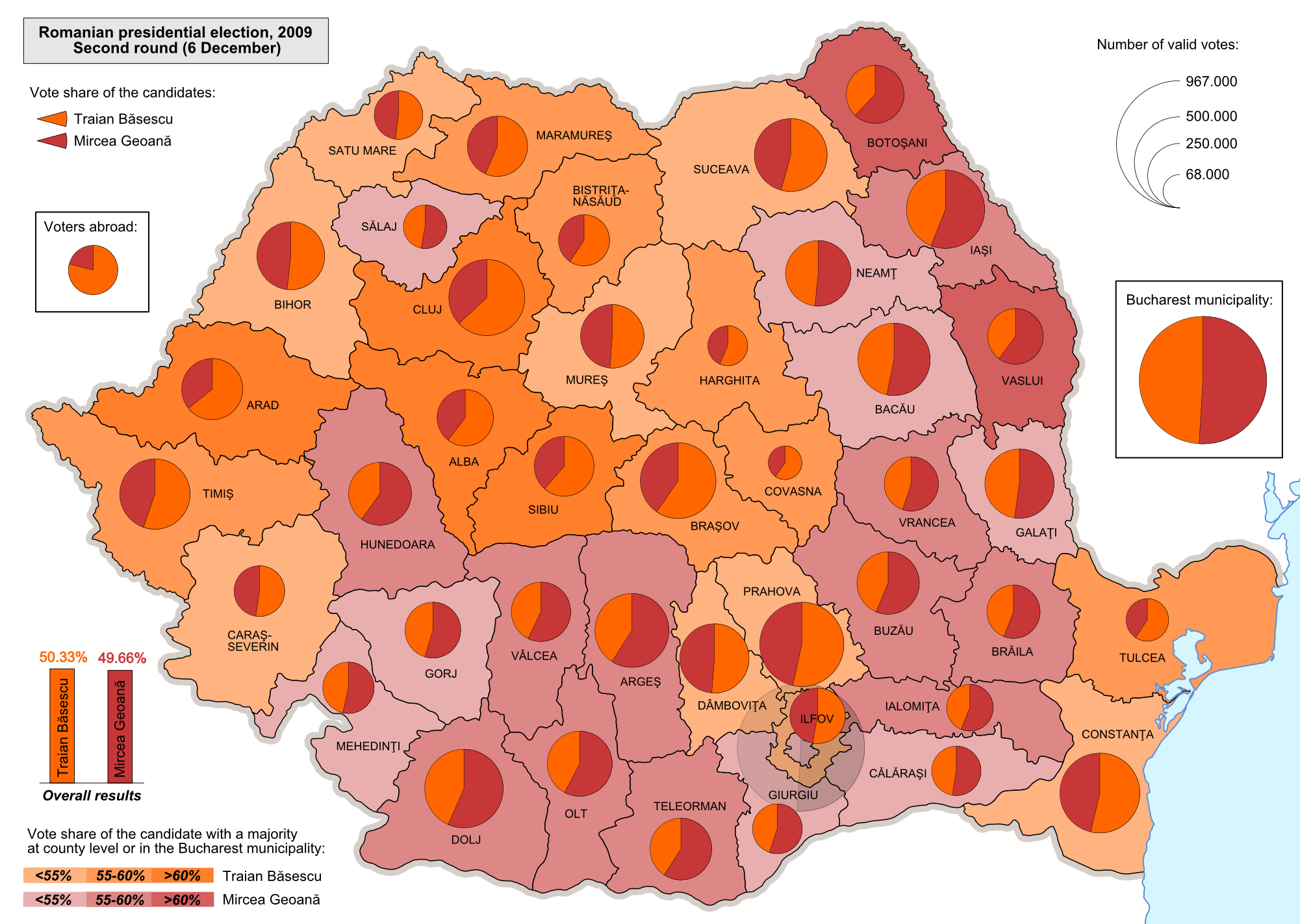
- Second round vote strength by county
President before election
Traian Băsescu
Independent
Elected President
Traian Băsescu
Independent

Presidential elections were held in Romania in 2009. They were the sixth presidential elections held in post-1989 Romania. The first round took place on 22 November, with a run-off round between the top two candidates Traian Băsescu (supported by the Democratic Liberal Party or PDL for short) and Mircea Geoană (supported by the Social Democratic Party or PSD for short) on 6 December 2009. Although most exit polls suggested a victory for Geoană in the runoff, the authorities declared Băsescu the narrow winner with 50.33% of the votes. To date, it is the closest presidential election in the political history of Romania.

The opposition contested the results, citing a "high number of void ballots, modified voting protocols, and massive electoral tourism", vowing to challenge the result in the constitutional court. The Organization for Security and Co-operation in Europe (OSCE) declared that the election "was held generally in line with OSCE commitments", but also urged the authorities to investigate claims of fraud. On 8 December, the Social Democratic Party (PSD) submitted a request to annul and repeat the run-off to the Constitutional Court, claiming it had been rigged. On 14 December, the Constitutional Court rejected the request after recounting all the annulled votes.

A referendum was held alongside the first round of voting on introducing a unicameral parliament of up to 300 deputies (replacing the existing bicameral parliament) and reducing the number of MPs to 300 but retaining the bicameral structure.

== Candidates ==
There were twelve candidates of which three ran as independents. The candidates of the major parties were: the then incumbent Traian Băsescu (independent, but supported by Democratic Liberal Party (PDL) and the official fraction of Christian Democratic National Peasants' Party (PNȚCD), led by Marian Miluț), Mircea Geoană (Social Democratic Party or PSD for short), Crin Antonescu (National Liberal Party (PNL) and the contender faction of PNȚCD, led by Radu Sîrbu), Hunor Kelemen (Democratic Alliance of Hungarians in Romania or UDMR/RMDSZ for short) and Corneliu Vadim Tudor (Greater Romania Party or PRM for short). Mayor of Bucharest Sorin Oprescu (formerly PSD member) announced his candidacy as an independent candidate on 5 October 2009; Băsescu had also been mayor of Bucharest before becoming president during the early 2000s.

Prince Radu of Romania, husband of Margareta of Romania first announced his candidacy to the office of President on 9 April 2009, but later withdrew.

Name	Lifespan	Public Administration Experience	Affiliation and endorsements	Alma mater and profession	Candidacy Announcement dates
Traian Băsescu	Born: 4 November 1951 (age 58); Basarabi, Constanța County	President of Romania (2004–election day); Mayor of Bucharest (2000–2004); Deputy (1992–2000); Minister of Transport (1991–1992, 1996–1998, 1998–2000); Sub-Secretary of State for Naval Transportation with the Ministry of Transport (1990–1991); Director of Civil Navigation Inspectorate with the Ministry of Transport (1989–1990); Former presidential election: 2004: 33.9% (2nd place, 1st round), 51.2% (winner, 2nd round)	Affiliation: PDL	Mircea cel Bătrân Naval Academy (1976) seaman	
Mircea Geoană	Born: 14 July 1958 (age 51); Bucharest	President of the Senate of Romania (2008–election day); Senator (2004–election day); Minister of Foreign Affairs (2000–2004); Romanian Ambassador to US (1996–2000)	Affiliation: Alliance PSD+PC	Faculty of Mechanics, Politehnica University of Bucharest (1983); Faculty of Law, University of Bucharest (1993) diplomat	
Crin Antonescu	Born: 21 September 1959 (age 50); Tulcea, Tulcea County	Senator (2008–election day); Minister of Youth and Sport (1997–2000); Deputy (1992–2008)	Affiliation: PNL	Faculty of History and Philosophy, University of Bucharest (1985) history teacher, museum curator	
Corneliu Vadim Tudor	Born: 28 November 1949 (age 59); Bucharest; Died: 14 September 2015, Bucharest	MEP (2009–election day); Senator (1992–2008) Former presidential elections: 2004: 12.6% (3rd place, 1st round); 2000: 28.3% (2nd place, 1st round), 33.2% (2nd place, 2nd round); 1996: 4.7% (5th place, 1st round)	Affiliation: PRM	Faculty of Philosophy, University of Bucharest (1971) journalist, writer	
Kelemen Hunor	18 October 1967 (age 42); Cârța, Harghita County	Deputy (2000–election day); Secretary of State with the Minister of Culture (1997–2000)	Affiliation: UDMR	University of Agricultural Sciences and Veterinary Medicine of Cluj-Napoca (1993), Faculty of Philosophy, Babeș-Bolyai University, Cluj-Napoca (1998) veterinarian, philosophy teacher	
Sorin Oprescu	Born: 7 November 1951 (age 58); Bucharest	Mayor of Bucharest (2008–election day); Senator (2000–2008)	Affiliation: none	Carol Davila University of Medicine and Pharmacy (1976) surgeon	
Gigi Becali	Born: 25 June 1958 (age 51); Vădeni, Brăila County	MEP (2009–election day) Former presidential election: 2004: 1.8% (6th place, 1st round)	Affiliation: PNG-CD	"Iuliu Maniu" high school, Bucharest (1978) shepherd, football club owner	
Remus Cernea	Born: 25 June 1974 (age 35); Bucharest		Affiliation: Green Party	Faculty of Philosophy, University of Bucharest (2002) civic activist	
Constantin Rotaru	Born: 23 July 1955 (age 54); Dănicei, Vâlcea County	Deputy (1992–1996)	Affiliation: Socialist Alliance Party	unknown education unknown	
Eduard Manole	Born: 21 March 1964 (age 45); Constanța, Constanța County	Former presidential election: 2000: 1.2% (8th place, 1st round)	Affiliation: none	Faculty of Physics, University of Bucharest (unknown year) physicist	
Ovidiu-Cristian Iane	Born: 12 October 1970 (age 39); Craiova, Dolj County		Affiliation: PER	Faculty of International Economic Relations, Bucharest Academy of Economic Studies (unknown year); Faculty of Political Sciences, Bucharest (unknown year) unknown	
Constantin-Ninel Potîrcă	Born: 20 November 1967 (age 42); Târgu Jiu, Gorj County		Affiliation: none	unknown studies used iron recycler	

== Campaign ==
=== First round ===
The main contenders, incumbent Băsescu and the President of the Parliament Mircea Geoană, offered different ways to tackle the economic crisis, Romania being in the grip of severe recession with the economy expected to contract eight percent in 2009. While Geoană offered to increase investment to beat the recession and promised "vigorous measures" such as building affordable flats for young people and giving cheap credits to enterprises in order to help create jobs, Băsescu pledged to cut public spending. Băsescu also promised more equity to people living in the countryside. Christian Mititelu, a political commentator quoted by the BBC, argued that due to extremely vigorous political strife there was no real campaign debate about how the economy should recover or on the structure of the next year's budget, and that the public were not sufficiently aware of these economic issues, while the contenders did not attempt to communicate and involve the public in such decisions.

Băsescu tried to portray himself as the champion of the people against what he called "the corrupt political elite". A widely used election poster carried the text: "They cannot avoid what they are afraid of". Băsescu's opponents countered that he is part of that elite, simply with different backers. In a Cluj-Napoca meeting with supporters he claimed he "was the one to stop doubtful privatisations", implicitly accusing rival Social-Democrats of underhand practices while in power. He vowed to fight against the Parliament, which blocked his bid to install the Croitoru cabinet, and the "media moguls". In the campaign for the first round, his favorite campaign theme was reducing the number of lawmakers. This theme proved popular with the overwhelming majority of the electorate voting for the reduction of the number of lawmakers from current 471 to a maximum of 300, and in favor of a transition from the current bicameral parliament to a unicameral one in a referendum held simultaneously with the first round of elections. One of Băsescu's favorite themes is his fight against parliament and media moguls such as businessmen Dan Voiculescu, Sorin Ovidiu Vântu, and Dinu Patriciu, politicians Ion Iliescu, Viorel Hrebenciuc, and Marian Vanghelie.

The main counter-candidate, Geoană, on the other hand, described himself as a "man of dialogue", who can "restore Romania's unity", allegedly "jeopardized" by Băsescu. A former ambassador to the United States, former foreign minister, and a seasoned diplomat, Geoană edged aside more powerful figures in his Social Democratic party.

In the first round held on 22 November, Băsescu came first with 32.44% of the votes, and Geoană second with 31.15%. According to a BBC analyst a victory by Geoană would be caused by the numerous enemies Băsescu has made during his tenure, especially in the media. On the other hand, a victory of the incumbent could be generated by his counter-candidate alleged lack of "human touch", and because doubts remain over his ability to control the "red barons" in his own party. Crin Antonescu [of the National Liberals who scored third with 20.02%] was the first choice of all those who are fed up with Băsescu but could not bring themselves to vote Socialist. His voters hold the key to victory on 6 December.

=== Second round ===
Although Băsescu claimed the results of the first round were "a significant vote for the right" because he and Crin Antonescu together received over 50% of the vote, the next day Antonescu refused to back Băsescu in the runoff, and shortly thereafter announced an alliance with Geoană. Subsequently, Băsescu reproached Antonescu to "have thrown himself in the arms of the Social Democratic party, a party opposed to reforms", and added "This alliance will bring us back to 20 years ago when the PSD was controlling all state institutions". Antonescu in turn called Băsescu "a demagogue and a populist", and vowed to support Geoană as "the lesser of two evils". Geoană also gained the support of Béla Markó with his UDMR/RMDSZ and George Becali with his New Generation Party – Christian Democratic.

Sorin Oprescu decided not to support anyone and Corneliu Vadim Tudor with his PRM—at national level—called his voters to boycott the runoff round; however the PRM in Sibiu County decided to support Geoană. Geoană announced he would nominate Klaus Iohannis as prime minister if he won.

Geoană promised to appoint Klaus Iohannis as Prime Minister of Romania if he was elected president. Iohannis was the candidate supported by a majority in the Parliament of Romania. Romania had a caretaker government since the government of Emil Boc fell on 13 October. The parliament rejected Traian Băsescu's nomination of Lucian Croitoru for new prime minister on 4 November.

== Opinion polls ==
Note: Opinion polls have been criticised in this election for their unreliability, with large differences in results obtained between different polling agencies.

=== First round ===
Polling Firm	Date	Source	Băsescu	Geoană	Antonescu	Oprescu	Tudor	Kelemen	Others	Undecided
GSS	16 May 2009		30.8%	24.3%	20.3%		5.5%	N/A	7.8%	5%
CURS	26 June 2009		36%	24%	20%		11%	2%	3%	N/A
INSOMAR	12 July 2009		35.7%	29.6%	16.8%		11.9%	N/A	N/A	N/A
Gallup Romania	16–20 July 2009		35%	18%	20%		10%	3%	N/A	N/A
CCSB	17–19 September 2009		34%	18%	19%	12%	7%	1%	N/A	N/A
INSOMAR	8–11/10/09		33.4%	28.5%	14.5%	8.1%	6.1%	4.3%	N/A	N/A
CSOP	16–18 October 2009		35%	24%	19%	8%	4%	4%	N/A	N/A
CURS	15–22 October 2009		31%	30%	17%	9%	5%	4%	4%	N/A
BCS	19 October 2009		31.3%	21.9%	23.8%	10.4%	3.7%	3.8%	5.1%	N/A
Operations Research	20–23 October 2009		31%	21%	22%	12%	6%	29/10-1/11 /09	6%	
INSOMAR	29/10–1/11 /09		30%	32%	19%	6%	7%	3%	5.1%	N/A
Gallup Romania	01–03/11/09		32.5%	21.5%	21.5%	11%	5%	2.5%	N/A	
CCSB	3 November 2009		34%	30%	18%	14%	3%	1%	1%	
INSOMAR	9 November 2009		31%	32%	18%	5%	6%	5%	N/A	
CCSB	11 November 2009		34%	31%	16%	10%	4%	3%	2%	
Operations Research	15 November 2009		30%	23%	26%	8%	6%	4%	3%	
CSOP	18 November 2009		37%	27%	20%	6%	3%	5%	2%	
Operations Research	19 November 2009		32.5%	23.5%	24.5%	7%	6%	4%	2.5%	

==== Exit polls ====
Polling Firm	Source	Băsescu	Geoană	Antonescu	Tudor	Kelemen	Oprescu
CSOP	Gândul	33.2%	30.3%	22%		4.9%	
CURS	TVR	33.7%	31.4%	21.5%	4.2%	3.3%	3.2%
INSOMAR	Realitatea TV	32.8%	31.7%	21.8%	4%	3.6%	3.5%
CCSB	Antena 3	34.1%	30.9%	22.1%	3.6%	3.6%	3.4%

=== Second round ===
Băsescu vs Geoană

Polling Firm	Date	Source	Băsescu	Geoană
INCOR	28 June 2009		52%	48%
CCSB	27 July 2009		53%	47%
CCSB	3 October 2009		47%	53%
CSOP	7 October 2009		53%	47%
INSOMAR	8–11/10/09		49.4%	50.6%
CURS	26 October 2009		50%	50%
INSOMAR	29/10–1/11 /09		47%	53%
CCSB	3 November 2009		46%	54%
INSOMAR	6–9/11 /09		47%	53%
INSOMAR	28–29/11 /09		46%	54%

==== Exit polls ====
Polling Firm	Date	Source	Băsescu	Geoană
INSOMAR 21:00	6 /12 /09		48.8%	51.2%
CSOP 21:00	6 /12 /09		50.4%	49.6%
CURS 21:00	6 /12 /09		49.3%	50.7%
CCSB 21:00	6 /12 /09		49%	51%

== Results ==
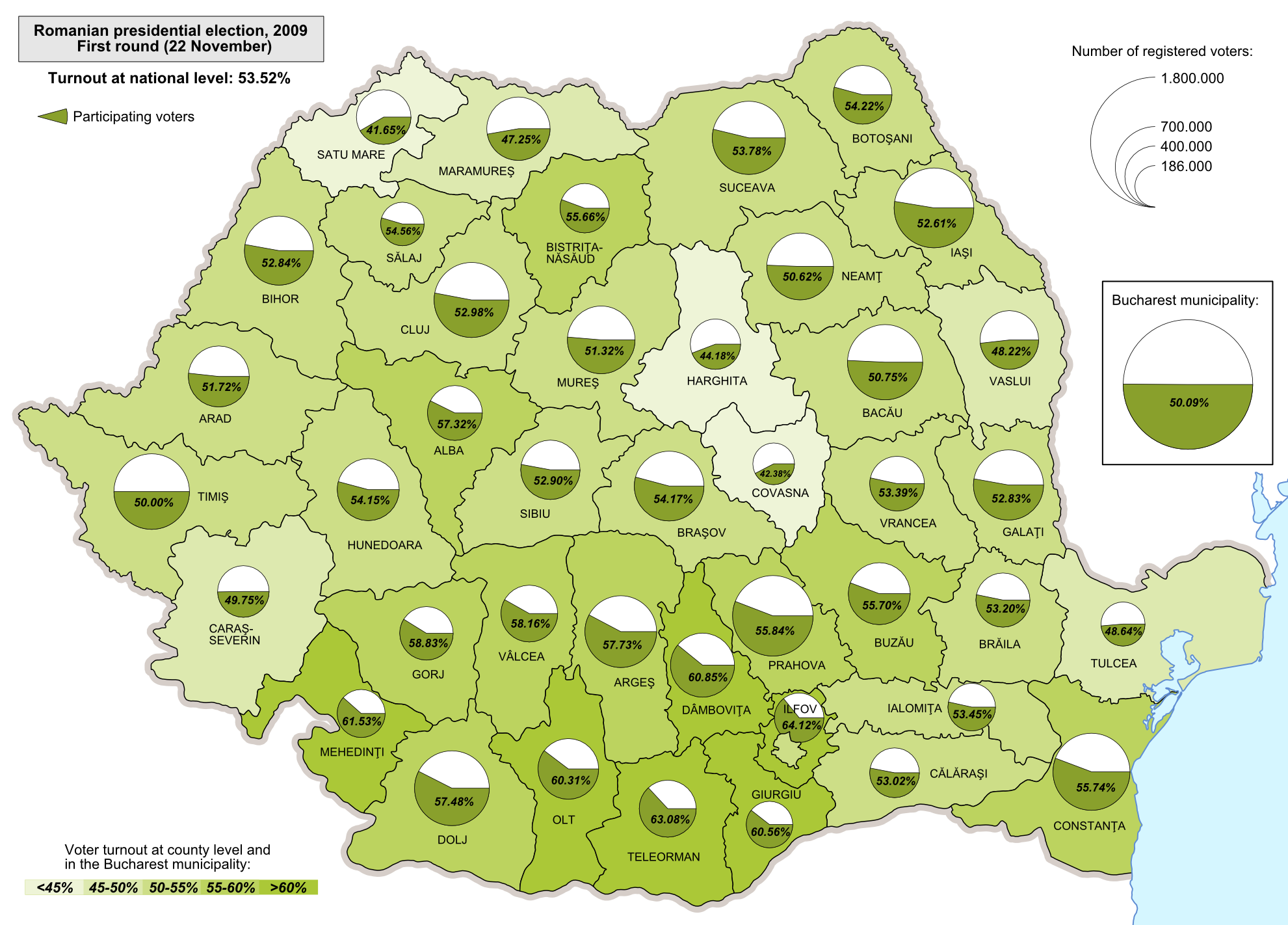
Voter turnout for the 2009 Romanian Presidential election – First round

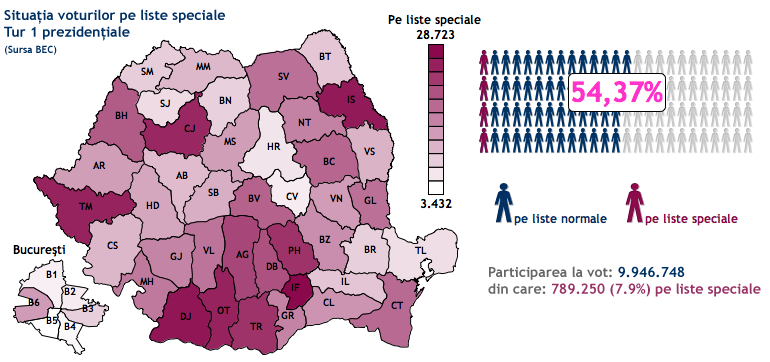
Number of votes on "special lists" – First round

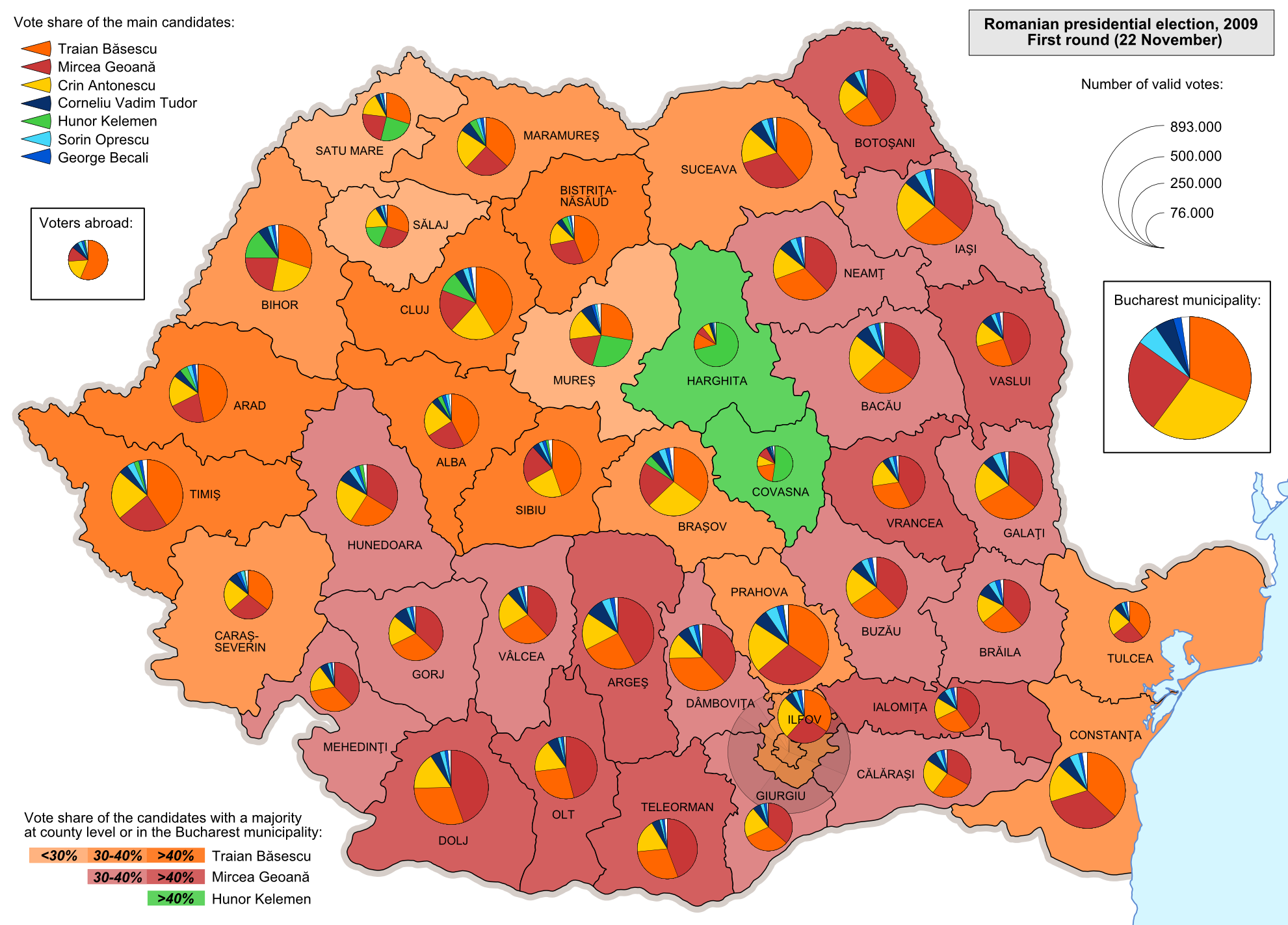
The results of the first voting round by county and in the Bucharest municipality

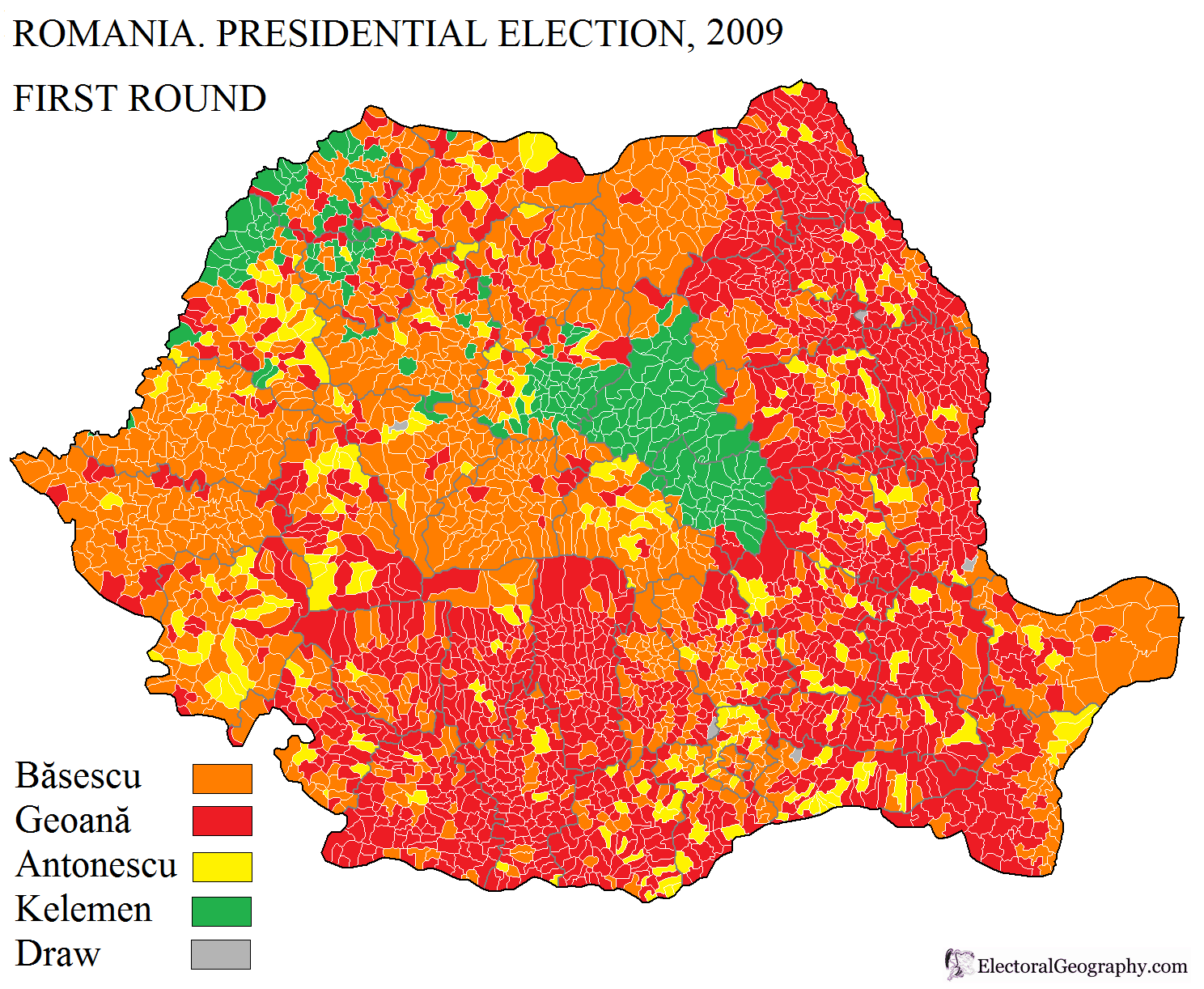
The results of the first voting round by communes (some commune borders are inaccurate)

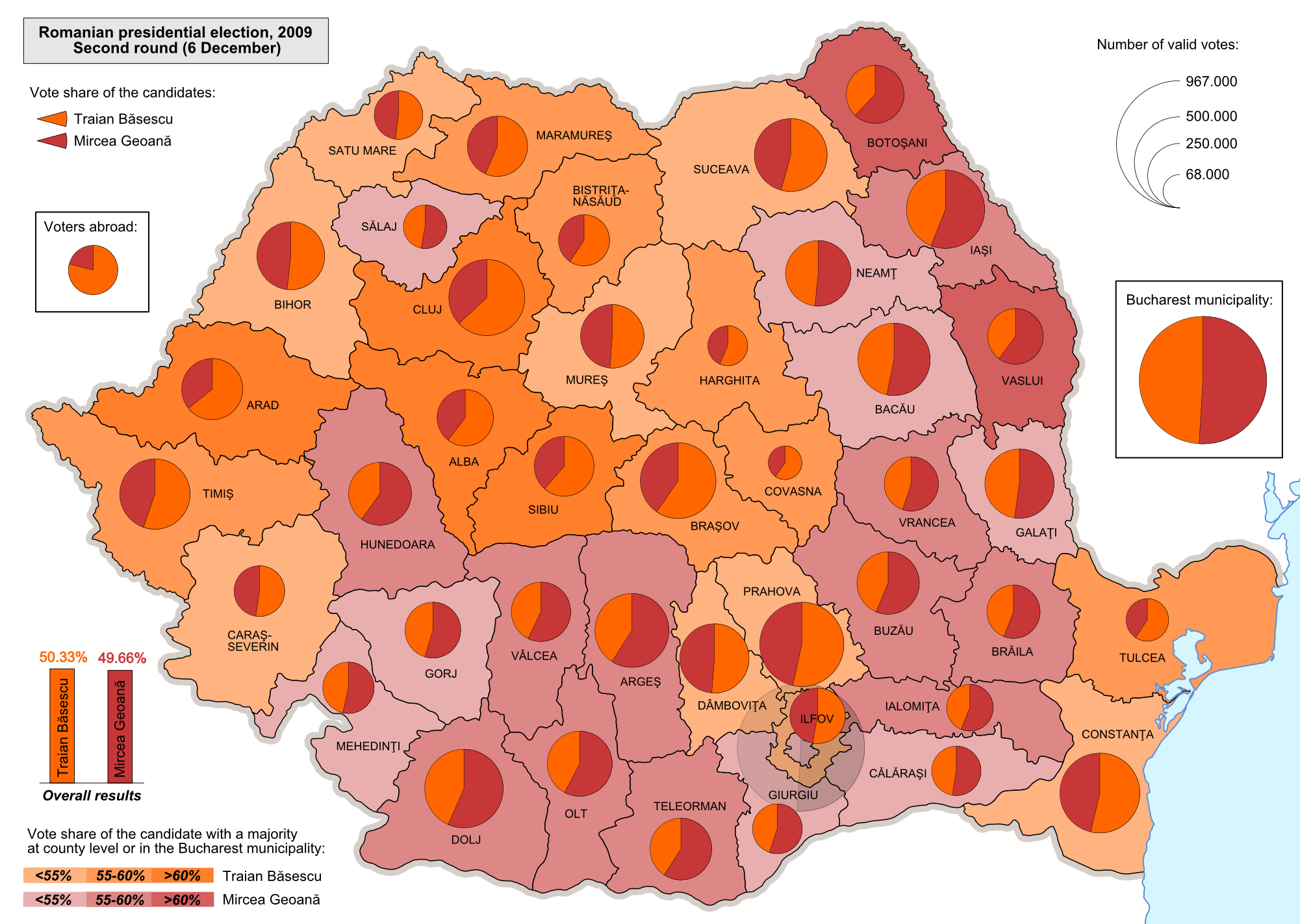
The results of the second voting round by county and in the Bucharest municipality

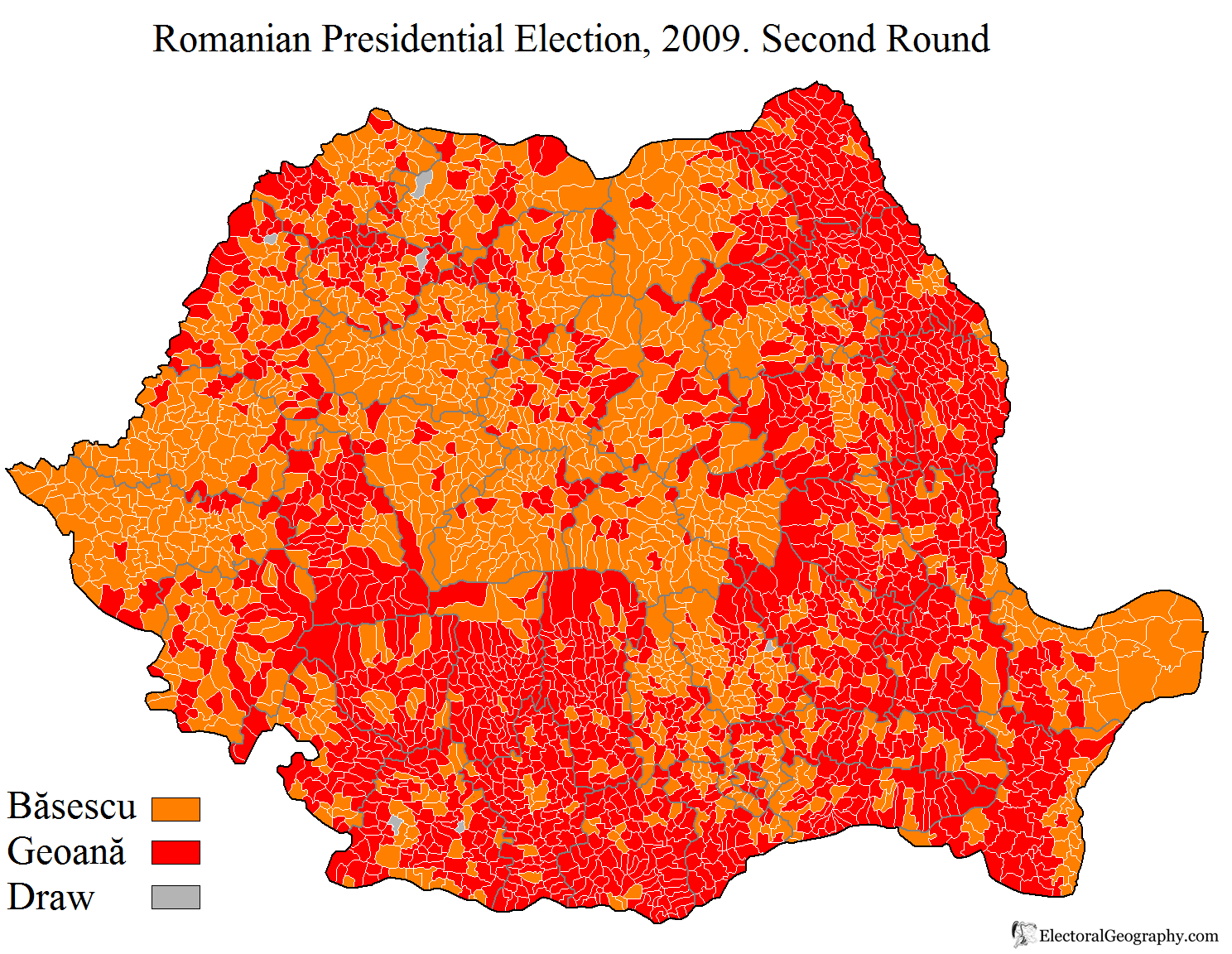
The results of the second voting round by communes (some commune borders are inaccurate)

Both runoff candidates declared themselves winners after tight exit polls. On Monday, 7 December 2009 at 8 am, BEC published the first official partial results, after having counted the votes from 95.4% of the total of 21706 poll stations. According to these partial results, Traian Băsescu had achieved 50.43% of the total eligible votes, while Mircea Geoană got the rest of 49.57%. The official partial results tallied at 10:16 am (Monday, 7 December 2009) attested that Traian Băsescu achieved 50.37% of the total eligible votes and Mircea Geoană 49.62%. A majority of 79% the votes from abroad, fully counted in this tally, went for Băsescu (115,831 to 31,045). Some 94% of the estimated 200,000 Moldovans with Romanian citizenship who voted in the election cast their vote for Băsescu, who has been a vocal advocate of Moldovans' right to regain Romanian citizenship. Following final results, Sibiu mayor Klaus Iohannis announced that he is abandoning his bid to become prime minister in the current situation. Romanian stock markets fell to a four-month low after the official results were announced, deepening a political crisis that threatens ties with international lenders.

Candidate	Party	First round		Second round	
Candidate	Party	Votes	%	Votes	%
Traian Băsescu	Independent (PDL)	3,153,640	32.45	5,275,808	50.33
Mircea Geoană	Social Democratic Party	3,027,838	31.15	5,205,760	49.67
Crin Antonescu	National Liberal Party	1,945,831	20.02		
Corneliu Vadim Tudor	Greater Romania Party	540,380	5.56		
Hunor Kelemen	Democratic Alliance of Hungarians in Romania	372,764	3.84		
Sorin Oprescu	Independent	309,764	3.19		
George Becali	New Generation Party	186,390	1.92		
Remus Cernea	Green Party	60,539	0.62		
Constantin Rotaru	Socialist Alliance Party	43,684	0.45		
Gheorghe-Eduard Manole	Independent	34,189	0.35		
Ovidiu-Cristian Iane	Ecologist Party of Romania	22,515	0.23		
Constantin-Ninel Potîrcă	Independent	21,306	0.22		
Total		9,718,840	100.00	10,481,568	100.00
Valid votes		9,718,840	97.71	10,481,568	98.70
Invalid/blank votes		227,446	2.29	138,476	1.30
Total votes		9,946,286	100.00	10,620,044	100.00
Registered voters/turnout		18,293,277	54.37	18,303,224	58.02
Source: ROAEP

Vote share
Second round
Băsescu	50.33%
Geoană	49.67%
First round
Băsescu	32.45%
Geoană	31.15%
Antonescu	20.02%
Tudor	5.56%
Kelemen	3.84%
Oprescu	3.19%
Becali	1.92%
Others	1.87%

== Aftermath ==
=== Accusations of electoral fraud ===
The opposition has decided to contest the result; Mircea Geoană announced that the Social Democrats will contest the elections at the Constitutional Court and will submit evidence of electoral fraud. PSD Secretary General Liviu Dragnea cited "a high number of void ballots, modified voting protocols, and massive electoral tourism". Dragnea stated: "Romanians voted for Mircea Geoană, but Băsescu's state apparatus is trying to make him the presidential winner through fraud". Former Prime Minister Adrian Năstase and former President Ion Iliescu, both PSD members, also stated that they doubted the results.

Mircea Geoană has also stated that the Social Democrats exclude any collaboration with Băsescu and his party, and maintain the majority with the Liberals and Hungarian Democrats, while Crin Antonescu also stated that the Liberal Party excludes "any participation in a Traian Băsescu puppet government".

=== Constitutional Court proceedings ===
On 8 December, the Social Democratic Party submitted their request to annul and repeat the presidential election run-off to the Constitutional Court, saying the election was rigged.

On 11 December, in an unprecedented decision the Constitutional Court decided to recount all 138,476 invalid votes. After 137,613 invalid votes recounted, only 2,137 were revalidated (1.6% of recounted invalid votes), 1,169 votes for Traian Băsescu and 968 for Mircea Geoană.

On 14 December, the Constitutional Court rejected the request to repeat the presidential elections, paving the way to validate Băsescu's election. The same day, Geoană admitted defeat and wished Băsescu good luck in his second term in office.
