= Alex Mihai Stoenescu =

Romanian writer, journalist and politician

Alex Mihai Stoenescu (born October 2, 1953) is a Romanian writer, journalist and politician.

== Biography ==
According to his own admission, Stoenescu collaborated in 1984 with the Romanian Communist secret police, the Securitate, while he worked as an engineer at a factory in Băneasa. However, he claims it was out of patriotism, and he only gave technical details about some equipment bought by the company he worked for.

After the Romanian Revolution, he worked as a journalist and then as chief of the Press Department of the National Defense Ministry. In 1998, president Emil Constantinescu intended to name him spokesman of the presidency, until Constantinescu learnt about his collaboration with the Securitate.

Stoenescu was a vice president of Uniunea Forţelor de Dreapta, resigning from it in 2000, following the unsatisfactory results in the local elections, joining the National Liberal Party in August 2000. In 2006, Stoenescu joined the New Generation – Christian Democratic Party, being chosen vice president in charge of its doctrine. He was also part of the team of historians whom Gigi Becali commissioned to write the "true history of Romania". Stoenescu was among several important members of this party to resign in 2007.

== Work ==
Stoenescu's historical work has been considered controversial, especially his works about the rule of Ion Antonescu and the 1989 revolution.

In his work The Army, the Marshall and the Jews, which deals with the Antonescu era, he claims that the Iași pogrom occurred because Antonescu "practically ceded" the city's Romanian sovereignty to the Germans, who were thus responsible for the mass killings. This attitude is considered by Romanian Holocaust scholar Michael Shafir as being "deflective negationism", a form of Holocaust denial in which the guilt is deflected toward other groups, such as the Germans. The book also claims that the deaths of thousands of Jews in the "Death Trains" in Romania can be attributed to negligence, not intent. He also accepted without question the era's propaganda that those deported were "communists" who attacked the Romanian and German troops, while concluding that it was not the first time in history when thousands of innocents paid for the deeds of "a handful of [Jewish communist] culprits". Shafir described Stoenescu as a "notorious antisemite".

Stoenescu's multi-volume work History of coup d'etats in Romania also received harsh criticism because of its depiction of Romanian far-right groups. For instance, he claims that the Iron Guard was not antisemitic in its early days. Stoenescu states that Corneliu Zelea Codreanu was originally just anti-communist; his antisemitism was simply a reaction to the Jews' preference for left-wing politics and the threat of Bolshevism they brought about. The same book also claims that the "Death Squads" of the Legionnaire movement were not really groups of assassins, but just "legionnaires willing to risk their life", who did not intend "to bring death on others." Stoenescu claims that their image has been distorted by Communist propaganda.

== Bibliography ==
=== History ===
- "Istoria loviturilor de stat din România", Vol. I - "Revoluţie şi francmasonerie", 2001
- "Istoria loviturilor de stat din România", Vol. II - "Esecul democraţiei române", 2001
- "Istoria loviturilor de stat din România", Vol. III - "Cele trei dictaturi", 2002
- "Istoria loviturilor de stat din România", Vol. IV, part 1 - "Revoluţia din Decembrie 1989 - o tragedie românească", 2004
- "Istoria loviturilor de stat din România", Vol. IV, part 2 - "Revoluţia din Decembrie 1989 - o tragedie românească", 2005
- "Armata, mareşalul şi evreii", 1998
- "Interviuri despre revoluţie", 2004
- "Dinastia Brătianu", 2002

=== Literary works ===
- "Patimile Sfântului Tomaso D'Aquino", 2003
- "Noaptea incendiului", 2000
- "Misiunea dominicană", 1997
