= New Generation Party (Romania) =

Political party in Romania

New Generation Party – Christian Democratic Partidul Noua Generație – Creștin Democrat
- President: Gigi Becali
- Founded: 2000; 26 years ago
- Dissolved: 5 July 2022
- Headquarters: Blănari Street, Bucharest, Romania
- Ideology: Neolegionarism; Romanian nationalism Right-wing populism Christian right Social conservatism National conservatism
- Political position: Far-right
- Colours: Green

Website
- www.png.ro

The New Generation Party – Christian Democratic (Partidul Noua Generație – Creștin Democrat, PNGCD; formerly Partidul Noua Generație, PNG) was a neo-legionary political party in Romania.

Created in 2000 as a centrist grouping around former Mayor of Bucharest Viorel Lis, it was taken over in January 2004 by businessman Gigi Becali (owner of FC Steaua București), who became its leader. Its ideology has since changed to extreme nationalism and Orthodox Christianity. Since then, it has pursued a radically nationalistic, xenophobic and homophobic scheme. In the 2004 legislative elections, PNG won 2.2% of the popular vote but no seats in the Chamber of Deputies and Senate.

For the 2009 European Parliament election, the PNGCD forged an electoral alliance with the far-right Greater Romania Party (PRM). PNGCD leader Becali was elected member of the European Parliament on the PRM list. The party's ideology under Becali's leadership is close to that of the pre-war fascist Iron Guard (or "Legionary Movement"). It fuses nationalist mythology with Christian Orthodox conservatism. Becali is a self-declared follower of the Legionary Movement. The Romanian National Council for Combating Discrimination has repeatedly charged Becali with homophobic, sexist and discriminatory statements against Romani and other ethnic minorities. The United States Department of State has described the New Generation Party as an "extreme nationalist party" and noted the party's use of a slogan of the 1930s antisemitic Legionary Movement.

== Notable members ==
- Dan Pavel - executive president, former advisor of Gigi Becali, political science professor.
- Alex Mihai Stoenescu - vice president, historian.
- Marian Oprea - vice president, talk-show host (on DDTV) and owner of Lumea (international politics magazine).

== Electoral history ==
=== Legislative elections ===
Election	Chamber			Senate			Position	Aftermath
Election	Votes	%	Seats	Votes	%	Seats	Position	Aftermath
2000	19,662	0.16	0 / 345	27,576	0.25	0 / 140	20th	Extra-parliamentary opposition to PDSR minority government
2004	227,443	2.23	0 / 332	241,486	2.36	0 / 137	5th	Extra-parliamentary support to DA-PUR-UDMR government (until April 2007)
2004	227,443	2.23	0 / 332	241,486	2.36	0 / 137	5th	Extra-parliamentary support to PNL-UDMR minority government
2008	156,901	2.3	0 / 334	174,519	2.53	0 / 137	6th	Extra-parliamentary opposition to PDL-PSD government (until December 2009)
2008	156,901	2.3	0 / 334	174,519	2.53	0 / 137	6th	Extra-parliamentary opposition to PDL-UNPR-UDMR (until May 2012)
2008	156,901	2.3	0 / 334	174,519	2.53	0 / 137	6th	Extra-parliamentary support to USL government (until December 2012)
2012	did not compete^{1}		1 / 412	did not compete^{1}		0 / 176	-	Supported USL government (until March 2014)
2012	did not compete^{1}		1 / 412	did not compete^{1}		0 / 176	-	Opposition to PSD-UNPR-UDMR-PC government (until December 2014)
2012	did not compete^{1}		1 / 412	did not compete^{1}		0 / 176	-	Opposition to PSD-UNPR-ALDE government (until November 2015)
2012	did not compete^{1}		1 / 412	did not compete^{1}		0 / 176	-	Support to Cioloș Cabinet (Ind.)
2016	did not compete							

Notes:

^{1} PNG-CD competed on PNL ballot.

=== Presidential elections ===
Election	Candidate	First round			Second round		
Election	Candidate	Votes	Percentage	Position	Votes	Percentage	Position
2000	did not compete						
2004	Gigi Becali	184,560	1.8%	6th			
2009	Gigi Becali	186,390	1.91%	7th			
2014	did not compete						
2019	did not compete						

=== European elections ===
Election	Votes	Percentage	MEPs	Position	EU Party	EP Group
2007	248,863	4.85%	0 / 32	6th	—	—
2009	did not compete^{1}		1 / 32	—	—	NI
2014	did not compete				—	—
2019	did not compete				—	—

Notes:

^{1} PNG-CD competed on PRM ballot.

== See also ==
- Category:New Generation Party (Romania) politicians
