= Steaua fans =

People who support Steaua București and FCSB, a Romanian sports club

The term Steaua fans refers to all people who support Steaua București and FCSB, a Romanian sports club with several departments and a Romanian football club, respectively.

As Steaua is, judging by performances, the most successful Romanian football team, they enjoy the biggest support among Romanian football fans. A survey conducted in 2004 suggested that the Ghencea-based team accounts for approximately 42% of all Romanian football lovers, meaning about five million fans inside and outside Romania's borders. Following the 2014 decision by the High Court of Cassation and Justice in the case initiated three years prior, where CSA Steaua București sued FC FCSB for the unlawful use of the Steaua name and trademark, the fanbase has split.

== History ==
=== Origins (1947–1995) ===
As the club of the Romanian Army, Steaua drew its early supporters primarily from those with military ties. The first waves of new fans came at the beginning of the 1950s, when success brought the club greater recognition.

It was not until 1974 with the erection of Stadionul Steaua in south-western Bucharest that the Steaua zones of supporters came to standardize themselves in the regions adjacent to the arena, subsequently covering the whole southern half of Bucharest, a city geographically divided by the Dâmbovița River. In 1986, Steaua gained attention following the successful run in the European Cup.

=== Armata Ultra' (1995–2001) ===
The Steaua Ultras movement began on 4 December 1995, when the bases of Armata Ultra (AU), the first Ultras group in Bucharest (and the second in Romania), were set. For years, AU dominated the Ultra movement in Romania. It quickly reached an impressive number of 4,000 members, a record which stands up to this day for supporter groups in the country. Basically they adopted a far-right Steaua ideology with very strict internal rules, both inside and outside matches, such as no smoking, no eating, no drinking, no sitting, only standing and chanting. They stood out by their high number of membres, the big crowds dispatched to away games, chant power and trouble making, as AU had important hooligan influences. Many saw the disappearance of AU as something like the death of a legend. This occurred in 2001, due to internal problems, when smaller groups appeared, such as Gruppo Apparte and Brigada XXL which, in some manner, identified themselves with AU and gradually messed with their policy, style and way of life. These intrusions culminated with a conflict of their leader, Jean Pavel, with the Steaua Board of Administration. Even though extinct, Armata Ultra's spirit still lives on in most Steaua fans and a great lot of them still identify themselves with AU, as it probably was the strongest, most important ever Ultra group in Romania.

== AISS - AS47 ==
In 2006, the supporters have formed their own official supporters' association, following the example of most European clubs. Asociația Independentă a Suporterilor Steliști (AISS; Steaua Supporters' Independent Association) was formed as a legal entity with its stated goals of 'protecting the interests and image of Steaua supporters', as well as 'identifying and promoting the club's perennial values'.

AISS has celebrated the club's 60th anniversary and has campaigned against investor George Becali's influence on the club's traditions and values, which the association views as harmful.

Over time, the association gradually ceased its activities. In 2017, when Steaua București was reinstated in the 4th division, a new association, called AS47 - Asociaţia Steliştilor 1947, was founded by former AISS members with the aim of defending the interests of Steaua fans, promoting the club's values and achievements, and sponsoring the football team.
