= 2009 Comorian parliamentary election =

Parliamentary elections were held in the Comoros on 6 December 2009, with a second round on 20 December. The elections were originally scheduled for July 2009, but were postponed until after a constitutional referendum was held in May 2009. They were then scheduled to take place on 29 November, but were delayed again. The result was a victory for the Baobab Movement, a coalition supporting President Ahmed Abdallah Mohamed Sambi.

== Electoral system ==
The elections were held using the two-round system with 24 single-member constituencies. The remaining nine seats in the Assembly of the Union were filled by appointees from the assemblies of the autonomous islands of the Comoros, Grande Comore, Mohéli and Anjouan, with each island selecting three members.

== Campaign ==
Most candidates supporting President Sambi campaigned as the Baobab coalition, named after their identifying symbol, the Baobab tree.

== Results ==
Party	First round			Second round			Total seats
Party	Votes	%	Seats	Votes	%	Seats	Total seats
Baobab Movement	59,692	33.21	3	88,660	50.60	14	17
Other supporters of President Sambi	5,019	2.79	0	8,296	4.73	3	3
Others	115,039	64.00	0	78,266	44.67	4	4
Island Representatives							9
Total	179,750	100.00	3	175,222	100.00	21	33
Registered voters/turnout	363,967	–					
Source: Al Watan, Psephos, IPU

=== By constituency ===
Nº1 Dewa
Candidate	Party	First round		Second round	
Candidate	Party	Votes	%	Votes	%
Ahmed Daroumi	Baobab Movement	1,248	45.38	1,455	53.85
Hamada Madi Ali	Other	708	25.75	1,247	46.15
Aboubacar Hassane	Other	640	23.27		
Zaouenti Imani Hilal	Other	154	5.60		
Total		2,750	100.00	2,702	100.00

Nº2 Msoutrouni and Moimbassa
Candidate	Party	First round		Second round	
Candidate	Party	Votes	%	Votes	%
Sitti Kassim Soufou	Baobab Movement	1,177	35.95	1,639	46.60
Abdallah Said Sarouma	Other	1,068	32.62	1,878	53.40
Said Ahmed Zaki	Other	885	27.03		
Hadidja Mansourou	Other	144	4.40		
Total		3,274	100.00	3,517	100.00

Nº3 Djando
Candidate	Party	First round		Second round	
Candidate	Party	Votes	%	Votes	%
Djabir Abdou	Other	711	31.60	1,298	53.33
Abdallah Ahamadi Attoumane	Baobab Movement	695	30.89	1,136	46.67
Ali Youssoufa Boina	Other	480	21.33		
Saindou Youssoufa Djabir	Other	268	11.91		
Ambdi Madi Boina	Other	96	4.27		
Total		2,250	100.00	2,434	100.00

Nº4 Mledjele
Candidate	Party	First round		Second round	
Candidate	Party	Votes	%	Votes	%
Sad Ali Dahalane	Baobab Movement	1,023	36.07	1,341	49.80
Bianrifi Tarmidi	Other	1,020	35.97	1,352	50.20
Loifti Attoumane Ali	Other	552	19.46		
Abdou Bacar Soihir	Other	241	8.50		
Total		2,836	100.00	2,693	100.00

Nº5 Sima
Candidate	Party	First round		Second round	
Candidate	Party	Votes	%	Votes	%
Momamed Djaanfari M'soili	Other	4,431	38.64	5,613	49.91
Nourdine Fadhula	Baobab Movement	2,757	24.05	5,634	50.09
Mouhamadi Boinali	Other	2,513	21.92		
Ibrahim Ahamadi	Other	1,565	13.65		
Salim Abasse	Other	200	1.74		
Total		11,466	100.00	11,247	100.00

Nº6 Mutsamudu I
Candidate	Party	First round		Second round	
Candidate	Party	Votes	%	Votes	%
Mouhtar Elhad Abdou Salim	Baobab Movement	2,207	33.56	3,560	58.39
Abdou Sidi Said Omar	Other	1,424	21.65	2,537	41.61
Youssou Abdou Mari	Other	804	12.23		
Chamoussidine Youssouf	Other	785	11.94		
Sidi Bacar	Other	550	8.36		
Ahmed Mohamed B. Cheikh	Other	424	6.45		
Youssouf Miftahou	Other	382	5.81		
Total		6,576	100.00	6,097	100.00

Nº7 Mutsamudu II
Candidate	Party	First round		Second round	
Candidate	Party	Votes	%	Votes	%
Abdou Salami Abdou	Baobab Movement	1,958	43.42	3,864	65.50
Ahmed Djanffar	Other	1,615	35.82	2,035	34.50
Dhounouraine Ali Bacar	Other	641	14.22		
Abdou Said Houmadi	Other	168	3.73		
Ali Ousseni Chaffi	Other	127	2.82		
Total		4,509	100.00	5,899	100.00

Nº8 Ouani
Candidate	Party	Votes	%
Attoumane Allaoui	Baobab Movement	3,116	59.39
Mohamed Ahmed Ben Ali	Other	1,072	20.43
Said Ali Ahamada	Other	1,059	20.18
Total		5,247	100.00

Nº9 Cuvette
Candidate	Party	First round		Second round	
Candidate	Party	Votes	%	Votes	%
Mohamed Said Houmadi	Baobab Movement	1,952	40.70	4,006	69.02
Anli Attoumane Ismael	Other	1,271	26.50	1,798	30.98
Sadjadou Halidi	Other	747	15.58		
Soifa Ousseni	Other	531	11.07		
Abdou Yssoufi	Other	295	6.15		
Total		4,796	100.00	5,804	100.00

Nº10 Domoni I
Candidate	Party	Votes	%
Abdallah Amed Abderemane	Baobab Movement	2,703	57.98
Attoumane Issiaka	Other	1,527	32.75
Ahmed Mohaned El-Amine	Other	432	9.27
Total		4,662	100.00

Nº11 Domoni II
Candidate	Party	Votes	%
Amirddine Boura	Baobab Movement	4,306	66.08
Moursoid Massoudi	Other	1,586	24.34
Abdou Oili	Other	624	9.58
Total		6,516	100.00

Nº12 Nioumakele I
Candidate	Party	First round		Second round	
Candidate	Party	Votes	%	Votes	%
Mahamoud Attoumane	Baobab Movement	2,282	48.10	4,654	63.96
Said Ali Mahamou	Other	1,095	23.08	2,622	36.04
Moussa Houmadi	Other	864	18.21		
Abidou Mahamoud	Other	494	10.41		
Ahmed Samir Ahmed Ben Houmadi	Other	6	0.13		
Soumaila Haribou	Other	3	0.06		
Total		4,744	100.00	7,276	100.00

Nº13 Nioumakele II
Candidate	Party	First round		Second round	
Candidate	Party	Votes	%	Votes	%
Nassimou Ahamadi	Baobab Movement	1,882	35.34	3,689	55.16
Mohamed Soula	Other	1,490	27.98	2,999	44.84
Assani Houmadi	Other	638	11.98		
Kamal Issouf	Other	493	9.26		
Zaza Djaffar	Other	430	8.07		
Toihirdine Allaoui	Other	226	4.24		
Maendhu Ahamadi	Other	167	3.14		
Total		5,326	100.00	6,688	100.00

Nº14 Moroni North
Candidate	Party	First round		Second round	
Candidate	Party	Votes	%	Votes	%
Ibrahime Mohamed Soulé	Other	1,121	34.94	1,626	46.42
Abdoulfatah Said Mohamed	Supporter of Sambi	899	28.02	1,877	53.58
Mahamoud Ali Mohamed Boina	Other	305	9.51		
Ali Said Ridjali	Other	266	8.29		
Said Chaehoi Soilihi	Other	258	8.04		
Soulé Ali Ali M'zé Hamadi	Other	129	4.02		
Said Mohamed Habib	Other	126	3.93		
Ali Mliva Youssouf	Other	104	3.24		
Total		3,208	100.00	3,503	100.00

Nº15 Moroni South
Candidate	Party	First round		Second round	
Candidate	Party	Votes	%	Votes	%
Ahmed Moumini Soefou	Supporter of Sambi	1,462	40.63	2,112	54.29
Soilihi Mohamed Soilihi	Other	885	24.60	1,778	45.71
Samra Bacar Kassim	Other	294	8.17		
Said Mohamed El Amine	Other	229	6.36		
Mohamed Papa Mdjassiri	Other	194	5.39		
Mouhoussine Hassani	Other	156	4.34		
Moilime Djoussouf Moilime	Other	146	4.06		
Hafsoita Hamada	Other	116	3.22		
Djaffar El-Amdjad Said Ounkachat	Other	116	3.22		
Total		3,598	100.00	3,890	100.00

Nº16 Bambao
Candidate	Party	First round		Second round	
Candidate	Party	Votes	%	Votes	%
Alhadhur Alif Mohamed	Baobab Movement	4,425	30.43	9,963	55.44
M'zé Madi Mariama	Other	3,902	26.83	8,007	44.56
Youssouf Mohamed Boina	Other	2,751	18.92		
Aboudou Assimakou Ali	Other	1,952	13.42		
Nassuri Mzé Mroivili	Other	974	6.70		
Issa Ben Said Mogné	Other	539	3.71		
Total		14,543	100.00	17,970	100.00

Nº17 Oichili-Dimani
Candidate	Party	First round		Second round	
Candidate	Party	Votes	%	Votes	%
Djaé Ahamada Chafi	Baobab Movement	2,987	34.22	6,282	62.91
Ali Mohamed Ali	Other	1,517	17.38	3,703	37.09
Ahamada Ali Mchangama	Other	1,290	14.78		
Ali Abdou Soimadou	Other	1,002	11.48		
Said Ben Youssoufa	Other	783	8.97		
Soulé Mdahoma Moueva	Other	694	7.95		
Ahmed Mohamed Mhoma	Other	455	5.21		
Total		8,728	100.00	9,985	100.00

Nº18 Itsandra North
Candidate	Party	First round		Second round	
Candidate	Party	Votes	%	Votes	%
Naoufal Boina Adam	Other	3,014	34.71	3,912	47.60
Hassani Ali Tabibou	Supporter of Sambi	2,658	30.61	4,307	52.40
Yahaya Mohamed Iliassa	Other	927	10.67		
Hassani Ali Ngazi	Other	715	8.23		
Hamada Abdou Mbechezi	Other	336	3.87		
Ibrahim Ali Mchangama	Other	281	3.24		
Ahmed Ali Youssouf	Other	274	3.16		
Mohamed Saleh Bin Ahmed	Other	264	3.04		
Ali M'sa Idjihadi	Other	215	2.48		
Total		8,684	100.00	8,219	100.00

Nº19 Itsandra South
Candidate	Party	First round		Second round	
Candidate	Party	Votes	%	Votes	%
Fahami Said Ibrahim	Baobab Movement	3,008	33.61	5,470	55.73
Mohamed Said Ahmed	Other	1,387	15.50	4,345	44.27
Allaoui Said Abasse	Other	971	10.85		
Boinaidi Abdou Elghaniyou	Other	942	10.53		
Soulé Said Hamadi	Other	711	7.94		
Aboubacari Charifou	Other	645	7.21		
Mohamed Mohamed Ali Día	Other	602	6.73		
Hassani Ahamada Youssouf	Other	474	5.30		
Mohamed Bacri Chakira	Other	210	2.35		
Total		8,950	100.00	9,815	100.00

Nº20 Mitsamiouli-Mboude
Candidate	Party	First round		Second round	
Candidate	Party	Votes	%	Votes	%
Djaffar Mohamed A Mansoib	Baobab Movement	5,318	30.48	9,554	53.77
Hamdi Mohamed Saidou	Other	4,487	25.72	8,215	46.23
Mihidhoir Sagaf	Other	2,442	14.00		
Ahamada Ali Mmadi	Other	1,930	11.06		
Said Abdou Djaé	Other	1,149	6.59		
Said Mohamed Adamou	Other	912	5.23		
Said Mohamed Mchangama	Other	691	3.96		
Abdou Saadi Ahamada	Other	518	2.97		
Total		17,447	100.00	17,769	100.00

Nº21 Hambou
Candidate	Party	First round		Second round	
Candidate	Party	Votes	%	Votes	%
Ibrahima Souef Mdahoma	Other	2,140	29.35	3,954	47.58
Bourhane Hamidou	Baobab Movement	1,960	26.88	4,357	52.42
Delapeyre Jean Emile	Other	950	13.03		
Mchami Msaidié	Other	689	9.45		
Ousseini Djoubeire	Other	652	8.94		
Said Abdallah Salim	Other	627	8.60		
Souna Ali Imamou	Other	273	3.74		
Total		7,291	100.00	8,311	100.00

Nº22 Hamahamet-Mboinkou
Candidate	Party	First round		Second round	
Candidate	Party	Votes	%	Votes	%
Mohamed Ali Soilihi	Baobab Movement	5,922	35.82	9,141	55.77
Hamidou Karihila	Other	3,622	21.91	7,249	44.23
Hamidou Bachirou	Other	2,627	15.89		
Mohamed Ahmed Idi	Other	2,235	13.52		
Ibrahim Ahmed	Other	1,116	6.75		
Mbaé Ali Ahmed	Other	845	5.11		
Said Mohamed Adamou	Other	156	0.94		
Said Mohamed Mchangama	Other	10	0.06		
Total		16,533	100.00	16,390	100.00

Nº23 Ngouengwe
Candidate	Party	First round		Second round	
Candidate	Party	Votes	%	Votes	%
Ibrahim Ali Mzimba	Other	4,934	36.36	7,044	60.43
Ibrahim Mhoumadi Sidi	Baobab Movement	3,377	24.89	4,613	39.57
Rihaoindro Saroumaia	Other	1,946	14.34		
Said Mogni	Other	1,527	11.25		
Maoulida Mohamed Maoulida	Other	1,014	7.47		
Said Abdallah Abdou Elkarim	Other	771	5.68		
Total		13,569	100.00	11,657	100.00

Nº24 Itsahidi
Candidate	Party	First round		Second round	
Candidate	Party	Votes	%	Votes	%
Abdillah Yahaya	Baobab Movement	5,389	44.00	8,302	62.16
Omar Tamou Boina	Other	2,339	19.10	5,054	37.84
Abasse Saadi	Other	2,134	17.42		
Mohamed Hassani	Other	1,343	10.97		
Ahamada Soilihi Mlatamou	Other	1,042	8.51		
Total		12,247	100.00	13,356	100.00
