= Sorin Oprescu =

Romanian politician (born 1951)

Dr. Sorin Oprescu M. D.
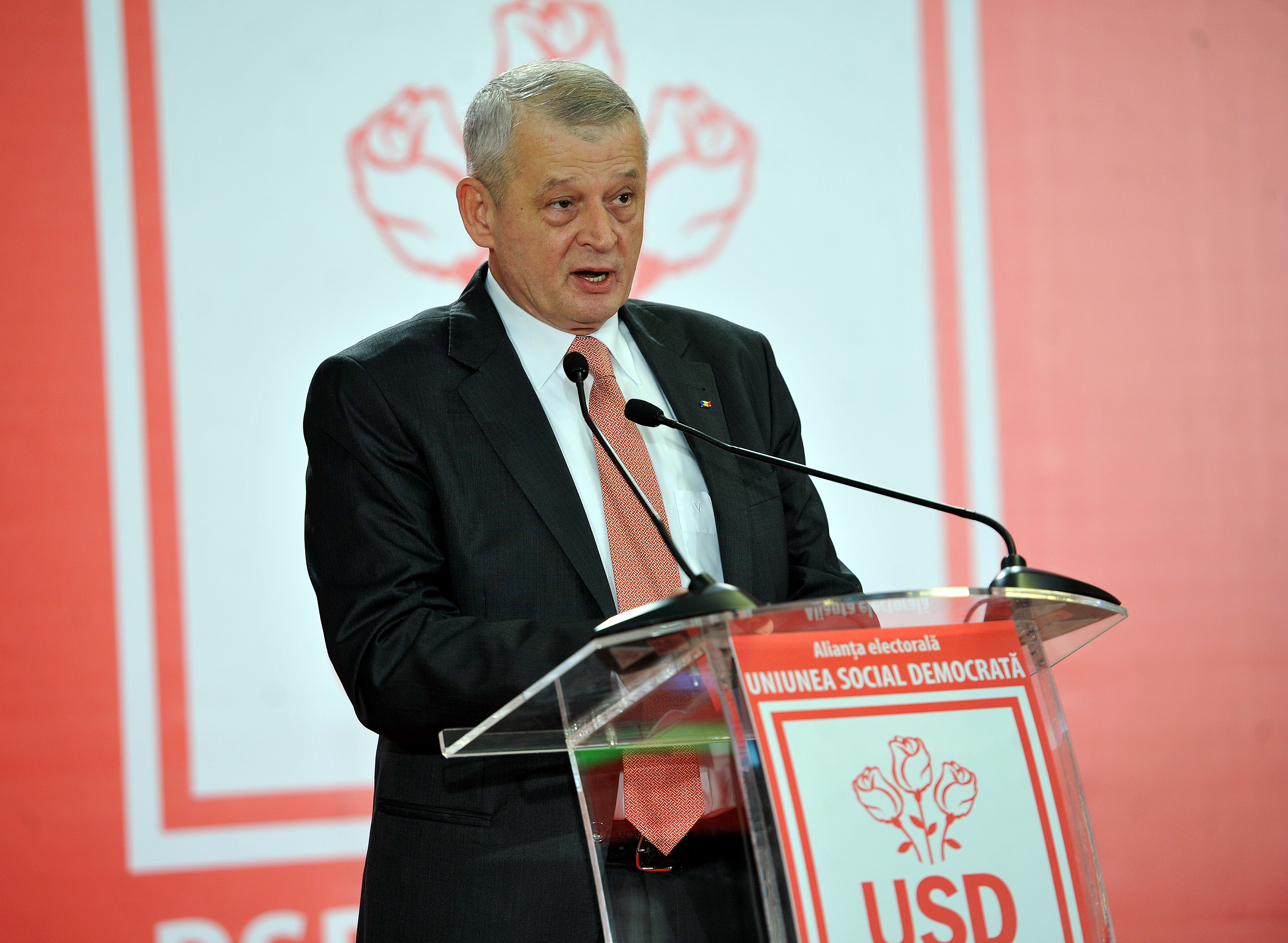

General Mayor of Bucharest
- In office 19 June 2008 – 15 September 2015
- Preceded by: Adriean Videanu
- Succeeded by: Marin Ștefănel Dan (interim)

Member of the Senate of Romania
- In office 11 December 2000 – 23 June 2008

Personal details
- Born: 7 November 1951 (age 74) Bucharest, Romania
- Party: Independent
- Other political affiliations: PSD (1990–2008)
- Awards: Legion of Honour

Sorin Mircea Oprescu (Romanian pronunciation: [soˈrin oˈpresku]; born 7 November 1951) is a Romanian independent politician and medical doctor who previously served as Mayor of Bucharest between 2008 and 2015.

== Political activity ==
Oprescu first ran for Mayor of Bucharest in 1998 backed by the Party of Social Democracy in Romania (PDSR), the precursor to the modern-day Social Democratic Party (PSD). He was eliminated in the first round with 19.3% of the vote, losing to incumbent Viorel Lis who was supported by the Christian Democratic National Peasants' Party (PNȚ-CD). He ran again in 2000, achieving the highest first-round total (40.1%) but losing in the second round with 49.3% to winner Traian Băsescu's 50.7%.

He was also a senator representing the Social Democratic Party (PSD) between 2000 and April 2008, serving as the vice-president of the Senate Committee for Public Health. Oprescu resigned from the Senate on 24 June 2008.

In February 2006, Oprescu also became the president of the Social Democratic Party's Bucharest branch, a position from which he stepped down upon quitting the party in April 2008.

In 2008, after the Social Democratic Party (PSD) refused to nominate him to the mayoral elections, he ran as an independent candidate. He earned the most votes in the first round of the elections. In the second round against the Democratic Liberal Party (PDL) candidate Vasile Blaga, with the support of the National Liberals and Social Democrats (who announced they would support anyone who ran against the Democratic Liberals), he won with 56.6% of the vote. Nevertheless, the Social-Democrat mayor of Bucharest's Sector 2, Neculai Onţanu, announced he supported Blaga, while the Social Democratic mayor of Sector 5, Marian Vanghelie, announced he would not support Oprescu and even accused him of being a "cheap demagogue".

He was one of the independent candidates running for President of Romania in the presidential election which took place on 22 November 2009. He was eliminated in the first round, gaining only 3.2% of the total cast votes and thereby placing on the 5th position, and was involved in a notable Condorcet cycle with Mircea Geoană and eventual winner Traian Băsescu.

== Conviction ==
In September 2015, Oprescu was arrested on charges of corruption. On 15 September 2015, after he had been deposed by Bucharest's Prefect upon a courts' decision to maintain his arrest, an interim successor was elected from among the city's deputy mayors.

== Electoral history ==
=== Mayor of Bucharest ===
Election	Affiliation	First round			Second round			Third round		
Election	Affiliation	Votes	Percentage	Position	Votes	Percentage	Position	Votes	Percentage	Position
1998	PDSR	111,759	19.3%	3rd	167,865	26.73%	2nd	322,825	49.48%	2nd
2000	PDSR	260,689	41.16%	1st	353,038	49.31%	2nd			
2008	Independent	164,219	30.12%	1st	315,981	56.31%	1st			
2012	Independent (supported by USL)	430,512	54.79%	1st						

=== Presidential elections ===
Election	Affiliation	First round			Second round		
Election	Affiliation	Votes	Percentage	Position	Votes	Percentage	Position
2009	Independent	309,764	3.18%	6th	not qualified		
