= 2009 Micronesian general election =

2009 Micronesian parliamentary election
- 3 March 2009

10 out of 14 seats in Congress

Parliamentary elections were held in the Federated States of Micronesia on 3 March 2009. As there were no political parties, all 21 candidates ran as independents. Three were returned unopposed.

== Electoral system ==
At the time of the election, Congress consisted of 14 members, of which 10 were elected for two-year terms and four elected for four-year terms. The 2009 elections were for the 10 two-year term seats.

== Conduct ==
The Asia Pacific Democracy Partnership (APDP) was invited to monitor the elections by the Micronesian government. The APDP sent 18 observers, who reported "some irregularities and procedural inconsistencies".

== Results ==
The results from nine constituencies were certified by the National Election Director on 16 March. A recount was ordered for one seat, with the winner confirmed on 24 March.

State	District	Candidate	Votes	%	Notes
Chuuk	Election District 1	Peter Sitan	1,911	41.04	Elected
Chuuk	Election District 1	Tender Haser Rickysach	1,373	29.49	
Chuuk	Election District 1	Able M. Kristoph	1,372	29.47	
Chuuk	Election District 2	Roger Mori	2,908	54.07	Elected
Chuuk	Election District 2	Tesime Kofot	2,470	45.93	
Chuuk	Election District 3	Joe N. Suka	2,569	39.90	Elected
Chuuk	Election District 3	Anucha Styephan Hallers	1,946	30.23	
Chuuk	Election District 3	Ignacio Stephen	1,923	29.87	
Chuuk	Election District 4	Tiwiter Aritos	3,866	54.31	Elected
Chuuk	Election District 4	Esly K. Kanto	3,252	45.69	
Chuuk	Election District 5	Tony Otto	928	33.32	Elected
Chuuk	Election District 5	Moses A. Nelson	903	32.42	
Chuuk	Election District 5	Lambert N. Lokopwe	777	27.90	
Chuuk	Election District 5	Masachiro Christlib	177	6.36	
Kosrae	Election District	Paliknoa K. Welly	1,811	100	Elected unopposed
Pohnpei	Election District 1	Dohsis Halbert	2,876	100	Elected unopposed
Pohnpei	Election District 2	Dion G. Neth	2,896	50.51	Elected
Pohnpei	Election District 2	Berny Martín	2,838	49.49	
Pohnpei	Election District 3	Fredrico Primo	2,737	100	Elected unopposed
Yap	Election District	Isaac V. Figir	2,104	76.59	Elected
Yap	Election District	Fidelis F. Thiyer	643	23.41	
