= November–December 2009 Moldovan presidential election =

2009 Moldovan presidential election
- 10 November 2009 (first round); 7 December 2009 (second round)
President before election
Mihai Ghimpu
(acting)
Liberal Party
Elected President
Election results annulled
Mihai Ghimpu
(acting)
Liberal Party

An indirect presidential election was held in Moldova on 10 November 2009 and 7 December 2009, following the parliamentary election held in July 2009.

== Pre-election developments ==
A first attempt had failed in May–June 2009 after the parliamentary election in April 2009, forcing a snap election and a second presidential election afterwards. If the election failed again, the constitution forbids a second early election in the same year, so snap elections would have been held in early 2010.

The PCRM suggested that they would be willing to support an independent candidate for president.

On August 8, 2009, four parties agreed to create the Alliance For European Integration, which pushed the Communist party into opposition. The Alliance For European Integration needed to elect a new president, an action which was impossible without having the support of at least 8 Communist MPs. The Alliance For European Integration had a narrow majority of 53 deputies out of 101 in the Moldovan Parliament, while the Communists had 48. At least 61 votes were needed to elect the new president.

Parliament held its first session on 28 August 2009. The Alliance for European Integration elected Mihai Ghimpu, leader of the Liberal Party as Parliament Speaker. It was announced on that date they would nominate Marian Lupu for President and Vlad Filat for Prime Minister.

The Communist Party boycotted the session and challenged the legitimacy of Ghimpu's election on procedural grounds on 1 September, but the Constitutional Court decided on September 8 that the election had been valid. Voronin had announced he would resign by 14 September 2009 and become a simple MP, which he did on 11 September 2009; this meant that Ghimpu took over as acting president until the election.

== Election ==
Moldova's parliament voted to elect a new president of the former Soviet republic on October 23 or 26, Marian Lupu said on October 5, 2009. The elections were to be held on October 23, but were postponed due to a constitutional dilemma over whether it is legal to hold them with only one candidate registered.

The first election attempt on November 10 failed, as the PCRM boycotted the election. Another round was to be held within thirty days. If the second attempt failed as well, with the expectation of further early elections in autumn of 2010. The second round was set for 7 December, and failed as well, with the same voting result.

== See also ==
- Moldovan presidential election, May–June 2009
- Acting president
