= 2009 Romanian parliamentary reform referendum =

22 November 2009

Do you agree to the transition to a unicameral Parliament in Romania?
Yes	77.78%
No	22.22%

Do you agree to the reduction of the number of members of parliament to a maximum of 300 persons?
Yes	88.84%
No	11.16%

A referendum on modifying the size and structure of the Parliament from the current bicameral one with 137 senators and 334 deputies to a unicameral one with a maximum of 300 seats was held in Romania on 22 November 2009, at the same time as the first round of the 2009 presidential election. Electors were asked two questions on two separate ballots:

1. Do you agree to the transition to a unicameral Parliament in Romania? (Romanian: Sunteți de acord cu trecerea la un Parlament unicameral în România?)
2. Do you agree to the reduction of the number of members of parliament to a maximum of 300 persons? (Romanian: Sunteți de acord cu reducererea numărului de parlamentari la maximum 300 de persoane?)

According to the Romanian law, in order for the referendum to be validated, 50% plus one of the total number of eligible voters (i.e. of the number of people that appear on the official electoral list) had to cast their vote. According to the final tally by the Romanian Central Electoral Commission, 9,320,240 of the 18,293,277 eligible voters participated, thus validating the referendum with a turnout rate of 50.95%.

== Background ==
Incumbent President Traian Băsescu signed the decree to hold this plebiscite on 22 October 2009. The previous day, on 21 October, the Romanian Parliament in a consultative vote recommended against the President's proposed referendum, but, according to Romanian referendum law, Parliament's resolution was not binding.

In response to the referendum call, the National Liberal Party, in opposition to incumbent Băsescu, introduced a bill which would downsize Parliament to a total of 316 representatives – 99 senators and 217 deputies. After counting more than 90% of the votes, the authorities announced partial results, including the information that 50.16% of the electorate expressed their votes making the result of the referendum valid.

== Results ==
Question 1
Choice	Votes	%
For	6,740,213	77.78
Against	1,925,209	22.22
Total	8,665,422	100.00
Valid votes	8,665,422	92.97
Invalid/blank votes	654,818	7.03
Total votes	9,320,240	100.00
Registered voters/turnout	18,293,277	50.95
Source: Biroul Electoral Central

Question 2
Choice	Votes	%
For	7,765,573	88.84
Against	975,252	11.16
Total	8,740,825	100.00
Valid votes	8,740,825	93.78
Invalid/blank votes	579,415	6.22
Total votes	9,320,240	100.00
Registered voters/turnout	18,293,277	50.95
Source: Biroul Electoral Central

== Aftermath ==
After the referendum, from 471, the number of parliamentarians kept growing in Romania, due to lack of any legal limitations. In July 2015, after almost 6 years since the referendum was held, the number of Romanian parliamentarians was 588. No other referendum on implementing the legislation has been held in Romania since this one. The only one and last referendum (invalidated) was in 2012 for impeaching the president.
