= Pârvu =

Pârvu is a given name and a surname. Notable people with the name include:

- Pârvu Cantacuzino (died 1769), leader of an anti-Ottoman rebellion
- Pârvu Mutu (1657–1735), Wallachian Romanian muralist and church painter
- Emanuel Pârvu (born 1979), Romanian actor and filmmaker
- Florian Pârvu (born 1991), Romanian professional footballer
- Florin Pârvu (born 1975), Romanian former football midfielder and current manager
- Ionel Pârvu (born 1970), former Romanian football player
- Lucian Pârvu (born 1982), Romanian former footballer

== See also ==
- Pârvu Roșu, a village near Costești, Argeș County, Muntenia, Romania
