= Vădeni, Brăila =

Vădeni
- Commune
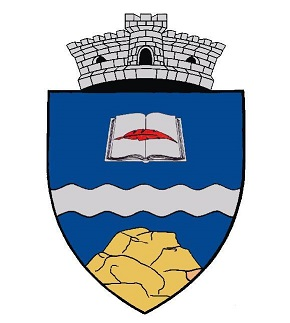
- Coat of arms

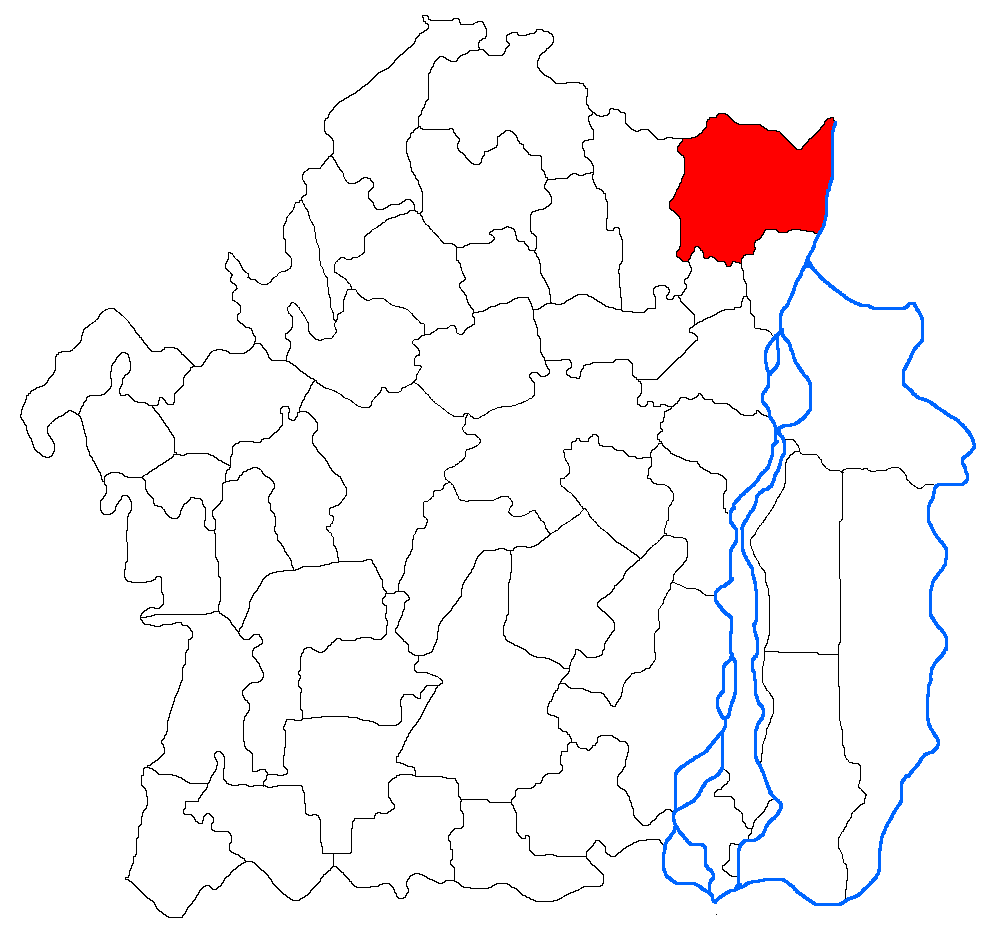
- Location in Brăila County

- Location in Romania
- Coordinates: 45°22′N 27°55′E
- Country: Romania
- County: Brăila
- Population (2021-12-01): 3,700
- Time zone: UTC+02:00 (EET)
  - Summer (DST): UTC+03:00 (EEST)
- Vehicle reg.: BR

Vădeni is a commune located in Brăila County, Muntenia, Romania. It is composed of three villages: Baldovinești, Pietroiu and Vădeni.

== Natives ==
- Gigi Becali
