= Christian Mititelu =

Romanian journalist

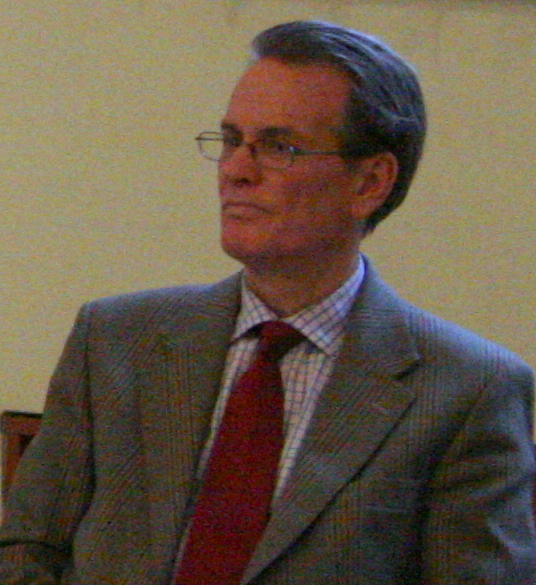
- Mititelu at a CNA meeting in 2009
- Born: 11 April 1944 (age 82); Bucharest, Romania
- Occupations: Journalist, public servant
- Employer(s): BBC; National Audiovisual Council of Romania
- Children: 2

Christian Gheorghe Mititelu (Romanian pronunciation: [kristiˈan ˈɡe̯orɡe mitiˈtelu]; born 11 April 1944) is a Romanian journalist. He was the director of the Romanian department of the BBC.

== Education and career ==
He attended Polytechnic University of Bucharest between 1962–1967. Then he worked as engineer for F.E.A. Bucharest (1968-1969) and G.E.C. Automation Paris (1970-1971).

From 1972 until 2008, he worked for BBC World Service, first as redactor (1972-1984) and then as director of Romanian section of BBC (1984-1991 and 1993-2004). Also, Christian Mititelu worked for the BBC until August 2008.

He is also the president of the Civic Alliance of Romania and a member of the Romanian Press League. Mititelu is a member of the National Audiovisual Council of Romania as well. He was appointed in this position by the Romanian Government in October 2008.

He is married and has two children.

== Honours ==
- (Romania) Romanian Royal Family: 57th Knight of the Royal Decoration of the Cross of the Romanian Royal House
