= 2009 Comorian constitutional referendum =

- 17 May 2009

Results
Choice	Votes	%
Yes	156,055	93.91%
No	10,124	6.09%
Valid votes	166,179	95.95%
Invalid or blank votes	7,017	4.05%
Total votes	173,196	100.00%
Registered voters/turnout	334,636	51.76%

A constitutional referendum was held in the Comoros on 17 May 2009. The constitutional amendments were approved with 93.9% in favour, with a turnout of 51.8%.

== Background ==
President Ahmed Abdallah Mohamed Sambi proposed extending his term for two years in order to hold all elections simultaneously in 2011, as well as to reform the constitutional structure of the Comoros to save money. However, opposition parties and those from other islands were opposed to this, seeing it as a ploy to extend his term of office at the expense of the other two islands. Other constitutional amendments would make Islam the state religion and downgrade the status of the presidents of the constituent islands to governors, as well as allowing the president to dissolve the Assembly of the Union.

The referendum was originally scheduled for 22 March 2009, but was postponed due to disagreements over the content.

== Results ==
Choice	Votes	%
For	156,055	93.91
Against	10,124	6.09
Invalid/blank votes	7,017	–
Total	173,196	100
Registered voters/turnout	334,636	51.76
Source: African Elections Database
