= Gigi Becali =

Romanian businessman and politician (born 1958)

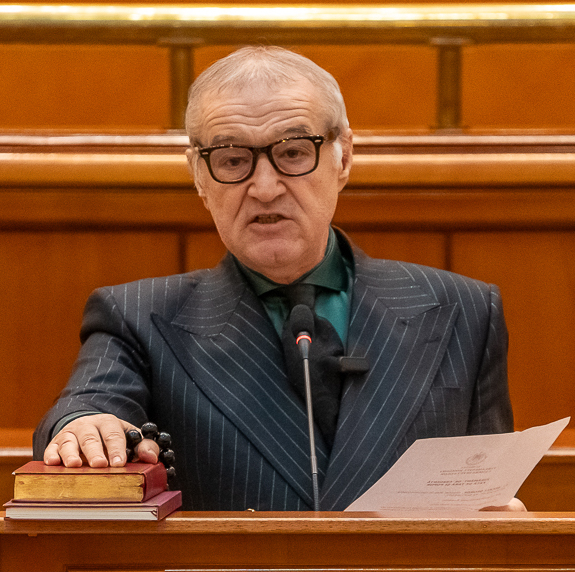
- Becali at the Chamber of Deputies in 2024.

Owner of FCSB
- Incumbent
- Assumed office 2003–2007 (President) / 2003–present (Owner)

Member of the Chamber of Deputies
- Incumbent
- Assumed office 20 December 2024
- In office 19 December 2012 – 20 May 2013
- Constituency: Bucharest

Member of the European Parliament for Romania
- In office 14 July 2009 – 8 January 2013

President of the New Generation Party
- In office January 2004 – April 2009
- Preceded by: Viorel Lis

Personal details
- Born: 25 June 1958 (age 68) Vădeni, Brăila County, Romania
- Citizenship: Romania; Greece
- Party: None (since 2025)
- Other political affiliations: New Generation – Christian Democrat Party (1999–2009); (2010–2012); Greater Romania Party (2009–2010); National Liberal Party (2012–2013); Alliance for the Union of Romanians (2024–2025)
- Spouse: Luminița Becali (m. 1994)
- Children: 3
- Education: "Iuliu Maniu" Technical College
- Occupation: Businessman, politician
- Religion: Romanian Orthodox
- Net worth: US$1.2 billion (2025)

George "Gigi" Becali (Romanian pronunciation: [ˈdʒe̯ordʒe beˈkali]; born 25 June 1958) is a Romanian businessman, writer, politician and former convict, mostly known for his ownership of the FCSB football club.

Becali was a Member of the European Parliament between June 2009 and December 2012, and a Member of the Romanian Parliament from December 2012 up until his conviction in May 2013. In 2024, Becali was elected a member of the Chamber of Deputies for the AUR party, but left in March 2025 due to chairman George Simion's decision of collected signatures for a female presidential candidate.

== Early life ==
Becali was born in Vădeni, Brăila County, to an Aromanian family which had been deported to the Bărăgan Plain by the Communist authorities because of their associations with the pre-World War II fascist party Iron Guard.

== Entrepreneurship ==
=== Real estate business and Army deals ===
Becali became a millionaire through various business exchanges with the Romanian Army, he used his position as an influential Pastoralist to provide the army with an abundance of dairy products and other goods and commodities, gaining large amounts of influence over the leadership in the shady commerce affairs that characterised post-communist Romania. The most notable of these dealings was a land swap with the army - dubbed by the Romanian press as suspicious, as the Army did not need the land it received and the land he received in exchange was worth much more.

The deal consisted of Becali giving the Army a 21.5-hectare plot in Ștefăneștii de Jos (about 15 km from Bucharest) in exchange for a 20.9-hectare plot in Băneasa-Pipera, in Northern Bucharest. As the real estate prices skyrocketed in the capital, he sold the land to some companies that built residential areas.

In 2007, it was revealed that in 1998, when Becali sent the offer to the Romanian Army, he was not the owner of the property in Ștefăneștii de Jos, buying it only after it was clear that the deal would be signed. Also, the Army was not legally allowed to give away the Pipera plot, because it was claimed by former owners.

The affair was investigated in 2006 by the National Anticorruption Directorate (NAD). In July 2007, the NAD started to investigate a transaction between Becali and the daughter of Defence Minister Victor Babiuc, involving land in Pipera which was sold for US$300 per square meter.

=== Ownership of FCSB ===
Becali joined the General Shareholders' Council of the Steaua București football club at the end of the 1990s, during the presidency of businessman Viorel Păunescu. Step by step, he tried to eliminate other possible candidates and gather all the club's shares. He obtained 51% of the shares on 6 February 2003 and he bought another 15% toward the end of the year 2003.

On 17 October 2005, his entire fortune was impounded by the National Fiscal Authority (ANAF) for debts totaling US$11,000,000. However, Becali sued the ANAF and won the case, and subsequently the order of seizure was lifted. He was however able to avoid paying the taxes by transferring the assets of Steaua to a newly formed company, AFC Steaua București, allowing the old association to go bankrupt. As of 2007, Becali detains no official link to the club, as he gradually renounced his shares in favour of his nephews.

In 2005, the papers wrote that he commissioned a painting inspired by Leonardo da Vinci's Last Supper, in which he holds the place of Jesus, while the eleven players and the coach hold the place of the disciples. Becali denied the story, claiming that he received the painting from an admirer.

=== Managing FCSB ===
Becali was often criticised for interfering with his managers' work, frequently calling for subs at half time or deciding on the starting XI. Becali admitted this as much, stating that the players are brought with his money, so it is his right to decide who plays and how. Since he was released from prison in 2015, Becali shifted towards appointing puppet managers, without experience, oftentimes close acquaintances or former FCSB icons such as Nicolae Dica, Mirel Radoi, Vergil Andronache, Dinu Todoran and Anton Petrea, oftentimes his main criteria being their religiousness or willingness to be "bossed around" by Becali. One encounter, told by Becali himself, was when Dinu Todoran was considered as manager for the second team. When Becali called him to inform him of the possibility of taking this job, Todoran replied to call him later, stating he is in church. Becali was deeply impressed by the piousness of Todoran that he immediately appointed him manager for the first team. Todoran himself admitted that Becali was managing the team for him, stating that it was no secret who decides the starting XI and the subs, which can be reflected by the fact that he was receiving the lowest salary of any manager in the Romanian League. After a bad spell of form and criticism from the media for his approach, Becali sacked Todoran and decided to not involve himself in football matters anymore, hiring Edward Iordanescu, the manager who won the previous title. Iordanescu immediately turned the team around, and achieved a 9-game undefeated streak, including a 6–0 win over bitter rivals Dinamo Bucharest, in spite of a COVID outbreak at the club. Becali remained silent for a few months, however he started to voice his displeasure at the quality of the game, stating that his team must always have the possession, and that a result based approach is not what interests him. Tensions arose at the club, and ultimately Edi and Becali parted ways on 14 November 2021, after winning eight games, drawing two and losing two and taking the team to second place. Becali announced his intention to return to the team, appointing Pintili as caretaker since he does not have a coaching badge.

=== Honours during his ownership of the football club ===
==== Domestic ====
- Liga I (7): 2004–05, 2005–06, 2012–13, 2013–14, 2014–15, 2023–24, 2024–25
- Cupa României (3): 2010–11, 2014–15, 2019–20
- Supercupa României (4): 2006, 2013, 2024, 2025
- Cupa Ligii (2): 2014–15, 2015–16

==== Continental ====
- UEFA Cup: 2004–05 (Round of 16)
- UEFA Cup: 2005–06 (Semi-finals)
- UEFA Champions League: 2006–07 (Group stage)
- UEFA Champions League: 2007–08 (Group stage)
- UEFA Europa League: 2012–13 (Round of 16)
- UEFA Champions League: 2013–14 (Group stage)
- UEFA Europa League: 2017–18 (Round of 32)
- UEFA Europa League: 2024–25 (Round of 16)

=== Other business activities ===
Becali announced in 2008 that he intends to open his own bank, named "Becali Bank", intended to be used "only by millionaires", with an initial investment of €30 million. Nevertheless, the Administration Council of the National Bank of Romania rejected the plan of creation without giving a public reason. Cotidianul notes that the National Bank can reject the creation of a new bank if they suspect that the new bank would not respect the laws or that they won't have solid and prudent investment policies.

In reply to this decision, Becali named Mugur Isărescu, the governor of the National Bank, "a buffoon, a frustrated and envious person" and announced that he intends to sue him.

== Political career ==
At the 2000 Romanian legislative election, Becali was a candidate of the "League of Italian Communities in Romania" for the seat in the Chamber of Deputies reserved for the Italian minority. He received 16,266 votes (0.15%) countrywide, of which 7,677 in Ilfov County. Nevertheless, he lost to Ileana Stana-Ionescu, who got only 2,943 votes in one constituency. Becali contested the results, but according to Romanian election law, for national minorities, it is not the total number of votes that matters; the individual who gains the largest percentage in one constituency wins the seat reserved for that national minority.

He has led the New Generation – Christian Democrat Party (PNG-CD) since January 2004, being its candidate in the 2004 presidential election, receiving 1.77% of votes cast (184,560 votes).

In his 2004 electoral campaign, Becali used clips of the movie Mihai Viteazul movie (directed by Sergiu Nicolaescu), whose main character was played by Amza Pellea. Amza's daughter, Oana Pellea, sued Becali for using Amza Pellea's image without permission and won 35,000 lei (about US$12,000) in damages.

He often had disputes with Corneliu Vadim Tudor, another extremist politician. These disputes, usually consisted of exchanges of insults between the two. He had another dispute with Prime Minister Călin Popescu-Tăriceanu whom he named a "cockroach-politician" and a "Very Important Papagal" (papagal means "parrot" in Romanian and is regarded as an insult).

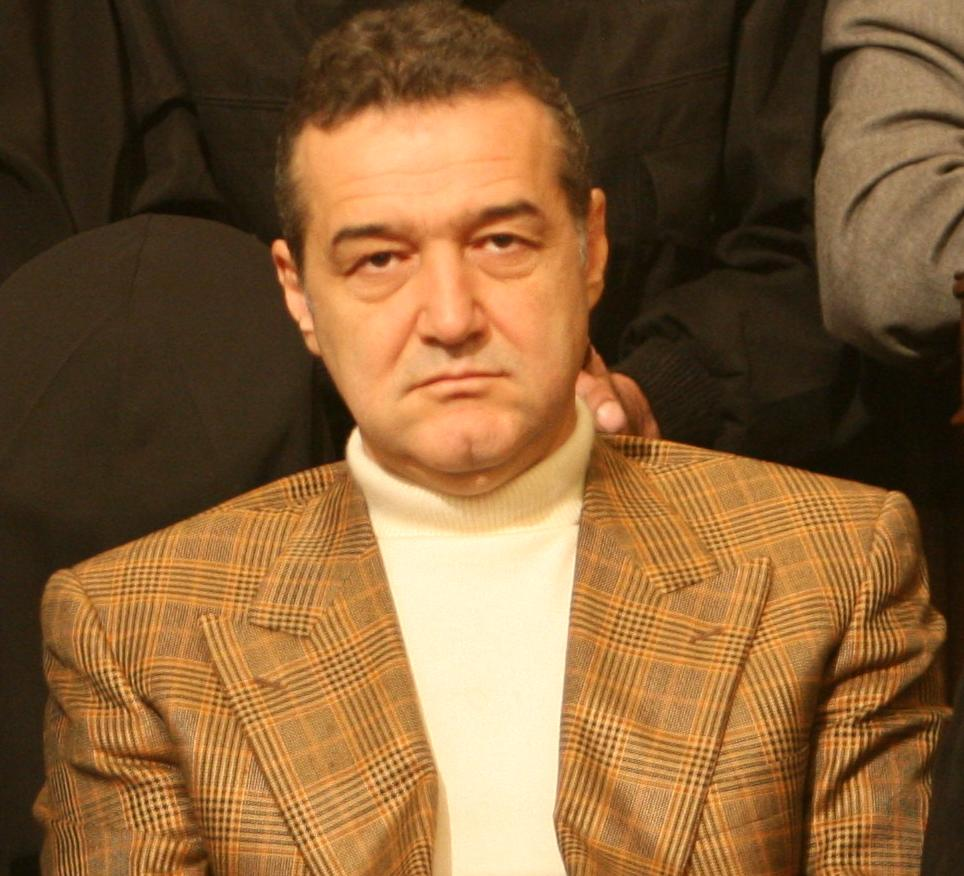
Becali at the Metropolitan Cathedral of Iași in 2006.

In December 2006, he promised that his party would generate a "Cultural revolution" in Romania.

At the elections for the European Parliament, held in November 2007, his party (PNG-CD) obtained 4.86% of the popular vote, just under the 5% needed for admission in the EU governing body. The same happened in the December 2008 elections, which came as a surprise to many people.

At the June 2009 European Parliament election, Becali ran on Vadim's Greater Romania Party (PRM) ticket and won a seat in the European Parliament. However, on 9 June, Romanian judges upheld a travel ban on Becali for the duration of an illegal incarceration investigation by police, banning him from taking his seat in the EP; Becali retorted that he intended to take his seat in Brussels and dared the justice system to arrest him in Belgium. Eventually, the Romanian supreme court lifted all restrictions on him.

He also ran in the 2009 presidential elections where he got 1.91% of the vote.

In 2012, he was selected as a candidate of the Social Liberal Union (USL) for a deputy mandate in Bucharest, Sector 6, at the National Liberal Party's (PNL) side. He negotiated the coalition of PNG-CD with PNL, but the majority of the liberals did not agree with this measure. On 19 October 2012, Becali joined PNL, with the support of the party president, Crin Antonescu. He won the election in the 25th uninominal college with 65% of the votes. Becali requested to be a member of the Judicial Commission of the Chamber of Deputies and received assurances that he will be appointed. He resigned from PNL after receiving penal condemnation. On 29 May 2013, the Chamber of Deputies decreed the end of Becali's term as a parliamentarian. In May 2024, news media reported on negotiations between Gigi Becali and AUR politician Mihail Neamțu to finance the latter's campaign for the 2024 European Parliament election in Romania.

In December 2024, Becali was elected a member of the Chamber of Deputies for the AUR party, but left on 14 March 2025 due to chairman George Simion's decision of collected signatures for a female presidential candidate Anamaria Gavrilă, stating:

I liked her [Gavrilă] at first appearance, on the first day at Parliament I even shook her hand because she seemed like a good woman, then, after her appearances, I realised that she is a very naughty woman, with an extraordinary audacity and impudence. A woman loses her femininity when she is like this

— Gigi Becali, 14 March 2025

Simion reacted by stating "We are in the Easter fast, it's good to be good Christians, to turn the other cheek". On 23 March, Becali claimed that Simion had called him to apologise, allegedly telling him "Uncle Gigi, forgive me, I was wrong".

== Electoral history ==
=== Mayor of Bucharest ===
Election	Affiliation	Main round		
Election	Affiliation	Votes	Percentage	Position
2012	PNG	25,076	3.19%	5th

=== Presidential elections ===
Election	Affiliation	First round			Second round		
Election	Affiliation	Votes	Percentage	Position	Votes	Percentage	Position
2004	PNG	184,560	1.8%	6th	not qualified		
2009	PNG	186,390	1.91%	7th	not qualified		

== Political positions ==
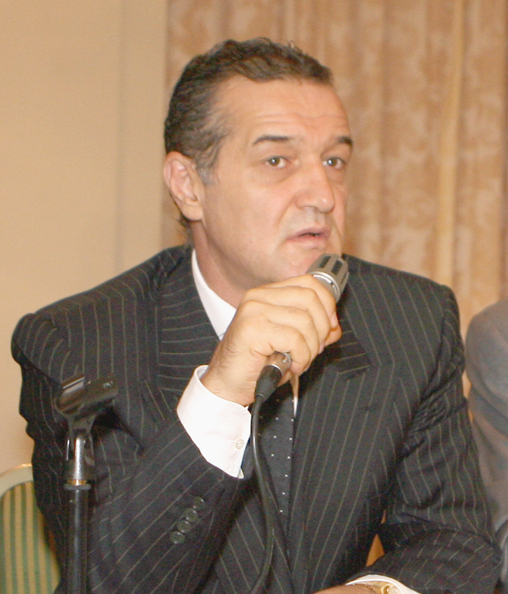
Becali in 2007.

His political views are nationalistic; he declared himself a follower of the Pre-World War II Romanian Legionnaire Movement and called for the canonisation of Corneliu Zelea Codreanu.

His 2004 electoral slogan "I, Gigi Becali, swear to all Romanians and to God that I'll make Romania shine like the holy sun of the sky" ("Eu Gigi Becali, jur în fața tuturor românilor și în fața lui Dumnezeu că voi face ca România să strălucească precum soarele sfânt de pe cer!") is taken from the testament of Ion Moța, one of the founders of the Iron Guard.

In 2005, Dan Pavel resigned from his job as Becali's adviser because of Becali's links with Noua Dreaptă, a neofascist organization. Pavel claims that a few months after, Becali gave up those links.

=== Raport with Băsescu and PDL ===
Becali and the party he was leading were previously allied with the Democratic Liberal Party (PDL) in Bucharest's local council. At that time, the PDL leaders announced they don't want a National Liberal (PNL) vice-mayor, but they would rather support one from Becali's party.

== Controversies ==
=== Views on homosexuality ===
In line with his conservative Orthodox Christian views, Becali has often made inflammatory remarks in the press regarding LGBT people. During his 2004 presidential campaign one of the main themes of his rhetoric was opposition to sexual minorities, which he voiced over and over in interviews and TV appearances.

On 26 May 2006, Becali's personal foundation, the "George Becali Christian Foundation", along with the Romanian Orthodox Church and 22 NGOs, signed a protest letter calling on the government and the courts to ban the Bucharest GayFest 2006 parade, focused that year on the theme of same-sex unions. A few days later, the Bucharest Court of Appeals ruled, however, that the parade was legal, and it was ensured significant police protection. Becali justified his opposition to the pride parade by stating that he "doesn't discriminate against homosexuals" but that, "They abuse their rights. This is proselytism. They can do what they want in their homes, but not on the streets. I call on the Romanian Orthodox Church to defend the Christian faith and morals". Becali declared that he intended to pay for a referendum on same-sex marriage, which he believed 99% of people would vote against. He was also widely criticized in the media for asking, "Why [are there] so many homosexuals? I'll give two or five million dollars [for a referendum], so we can finish off all homosexuals in the country".

The media commentator Dan Tapalagă, in an editorial at the Cotidianul newspaper, criticized the Romanian Orthodox Church for its coalition with Becali, and its opposition to the gay pride parade, which he sarcastically termed as "the sin of the Becalised Church".

In an opinion piece written after Becali's inflammatory declaration, journalist Radu Călin Cristea quoted Cristian Pârvulescu, a Romanian political analyst, who described Becali as a "populist who practices a superficial form of legionarism", referring to the fascist Iron Guard movement which took place in 1930s Romania and whose members were named "legionnaires" (legionari). Cristea also warned that society and the political class should stop regarding Becali as an "inoffensive and amusing clown".

In October 2006, Becali was awarded the LGBT community's "black ball" for the most homophobic personality in Romania, as part of the 2006 Gay Awards Gala which took place during the Gay Film Nights Festival of Cluj-Napoca.

During Bucharest's annual GayFest in June 2007, Becali seemed to have tempered his homophobic stance. He declared in an interview that "I love them [homosexuals] in the same way that I love all other people. They can marry at the City Hall, every day, 10 of them if they want to. But in church, they don't have a place". When questioned about homosexuality in another interview conducted during the 2007 GayFest, he stated, "They can do what they want... marry... I don't have anything against that". On the question of whether he would accept a gay person in the New Generation Party of which he is president, Becali replied "But why would I have a problem with that? Who knows how many there already are?"

In September 2007, he resumed his homophobic speech, stating that if he becomes president of Romania, he will "get rid of all homosexual and lesbian clubs" and create special neighbourhoods for homosexuals and lesbians, so that "they can stay there and leave us [alone]". He also referred to gays as "sinners" and said that "they should go to the priest if they have problems in their head". The secretary-general of the New Generation Party, Cătălin Dâncu, later appeared to distance himself from Becali's comments, declaring that, "As long as EU principles clearly state that minority rights must be respected, Romania as a member-state must respect them".

=== Legal action for discrimination against homosexuals ===
In 2010 Becali made public statements that Steaua would never employ a gay footballer. ACCEPT, a Romanian gay rights organisation, complained against Becali and Steaua to Romania's National Council for Combating Discrimination that these statements breached Romania's anti-discrimination and hate speech laws. The Council upheld the complaint against Becali. However, it imposed no fine because of a Romanian law that a fine cannot be imposed more than six months after the discriminatory act. The Council dismissed the complaint against Steaua because Becali is not an official spokesperson of the club. ACCEPT appealed the decision to the Bucharest Court of Appeal. The Court of Appeal has referred questions of European Union law to the Court of Justice of the European Union. The Court heard the case on 22 January 2012 and delivered its judgment on the 25th of April 2013, in which it found that homophobic statements regarding recruitment of football players made by a person who is perceived by the public as having a leading role in the football club can constitute direct discrimination on the basis of sexual orientation, which is prohibited by the Council Directive 2000/78 establishing a general framework for equal treatment in employment and occupation.

=== Xenophobia ===
Some of Becali's remarks have been considered xenophobic; for instance, in May 2008, the National Audiovisual Council fined the OTV channel for allowing Becali's "aggressive and xenophobic speech", which "instigated to hate against the Hungarian minority in Romania" to go on live, without any intervention from Dan Diaconescu, the talk show host. He also believes in a conspiracy of the "Hungarian Freemasons", claiming that it is they who are financing Steaua's adversary, CFR Cluj.

In November 2001, Becali and his bodyguards insulted and physically abused Malonga Parfait, the host of the satirical football TV show Fotbal la Maxx. Becali called Parfait a "monkey" allegedly because the latter is of African origin.

There have been numerous controversies with the violent declarations linked with the Steaua football team, including the use of slurs against the Romani and other minorities by fans and employees of Becali. He also sang in April 2005 a manea which included a racial slur against the Roma.

In 2012, Becali refused to sign French football player Florent Sinama Pongolle on the basis that he was black, even though Romanian football player Bănel Nicoliță, who played with him at the French club Saint-Etienne, said that the player was very talented.

=== Violence ===
In February 2002, Becali cursed and threatened Cristian Tudor Popescu, a well-known journalist, in a café, after the latter had written the article "O statuie pentru Puiu Pașcu" ("A Statue for Puiu Pașcu" – a former Minister of Defence in the Social Democratic Party cabinet of Adrian Năstase) in Adevărul about the controversial land swap with the Army and the assault on Malonga Parfait. Becali told Popescu that he should have been shot and that the journalists destroyed Romania.

In 2005, Becali provoked controversy by using extremely vulgar language in an interview, insulting the reporter and the channel he worked for (Antena 1).

In July 2005, in a restaurant, Becali cursed, spat and spilled a glass of wine on Șerban Huidu, the creator of the satirical TV show Cronica Cârcotașilor. Becali got the nickname "Ioan Botezătorul" (John the Baptist) after this incident.

Following a Steaua București match in April 2006, his bodyguards used violence against a female reporter of Realitatea TV after Becali asked them to "take her away from that place".

He currently is one of the favorite subjects of the Romanian media, due to his frequent slips of the tongue and inflammatory remarks. For example, in July 2005, a reporter called Becali to ask him some questions related to the Steaua București football club. Becali used this opportunity to unleash a flurry of curses addressed to Antena 1 and Dan Voiculescu. He himself said in the dialogue that "he is not a civilised man".

In 2008, he admitted that when he lost money in a casino, he lost his temper and began throwing chairs toward the windows, breaking them.

In April 2009 Becali was arrested over illegally holding 3 people against their will, because he suspected they were involved in stealing his car. He was arrested for a month, but he got out of jail after two weeks. Four other people, his bodyguards, Cătălin Zmărăndescu, Ștefan Dediu, Nicolae Dumitrașcu and Dumitru Beciual, who were also involved in the incident, were issued arrest warrants as well. Becali announced his candidacy for the European Parliament from his prison cell. Nick Thorpe, the BBC's correspondent to Romania, says that many Romanians see him as a victim of crime rather than a perpetrator, and that sympathy about the case undoubtedly helped Becali win a seat in Brussels for the nationalist Greater Romania Party. Romanian judges initially barred Becali from taking his MEP seat due to ongoing police investigation. Eventually, the Romanian Supreme Court lifted all bans and Becali was allowed to take his Brussels seat. Becali spent three weeks in jail during the investigation. In February 2013, Becali was given a suspended sentence of 3 years in jail for this case.

=== Misogyny ===
In September 2007, Becali sparked controversy when he insulted parliamentarian Lavinia Șandru, stating that she should "go and become a candidate for the ring road, not for the European Parliament", a veiled reference to prostitution. He has also remarked that a woman "has no more value" after she has given birth to a child. This led to a group of twenty-six women reporting Becali to the National Council for Combating Discrimination for contravening Romania's anti-discrimination laws. On 6 October, the Council ruled that Becali's comments were discriminatory towards women and "affected the dignity of women", with Becali being fined 500 lei.

=== Various ===
Becali has also been sued various times, mostly over slander, by the football coach Anghel Iordănescu, politician Radu Berceanu and a Divizia A referee, Cristian Balaj.

Becali has been an outspoken critic of COVID-19 restrictions and vaccinations, comparing vaccines to being "shot in the head". Despite claiming that he has not explicitly forbidden staff at FCSB from getting vaccinated, the low uptake of vaccines has led to large outbreaks of the virus within the squad, forcing the club to compete with only 13 senior players and no head coach in an October 2021 match.

== Conviction ==
George Becali was sentenced to three years in prison on 20 May 2013. According to the prosecutors, between 1996 and 1999, in the role of administrator of the state's public property land in the Voluntari area, the Ministry of National Defence performed two land swaps with George Becali. The total area of the two traded plots was 0.2889 square kilometers of land. This trade resulted in US$892,758 of damage to the Romanian state.

== See also ==
- List of corruption scandals in Romania

Business positions
Preceded by Viorel Păunescu	Owner of FCSB; 2003–present	Incumbent
