= Cristian Pîrvulescu =

Romanian political analyst (born 1965)

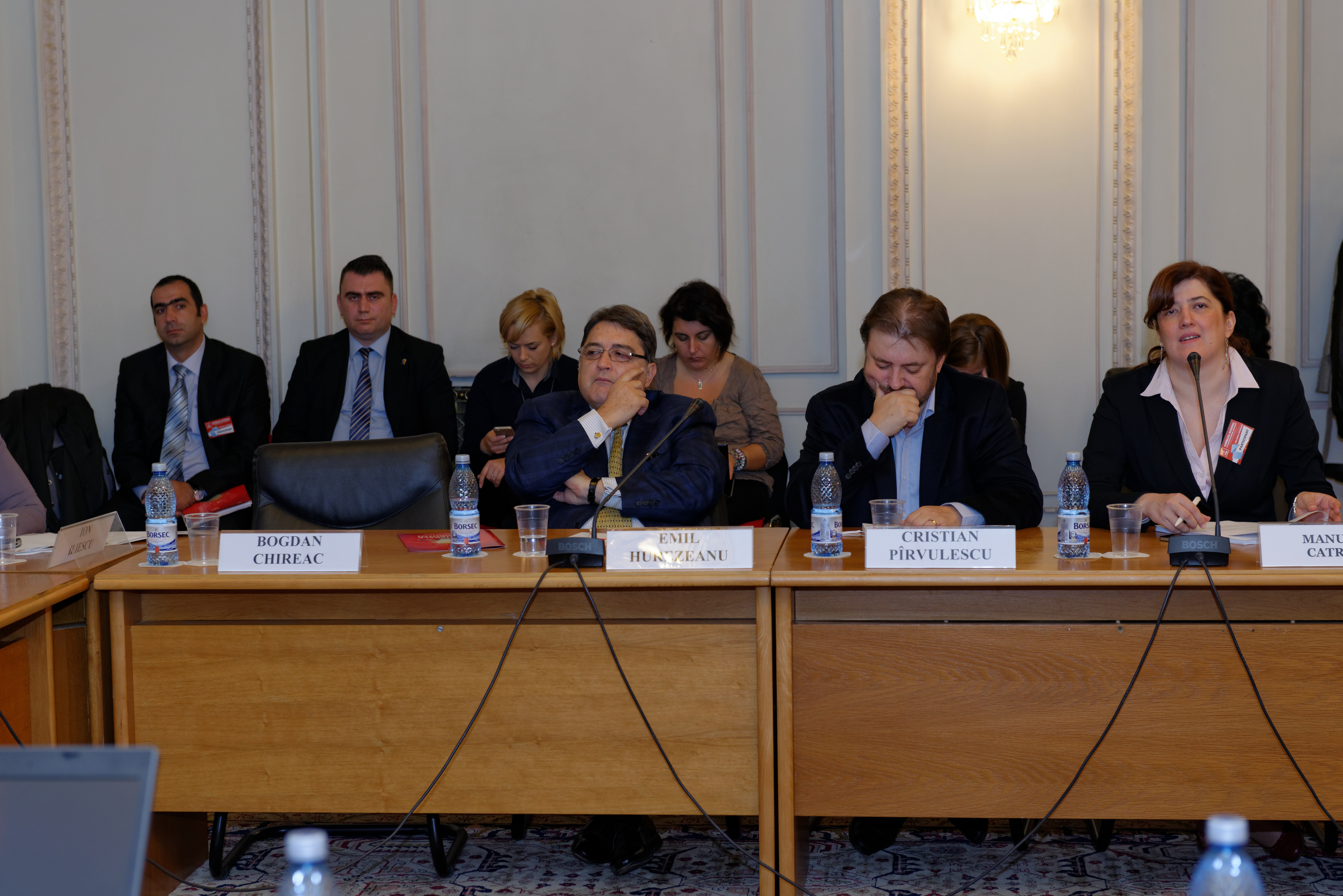
Cristian Pîrvulescu (in between Emil Hurezeanu and Manuela Catrina) in 2013

Cristian-Romulus Pîrvulescu (born 9 January 1965) is a Romanian political analyst, activist, journalist, and essayist. He is a professor at the National University of Political Studies and Public Administration (SNSPA) in Bucharest, and became its dean in December 2005.

Born in Ploiești, Pîrvulescu graduated in 1989 from the University of Bucharest's Faculty of Philosophy, and went on to finish his education at the Paris-based Institut d'Etudes Politiques and the Fondation Nationale des Sciences Politiques.

Pîrvulescu has been president of the Romanian NGO Pro Democrația since 1999, is a founding member of the Romanian Political Science Association, and counselor for the World Bank Comprehensive Development Frame Program.

He is a frequent editorialist, commentator and analyst in Romanian and foreign media including Curentul, Dilema Veche, BBC, Radio Free Europe, Romanian national television, Pro TV, Radio România Actualități, and Radio Romania International. Pîrvulescu was deputy editor of the monthly Sfera Politicii between 1994 and 1997. In 2000, he was awarded the National Order of Merit, Knight class.

== Political party science ==
His early career was centered on denouncing the negative consequences of the single-party communist regime that was present in Romania between 1948 and 1989, as well as of having major former second-rank Romanian Communist Party members continue holding important governmental posts (after the Communist era, the Romanian political party system was dominated by the National Salvation Front, perceived as a neo-communist party with a small faction of democrats and reformists).

Seen as a reformist and a leader in democratic thought, Pîrvulescu was, in the early 1990s, more and more often invited as a guest on political talk shows. What he saw as the failure of the Romanian Democratic Convention government (a centre-right coalition that governed Romania between 1996 and 2000) made him more critical of the Romanian political party system—in his view, mainstream Romanian parties were more interested in immediate electoral success than in making the whole political system and the whole country work better. He also denounced the consequences of the party-list electoral system in use in Romania, which, according to him, makes members of Parliament more dependent on party decisions, letting them stray away from their own political beliefs in favour of "political party discipline". Pîrvulescu attributed the apparent problems faced by the Parliament in adopting legislation to this phenomenon.

As of June 2025, Pîrvulescu was dean of the Faculty of Political Science at SNSPA.
