= May–June 2009 Moldovan presidential election =

2009 Moldovan presidential election
- 20 May 2009 (first round); 3 June 2009 (second round)
President before election
Vladimir Voronin
PCRM
Elected President
Election results annulled
Vladimir Voronin
(acting)
PCRM

An indirect presidential election was held in Moldova following the April 2009 parliamentary election.

== Overview ==
The incumbent president, Vladimir Voronin, was term-limited and was elected to become speaker of the Parliament of Moldova in early May 2009; the ruling Party of Communists of the Republic of Moldova (PCRM) nominated Zinaida Greceanîi. As the PCRM held only 60 of 101 seats in parliament, but 61 seats were required to elect the president, at least one dissenting vote from the opposition was required; the opposition had announced, however, that it would boycott the election, thus forcing repeated parliamentary elections.

In the first round on 20 May 2009, the opposition successfully boycotted the election procedure; a second round was set for 28 May 2009. On that day, the election was postponed to 3 June 2009; the PCRM claimed that it was due to Ascension Thursday falling that day, while the opposition criticised the PCRM's attempts to delay the election.

On 2 June 2009, the former parliamentary speaker Marian Lupu (who had been expected to become prime minister in a musical chairs-like shift of offices among Voronin, Greceanîi and Lupu) defected to the opposition, stating that he had realised that the PCRM was undemocratic and could not be reformed from within. As had been expected, the second round of the presidential elections was also unsuccessful, leading to early parliamentary elections held on 29 July 2009.

In both rounds, alternative candidates were also nominated by the PCRM – Stanislav Groppa, a doctor, in the first round; and Andrei Neguţa, the Moldovan ambassador to Russia, in the second round.

== Results ==
| Candidate | Party | First round | | Second round | |
| Candidate | Party | Votes | % | Votes | % |
|---|---|---|---|---|---|
| Zinaida Greceanîi | Party of Communists of the Republic of Moldova | 60 | 100.00 | 60 | 100.00 |
| Stanislav Groppa | Party of Communists of the Republic of Moldova | 0 | 0.00 | | |
| Andrei Neguţa | Party of Communists of the Republic of Moldova | | | 0 | 0.00 |
| Total | | 60 | 100.00 | 60 | 100.00 |
| Registered voters/turnout | | 101 | – | 101 | – |
Source: eDemocracy
