= Tele7ABC =

Defunct Romanian television channel

- 1998 logo
- Type: Television broadcaster
- Country: Romania
- Broadcast area: Romania
- Headquarters: Calea Victoriei 155, Bucharest (first); Giulești, Bucharest (last)

Programming
- Language: Romanian

Ownership
- Owner: Mihai Cârciog Company (first); Robinson Group (last)

History
- Launched: 14 August 1994; 31 years ago
- Founder: Mihai Tatulici
- Closed: April 2005; 21 years ago

Availability

Terrestrial
- Bucharest: Channel 42

Tele7ABC (Romanian pronunciation: [ˌtele ˈʃapte ˌabeˈtʃe]) was a television station in Romania, popular in the mid-1990s. One of the country's first three privately owned networks, it was launched in August 1994 by Mihai Tatulici and other defectors from the state-owned TVR network, with assistance from a group of investors. Though offering substantial pay to its on-air talents, it had a reduced budget for technical matters, and as such was always at risk at being surpassed by other commercial channels. Many of its prime time series were syndicated American shows filmed in previous decades, when Romania was under communism. In its first four years, Tele7 earned most of its dedicated viewership with talk shows (including one hosted by Tatulici until his departure in 1995), investigative journalism, and breakfast shows. Its staff at that time featured many young entertainers and journalists who became household names in Romania, such as Mihaela Rădulescu, Teo Trandafir, and Mircea Badea.

Tele7's editorial stance was initially anti-communist, including by openly discussing crimes committed by the Securitate agency and the latter's alleged continuity with post-communist intelligence. This course was maintained for three more years after Tatulici's departure; during that interval, the station also lost viewers and employees to the rapidly expanding Pro TV. It fought off this pressure by increasing its entertainment package and pioneering infotainment formats that its rivals arguably copied. Its most recognized hosts of the period included Tudor Barbu, Radu Coșarcă, Gabriel Cotabiță, Gabriela Cristea, and Cornel Todea, in addition to Badea and Trandafir. These figures ended their contracts around 1998, as Tele7 was entering a deep financial crisis.

The first revival attempt came in August 1998, when Aristide Buhoiu took over as director of programming. Under his watch, Tele7 became a venue for communist nostalgia and the national-communist synthesis, for instance by consulting Securitate general Nicolae Pleșiță about his political views. By many accounts, the station was experiencing a massive decline in quality and experimenting with controversial practices (including native advertising and a focus on the paranormal), losing much of its traditional audience. As part of his revival strategy, Buhoiu launched Dan Diaconescu into the journalistic mainstream, with sensationalist scoops—including claims about the sex life of the then-President of Romania, Emil Constantinescu; as result, the station found itself monitored by the National Audiovisual Council.

In 2000–2001, after Buhoiu's sacking, the station was largely associated with Diaconescu and national-communist poet Adrian Păunescu, the latter of whom hosted a nighttime show that critics described as abysmal. As part of a debt restructuring, Tele7 was taken over by Israeli businessman Freddy Robinson. Diaconescu went off the air due to his many legal problems, while Păunescu took his format elsewhere; the station also lost its only remaining hit, a variety show headlined by Cătălin Crișan. Robinson worked instead with Florin Călinescu, a consecrated television star, who was given editorial control in December 2001. The infusion of money and new talent failed to win back the public, and the station itself faded into obscurity. In its final two years, Tele7 was primarily noted for its failure to pay wages to its remaining staff, as well as for always being in danger of losing its broadcast license. It stopped airing in April 2005, after filing for bankruptcy.

== Creation ==
Sometimes referred to as the first Romanian private television, Tele7 was in fact preceded by the ephemeral SOTI TV (1992) and the more enduring Antena 1 (1993). Its history began in April 1994, when journalist Mihai Tatulici staged a walkout from the state-owned broadcaster, TVR, accusing his employer of censoring the news; Tatulici was followed by some 40 of his TVR colleagues, including editorial staff, regular journalists, and camera operators. Joining them was Radu Coșarcă, who had to first resign his position at the National Audiovisual Council (CNA), a regulatory agency. The new project was nominally owned by Mihai Cârciog Company, with production credits going to Cardinal Multimedia Production Company—itself owned by rock impresario Marcel Avram and journalist Paul Opriș. They promised the defectors a significantly higher pay (said to be four times what they made at TVR) and complete freedom of expression.

Initially, Tele7's offices and studios occupied two floors of a building on Calea Victoriei, No 155. During 1994, Tele7 announced that it would initially be accessible to viewers in Bucharest and Timișoara—a soft launch that preceded its national debut. Its first pilot (and satellite) broadcast was on 16 June, just before the 1994 FIFA World Cup, with a documentary on how Tele7 was being created, as well as with the pop tune Să fii cel mai bun, which it had successfully imposed as an official anthem of the national football squad. The signal was beamed across the Atlantic through Cheia transmitter and Eutelsat I F-5. Formal establishment was delayed to 14 August, by which time viewers were already skeptical that it would ever be launched. Tatulici and Coșarcă emphasized interactivity, offering prizes to their viewers—including a videocassette recorder, presented to a father whose child was born on that same day. A "baptism" of the new venture was held on 16 September with a cocktail party, hosted by Tatulici at the Palace of the Parliament.

Tele7's core news program, or Telejurnal, was mainly anchored by Coșarcă and Anca Toader, with Lucian Mîndruță and Laura Luca replacing them on weekends or during unexpected absences; Mîndruță was also news editor for the entire program. The station's first-ever grid included old TV series such as Little House on the Prairie and Star Trek: The Original Series. Early original-programming features were: a breakfast show by Liliana Munteanu, Tatulici's own evening talk show (Chestiunea Zilei), and a Sunday set of comedic "political dialogues", starring Viorel Gaiță. The latter generated irritation among the general public by pranking or otherwise embarrassing his interviewees, including the writer Ana Blandiana. Gaiță later switched to another formula, which tested the general-knowledge deficiencies of regular men and women, and which he had invented during his earlier period at TVR.

Tele7 was still under technical restrictions: like TVR, it relied on U-matic, a type of analog recording that was already seen as antiquated. In its first months, only Bucharest viewers could be sure to receive its broadcasts, through the 42nd slot on their TV sets. The channel was ultimately not available in Timișoara, where only select shows were taped and syndicated by the local channel, called TVT '89, which was initially controlled by Cârciog and Opriș. The same solution was adopted at Iași, where Tele7's programming was aired by a local contractor with a full day's delay. While TVR's stations were supplied by a mandatory television licence, Tele7 pursued economic and editorial independence through commercial spots, which were still relatively unfamiliar to Romanians in the early 1990s. It eased these in by copying Silvio Berlusconi's Mediaset, which apologized before every commercial break; the concept was then borrowed by TVR, when it too began airing commercials. On Easter 1995, Tele7 also hosted paid-for religious content of Eastern Orthodox inspiration, but of uncertain provenance.

Some nine months into its existence, Tele7 was available on cable television packages, but, as reported by Bogdan Ghiu (a TV consumer and critic at Dilema), its transmission was hampered by static. Along with Antena 1, it was also said to be pressuring providers into paying them royalties, "for which there is no legal basis." In April 1995, the CNA stepped in to prevent any cable company from getting more than 20% of its products from any one station; this move was meant to strike at Tele7 and Antena 1's looming duopoly, protecting TVR interests. By February 1996, 30% of the Romanian population received Tele7, which was encoded using a PAL standard. In June 1996, the introduction of stricter copyright regulations was applauded by Tele7's managers, since the station was now entitled to a share of its distributors' profits.

== As an anti-communist channel ==
Tele7's initial manager was Tatulici. In this capacity, he launched the careers of several figures who endured in the Romanian media landscape: Mircea Badea, Vlad Petreanu, Mihaela Rădulescu, and Teo Trandafir. Trandafir and Badea became household names after taking over and co-hosting the breakfast show, styled as Bună dimineața, România. Rădulescu was initially assigned to host Nocturnă pe 16 mm, introducing art films and being hailed by film critic Irina Margareta Nistor for her physical presence, "our very own Sydne Rome". Another successful formula was an edutainment show hosted and produced by scholar George Pruteanu for 180 episodes. By November 1994, Tele7 had a children's morning slot, centered on the Tiny Toon Adventures. In December, it announced that it had purchased rights to seven prime time classics, which had never aired in Romania from the time of their production: The A-Team, Dynasty, The F.B.I., Falcon Crest, Knight Rider, Kung Fu, and Miami Vice; in addition, it aired a more contemporary sitcom, The Fresh Prince of Bel-Air. Its first New Years' program scored a victory against TVR by recruiting two of its main stars, comedians Stela Popescu and Alexandru Arșinel. From 1995, Tele7 produced a horoscope, handled by Simona Vărzaru, or "Urania".

In its political content, Tele7 drew attention with its Reporter Tele7 segment, initially handled by Radu Nicolau. Its original focus was on agrarian issues ("the peasants' desperate situation"), with on-site coverage by Dan Pleșa. Also then, the station looked into the legacy of the communist regime, in particular by tackling issues related to its secret police, the Securitate, and the role of former agents in shaping public discourse during the 1990s. Writer Mariana Sipoș was briefly associated with Tatulici's venture, which, in November 1994, hosted her interview with the self-exiled Paul Goma—noted as the first instance in which regular Romanians could see Goma and hear his thoughts on politics. In February 1995, Chestiunea Zilei segment was guest-hosted by Cornel Nistorescu, who interviewed two former Securitate colonels, over several episodes. As argued by media analyst Tia Șerbanescu, this edition offered insight into the corps' rationalizations and historical revisionism, but also showed them struggling not to answer any direct questions posed by Securitate victims. The officers' description of the anti-communist guerrillas as "bandits" was shrugged off by a former guerrilla organizer, Ion Gavrilă Ogoranu, who noted that all partisans had been maligned as "bandits" by their direct enemies.

By March 1995, Tele7 had broken the "Captain Soare" story, which seemed to suggest that the Romanian Intelligence Service (SRI) was carrying on for the Securitate in monitoring right-wing intellectuals such as Horia-Roman Patapievici. It gave ample exposure to Patapievici's claims regarding the affair, while also hosting rebuttals by the SRI spokesman, Nicolae Ulieru, who speculated that the entire case was being staged by Patapievici's allies. In May, during another Chestiunea Zilei edition, the repentant communist writer, Octavian Paler, agreed to discuss his views on Romania's "national destiny". Paler's interview was interrupted by a phone call from the TVR's own Emanuel Valeriu, who saw anti-communism as too radicalized; as part of his intervention, he asked "where [Paler] would have even been without 23 August". Also then, Chestiunea Zilei, temporarily hosted by Carmen Bendovschi, tackled issues pertaining to the minorities of Romania, at a time when Romania, a candidate to EU enlargement, had agreed to follow guidelines set by the PACE. Bendovschi's guest was a human-rights activist, Gabriel Andreescu, who made divisive claims—including that Islamists in France had more political rights than Hungarians in Romania.

Overall, Tele7 was also mildly critical of to the then-governing Party of Social Democracy. An analysis from December 1995 showed that, although the Văcăroiu Cabinet and its governing coalition enjoyed most coverage on all Romanian channels, their lead on Tele7 was the weakest, with just 20% of the overall airtime; similarly, its Telejurnal was never pro-government. Despite acknowledging this bias, most people interviewed for a 1996 poll regarded the TVR's competing Actualități as the most trusted news source. At the time, 33% of the Telejurnal was made up of human-interest stories, which was significantly more than the 20% aired on Actualități, though the two rival stations ran about the same number of economic stories.

Opinions were divided regarding the scope and sincerity of such market positioning. In a July 1995 overview, academic Mioara Caragea commented on Tele7 as "the reservation for a dissident intelligentsia [and] fluffy rebellious souls", contrasting with TVR (home of the "working masses", entertained by optimistic news and lowbrow music) and Antena 1 (which aired mostly "narcotic" films appealing to the older generations); in Caragea's view, all three stations functioned as part of a conglomerate ultimately serving the SRI and the Social Democrats. In 2013, essayist Mircea Vasilescu contrarily observed that Tele7 had been rendered genuinely popular with its "alternative" content, allowing for opinions and "faces" that could not generally be shown on TVR. According to Vasilescu, this editorial policy helped inaugurate a "golden era of the talk show".

Original team
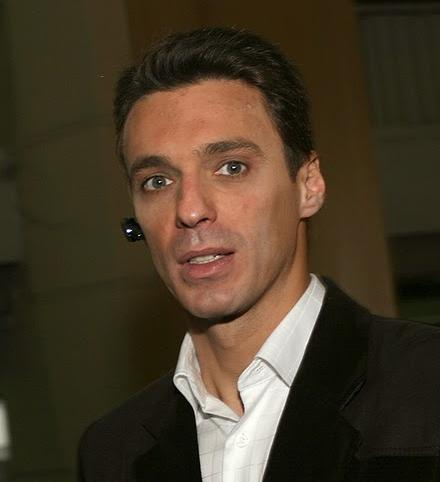
Mircea Badea in 2008

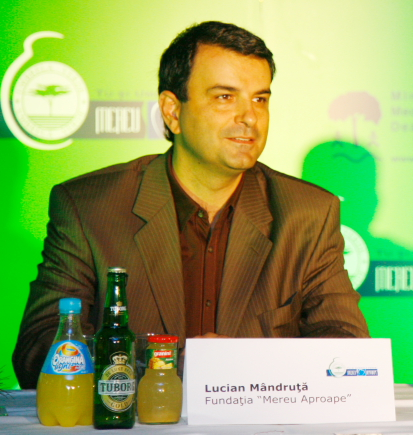
Lucian Mîndruță in 2007

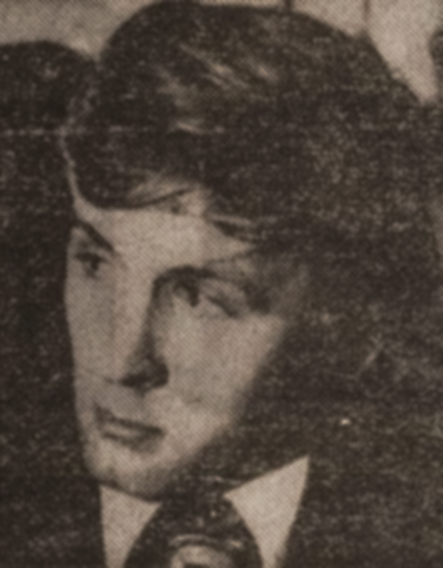
Cornel Nistorescu c. 1982

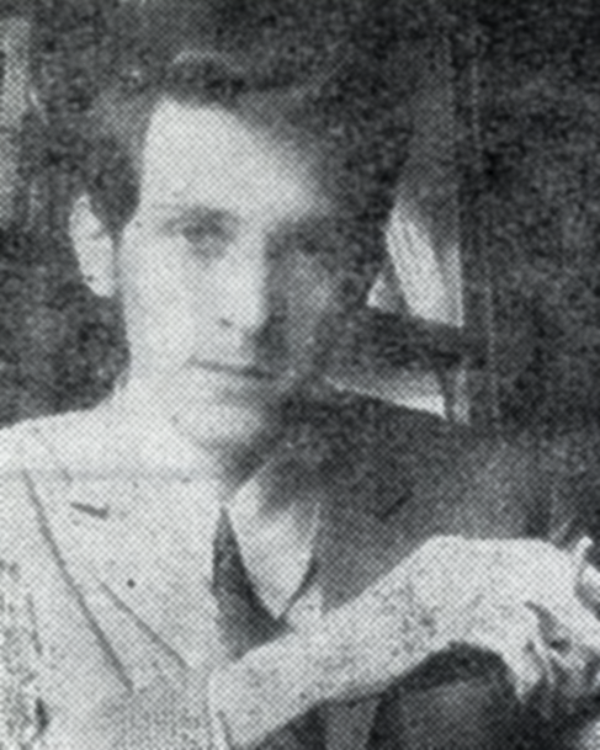
George Pruteanu in 1972

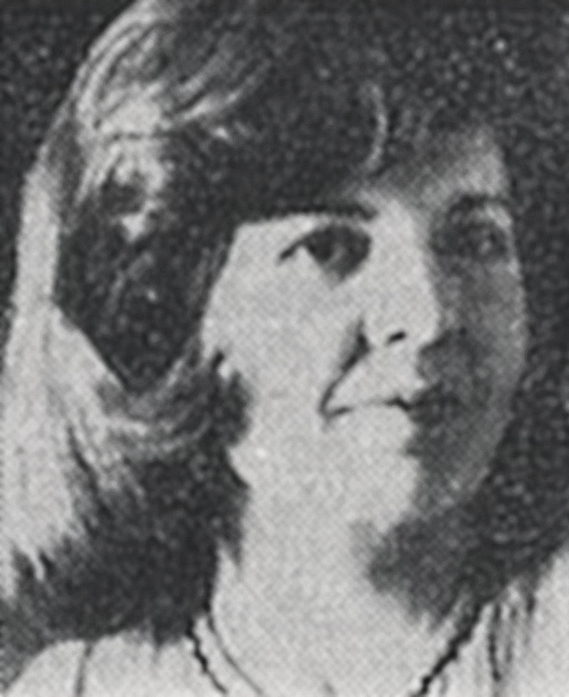
Mariana Sipoș in 1981

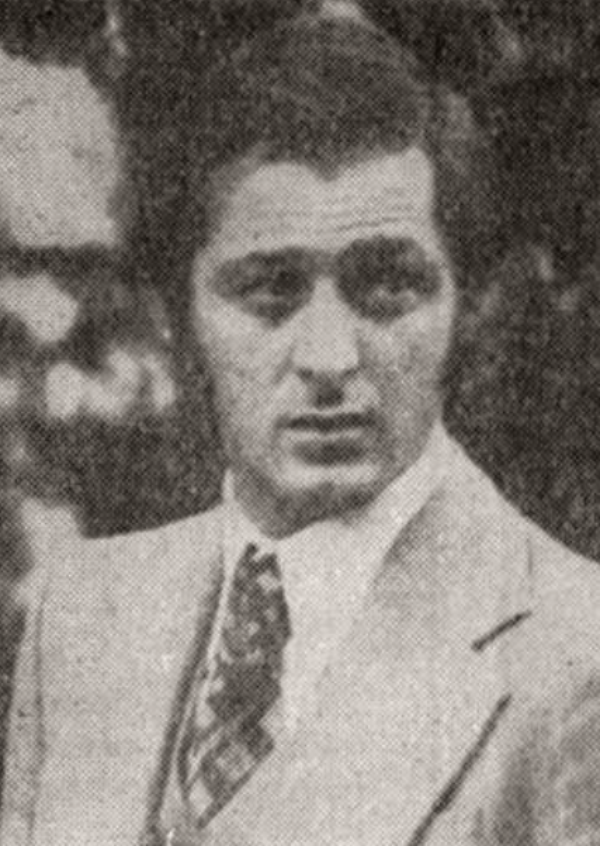
Mihai Tatulici in 1978

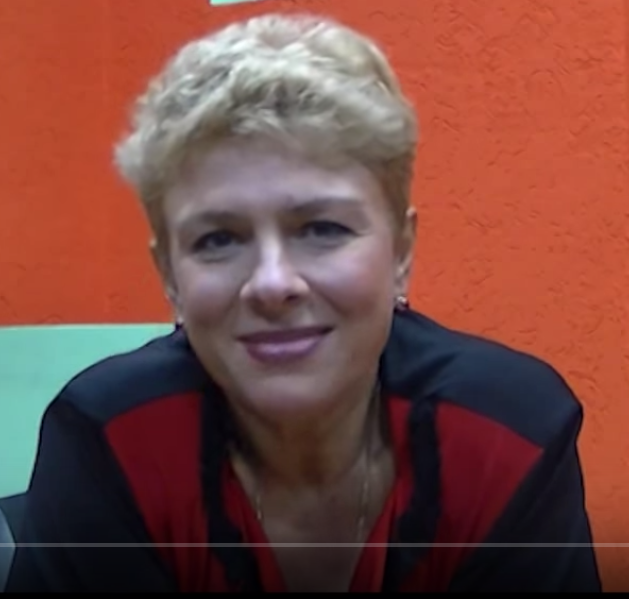
Teo Trandafir in 2012

== Rivalry with Pro TV ==
In early 1995, Tele7 was administered by Opriș through the holding RomSat, which also controlled Radio 2M+. Tatulici managed both of the latter, but was forced to resign in April, after a protracted conflict with the majority shareholders, and despite reconciliation attempts led by Avram. In late 1995, the market was revolutionized by a new private broadcaster, Pro TV, which immediately recruited among Tele7's technical staff. One of those who defected at the time recalled that Pro TV's equipment was vastly superior to anything used by RomSat. This inadequacy was also exposed by Tatulici, who further claimed that Opriș had purchased inferior computers, and that footage of "immense value" had been lost due to cassettes being insufficient, and therefore having to be taped over. In the provinces, the two emerging rivals were still regarded as similar, and equally desirable, in their clash with the national network. As critic Val Condurache noted in March 1996:

Both Pro TV and Tele 7abc speak not just different politics as compared with TVR 1, but a different language altogether. The images are not broadcast into our homes from the same place, but from another world, one accessible only to a few chosen people. Life as probed by the private television stations is not something out of some office, not something created in a laboratory for human guinea-pigs.

For a while, Tele7 was able to maintain its public, and made its own series of innovations. In September 1995, it was breaking ground in football coverage, obtaining exclusive broadcasting rights to Steaua matches. The club took in a reported 11,000 USD per broadcast. Shortly before Pro TV had entered the scene, Tele7 was registering success with its music programming. Pop singer Gabriel Cotabiță was co-opted as a producer of musical shows, later transitioning into a station presenter. In January 1995, the company established own series of live performances, the 7ABC Musical, with a concert at Sala Palatului; guests ranged from pop performers such as Laura Stoica and Mariana Țurcanu to Cargo, a hard rock band. Tele7 ran syndicated segments by VIVA Germany, but Cotabiță also encouraged original content. The station's Cătălin Cățoiu took top honors in the music video category at Golden Stag 1995. By November the Galas were being hosted at Ion Creangă Theater, and focused on alternative rock acts such as ZOB and Vița de Vie. These events were tinged by controversy after revelations about a sponsor, Sergiu Băhăian, who had fled the country to escape prosecution for large-scale fraud; reportedly, Tele7's news department refrained from even covering Băhăian's criminal case.

In January 1996, Tele7 staged a retrial of Romania's last communist leader, Nicolae Ceaușescu, who had been deposed and the summarily executed in the December 1989 Revolution. The affair was hosted by Corneliu Turianu, noted as a critic of the post-revolutionary justice system. Also involved was a "12-member 'jury' that will decide the case — but his number was immediately reduced to 11 because [one of the appointees] was accused by another participant of having shot at the revolutionaries in December 1989." Arriving in from 2M+ in late 1995, Adelin Petrișor had his beginnings as a war-zone reporter with Tele7. By his account, he obtained financing from Opriș to shoot "some very fine footage" of the South Lebanon conflict. Also then, the senior comedian Dem Rădulescu was hosted by Tele7 with a one-man satirical show called Musca ("The Fly"). It was almost immediately after purchased by Pro TV, but the deal was ended abruptly in early 1996. As explained by Rădulescu himself, he had lost the contract due to malicious rumors that he had joined a political party which Pro TV could not endorse (named elsewhere as Petre Roman's Democratic Party). After this incident, Rădulescu returned with Musca at Opriș and Avram's station.

On 13 December 1995, Cârciog announced that he was selling Cardinal's shares in RomSat, since Avram had presented himself as head of Tele7 during a dispute with Pro TV. After Tatulici had left, editorial matters were handled for a while by Nicolau. Early in his tenure, the station lost Mîndruță, who resigned to take up employment at Pro TV. The departure was on unfriendly terms, with his former bosses accusing him of being "an ingrate". In January 1996, Nicolau and Dana Deac (who had replaced Mîndruță as head of news) had a publicized conflict with Tudor Artenie, one of the contributors to news reporting. As he left Tele7, Artenie accused Nicolau of having stopped his series on corruption at the Ministry of Internal Affairs, and Deac of plagiarism at Reporter Tele7. That show came under critical scrutiny for exposing a case of child sexual abuse in Galați, but only as a means of mentioning that the rapist's uncle was a local businessman. Deac and her colleague Dan Badea presented their reportage works in a special selection at the 1996 festival in Costinești. Reviewer Călin Căliman described both contributions as noteworthy, but also criticized their veering into opinionated commentary or sensationalism.

Tele7 could recruit Gabriela Cristea, who co-hosted the breakfast programming, before becoming presenter of the Musical Galas. A regular variety show, Rendez-vous la Tele 7, was added to the Saturday schedule. Presented by Mirela Dobre and Șerban Diaconescu, it received negative reviews, in particular for kitsch or risqué acts that included a belly dance. The station reportedly came up with very successful political entertainment shows, the first of which were staged ahead of local elections in June 1996—in this initial phase, Cotabiță was the presenter, and the live transmission was out of Herăstrău. Deac was adding to the format: her investigative journalism took her into town halls, where she documented acts of bribery and even obtained on-camera confessions.

Nicolau-era arrivals
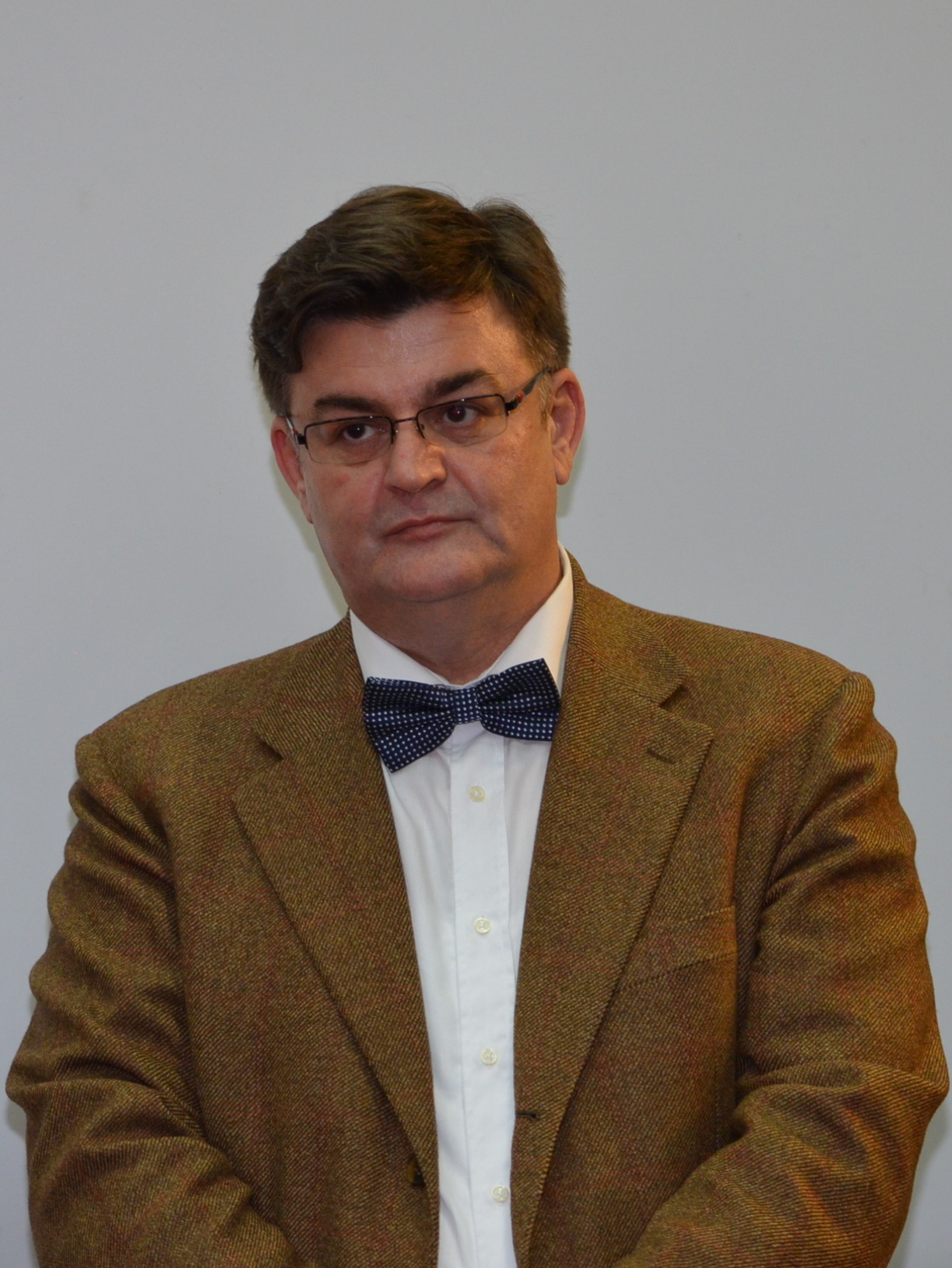
Tudor Artenie in 2013

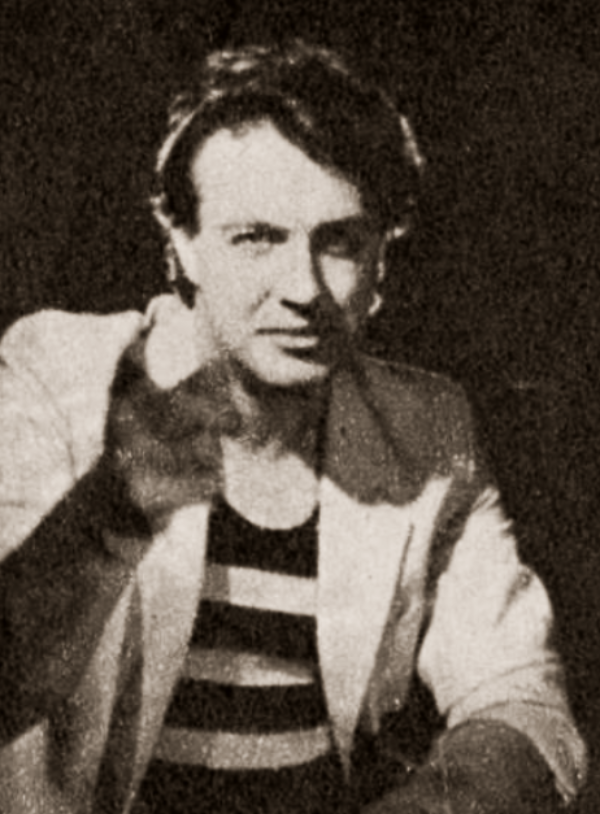
Gabriel Cotabiță in 1988

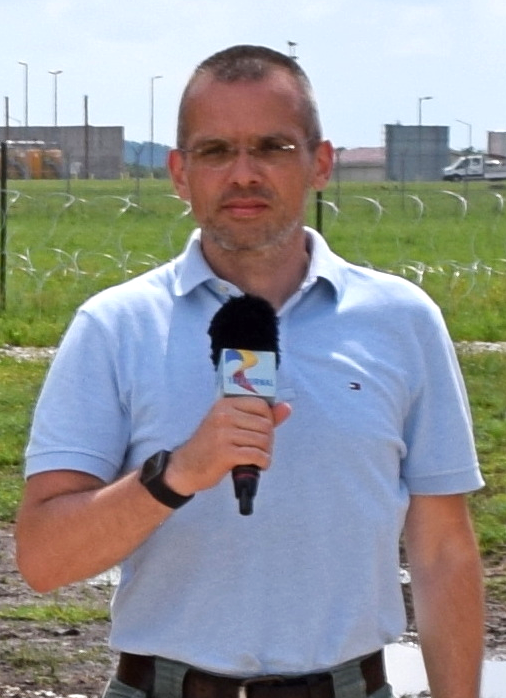
Adelin Petrișor in 2019

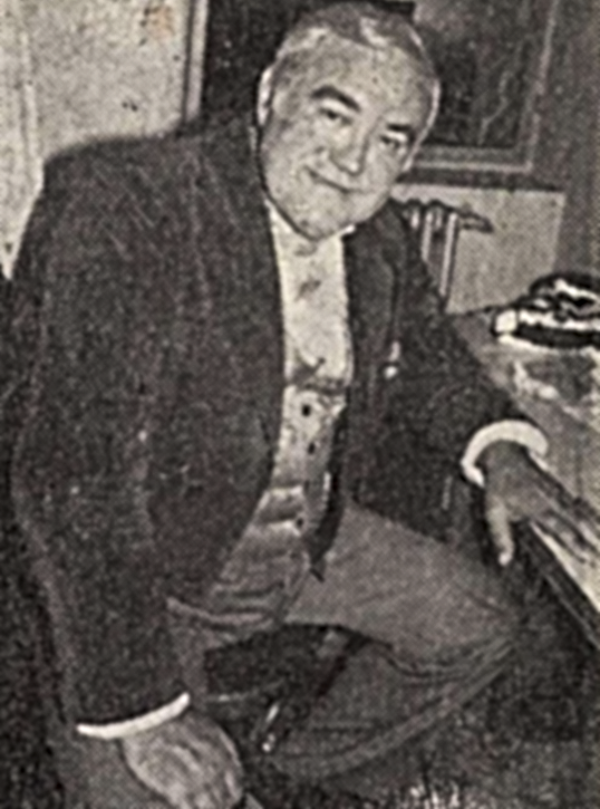
Dem Rădulescu in 1988

== Mafalda years and Buhoiu's arrival ==
In September 1996, just ahead of the general election, Tatulici signed a contract with ProTV, creating its political-themed broadcasts. As argued at the time by Ghiu, Tele 7 was able to outdo its former boss, producing shows on a similar format that Pro TV merely copied. The programming influence extended into other areas, when Pro TV was able to win over both Pruteanu and Gaiță. Tele7 was given exclusivity in covering Michael Jackson's HIStory World Tour on its Bucharest leg (arranged by Avram himself, also in September 1996), but, according to reports in other media, struggled to maintain interest in Jackson's music. As part of its publicity campaign, it offered 10 million lei to the finder of a banknote bearing Jackson's signature. Increasingly controlled by Avram during that stage of its history, Tele7 experienced a major downturn when its patron came under financial and legal pressures. A sign of its financial woes was read in its decision to air a programming block that included 1966's Mission: Impossible.

Just ahead of the election, Tele7's owners were able to expand territorial coverage after purchasing the Europa Nova network from Iosif Constantin Drăgan. Since the latter had encouraged nationalist-themed broadcasting, his sale to a moderate venue was regarded as a betrayal by others in that camp, including Corneliu Vadim Tudor of the Greater Romania Party. Tele7's own electoral coverage became controversial in late October, when the CNA stepped in to end its live coverage of a rally held by the right-wing Democratic Convention (CDR). Opriș and his staff defended the broadcast as a matter of public interest, within a series of equal-opportunity shows for all camps; in the right-wing România Liberă paper, the CNA was itself accused of acting as a hack for the governing Social Democrats.

The station, which entered the satellite package on 2 December 1996, maintained an independent editorial line during the CDR-led cabinets of 1996–2000. In March 1997, polls revealed that Tele7 and Antena 1 were engaged in a battle for the third most-watched Romanian station, with 10% of the public shared between them; the rest went to TVR and Pro TV, both of which had full national coverage. Coșarcă had meanwhile replaced Nicolau as the overall station head. In this capacity, he brought in a head reporter, Tudor Barbu, who had quit TVR after conflicts with that station's CDR-appointed news editor, Alina Mungiu. In March, critic Adrian Bucurescu saluted Barbu as a consummate professional, praising his coverage of a return visit by Romania's pre-communist King, Michael I. From January of that year, the programming director and chief talk-show had been Dan Andronic, though he left months later to establish his own station, Prima TV. New series aired by Tele7 included MacGyver, premiering in April 1997, which was also when the seasoned journalist Ion Cristoiu was set to debut as the station's main political panelist.

In a late-1997 overview, journalist Mária Gál spoke of Tele7 as having the most informative programs, as well as "the most substantial and demanding", adding that, nonetheless, "its viewership is decreasing day by day." Bucurescu gave credit to Tele7 for its ongoing edutainment program, which was hosted by theatrical director Cornel Todea—and which, Bucurescu asserted, very nearly upstaged Iosif Sava's own musical-education show, on the public channel. The Galas were resumed in December 1997, after a long absence, presenting live recitals by Holograf, Valeriu Sterian, Krypton, and Est. Cotabiță apparently left his job by early 1998, being replaced by Adrian Ștefănescu. For a while, Opriș and Avram could still bank on Trandafir and Badea as the stars of morning programming. In late 1997, Bună dimineața, România caused some controversy by turning political, in segments where Badea was mocking the Hungarian Romanians. According to Andrei Cornea of the Group for Social Dialogue, such stances formed a casual aspect of a nationalist resurgence, which came with "extremist ideas" and was overall heralded by Vadim Tudor.

In 1998, Trandafir and Badea defected to Antena 1, relaunching their breakfast show as Dimineața devreme. They were replaced at Tele7 by Laura Dragomir, who changed the format to accommodate lessons in self-defense, as provided by the Romanian Police officer Lucian Ciuchiță. Coșarcă was still involved in journalism, with a talk show called Mafalda. It also featured a segment of live reporting by Barbu—who joined the trend and left to another station in 1998. In June 1998, after the Association of Television Professionals had awarded Mafalda its reporting prize for 1997, Coșarcă and Barbu had an amiable dispute: the former made it clear that the only segment worthy of that distinction was his own, and that it should have been presented to him personally. Around that time, Mafalda was maintaining its prestige with its core segment. Hosts included Traian Băsescu, the future President of Romania, who was prompted by Coșarcă to expose his political pragmatism and indifference to ideology. According to political scientist Cristian Pîrvulescu, this and other moments made Mafalda into one of the "few good political shows" that Romania could boast in that historical context. Overall, Tele7 had switched focus toward journalistic scoops with Reporter Tele7, now produced by Moldovan journalist Iura Luncașu. In April 1997, Gabriel Geamănu won praise for his extended reportage about a diabetic young woman who, upon joining a new religious movement, had given up on her insulin shots—and had slowly died as a result.

Coșarcă's stint as editorial director ended with his resignation in late August 1998, upon which he was immediately replaced by Aristide Buhoiu. This change occurred in the midst of a financial crisis, which had seen the entire news department quitting the same day. In that context, the CNA warned that RomSat stood to lose its broadcast licenses for all media channels it still owned, due to the empty programming slots. Upon taking over, Buhoiu announced plans to set up an affiliate station in the United States, and introduced a slot of his own travel documentaries, detailing his encounters in the Romanian diaspora (the first episode showed him conversing with child artist Alexandra Nechita). He also made George Marinescu, a seasoned TVR newscaster, his deputy director of TV news. He sought to have Cotabiță return as head of the entertainment department, and promised to promote Reporter Tele7, while also bringing in Dan Diaconescu, who was ending his contract with the rival SuperNova. Buhoiu's own show, Cutia Pandorei, had debuted by September 1998, when Virgil Măgureanu and Dan Zamfirescu appeared on it to introduce their newly-formed "National Party".

== Embracing national-communism ==
Diaconescu took over as presenter and producer of the press review, Dintre sute de ziare, expanding on the format with talk-show elements and political revelations—as noted by Irina Margareta Nistor, the "feigned innocence" that infused Diaconescu's commentary was captivating enough, making viewers stick with an otherwise "declining channel"; another critic, Alex. Leo Șerban, was instead amused by "his period-less, comma-less, unorthographical diction". Diaconescu himself noted that he had obtained from Buhoiu a time-slot when other stations were having their evening film, and that he had beat them by number of viewers within a year of the show's existence. He also complained that advertisers were avoiding him, "so as to not give the impression that they are somehow sponsoring the disclosures on my show." By November 1998, he was criticizing the National Peasantists (main pillars of the CDR coalition), airing allegations that they had been bribed by Vasile Gorun, who was facing trial for racketeering. He warned viewers that he was being censored over this issue, and that Tele7 as a whole was risking its license.

This moment marked the start of clashes between Tele7's staff and the CDR establishment. In subsequent editions, Diaconescu vented his communist nostalgia, describing Ceaușescu as preferable to rule by the CDR anti-communists. He aired these views during a live interview with Ceaușescu's niece, Mihaela, who made a point of disagreeing with him. She refrained from criticizing the 1989 regime change, including her uncle's execution, and instead argued that there were no ultimate benefits to having absolute power. In January 1999, Diaconescu interviewed Vadim Tudor, who was now a political ally; during the broadcast, Vadim brought up an alleged affair between President Emil Constantinescu and actress Rona Hartner. The claim was in turn ridiculed by journalists such as Cristoiu and Radu Moraru, who noted that it were not of any public interest; however, Cristoiu also argued that Constantinescu had reacted abnormally, by seeking to censor Diaconescu and his team. Diaconescu himself argued that "those in power" were riled up, and that, as a result, he was constantly threatened with arrest. Hartner contrarily remembered that Diaconescu had failed to support his core allegations, switching to maligning her as "a prostitute, one who strips [for men] in bars. That got me to leave his show, it all came as a shock to me." The scandal was instead viewed as a form of attention-seeking by other journalists, since Hartner, who went on Dintre sute de ziare to state her rebuttal, could not explain why her telephone number and supposed diary had been obtained by Tele7. Later in 1999, Diaconescu sparked criticism with his intense coverage of footballer Ștefan Vrăbioru's on-pitch death, placing the blame on Mugur Bolohan, of the opposing team. Three years later, sports journalist Cătălin Tolontan referred to this as a "horrible" moment in television history.

Tele7's weekend shows received some investment, but, according to journalist Cipriana Petre, in November 1998 were still "as boring as on any other day of the week". Management had also approved of a game show, Ora 1 a venit—hosted by Andrei Duban, it doubled as a venture of the national lottery. This partnership created issues in February 2000, when five forest wardens from Agăș won 5.5 billion lei on a shared ticket, but were unaware of this—since Tele7 was not available at Agăș. Overall, the quality of programming was well below the standard set by other channels, and ratings were plummeting. As argued by România Literară, the station's politics and overall taste reflected Buhoiu's own debt to national-communism, and could thus only appeal to viewers who felt the same way—meaning, at most, 22% of the Romanian public. As noted by the same publication, nostalgia toward the communist regime was evident in Buhoiu's own docuseries, but also in Diaconescu's segment (frequented by "old Securitate assets, now able to pose as defenders of the true national interests") and in Cristoiu's own editorial contributions, which depicted the capitalist present as exclusively "bleak". From 1998, the station had a nighttime psychotherapeutic segment, whose producer and host was Monica Ropotă. She was fired by head producer Mihaela Cutuș in February 2000, despite being defended by Buhoiu. In mid-2000, Ropotă's replacement was producing Nopți albe, which veered into political and social commentary targeting the host's various adversaries (from the 19th-century Junimea society to a contemporary liberal essayist, Gabriel Liiceanu).

The station as a whole criticized the NATO bombing of Yugoslavia in early 1999, voicing support for Slobodan Milošević and his handling of the Kosovo War. Within the Buhoiu-approved grid, the network aired a talk-show segment called Lumea în clipa 2000. It began in June 1999, with its permanent hosts being Cutuș and Marian Oprea. By July, it had drawn attention for having Securitate general Nicolae Pleșiță as a near-permanent guest. His profanity-laden statements censured former anti-communist dissidents, whom he described as impostors (only professing admiration toward Mihai Botez, seen by Pleșiță as more genuine in his protests), or described Pleșiță's own dealings with Carlos the Jackal. In March 2000, Pleșiță commented on the recent death of an anti-communist exile, Ion Rațiu, demanding a moment of silence for this "worthy adversary" and "friend of Romania"; Rațiu's former associate, Dinu Mussulis, condemned the gesture as hypocritical, and the terms used as othering Rațiu. Pleșiță's other comments on the show contributed to his prosecution on grounds of incitement in September 2000. He responded to the prosecutors' allegations with another appearance on Lumea în clipa 2000.

Vartan Arachelian created and hosted another political show, Măștile puterii, soon after remarked for heated debates. One of these took place in late May 2000, and centered on the issue of bank runs; it opposed lawyer Niculae Cerveni to economist Mircea Ciumara and to Arachelian himself. Another new talk show was hosted by novelist Dan Claudiu Tănăsescu, who was simultaneously the mayor of Mogoșoaia. Corina Chiriac, who had built her career as an easy listening performer before having her own weekend show on TVR, took over the weekday afternoon program, Dați vina pe Corina, which began airing on Tele7 in April 2000. Diaconescu, who renamed his signature show as Senzațional at some point around July 2000, boasted record ratings, with an increase in advertising revenues. This claim was received with skepticism by the columnist at Jurnalul Național, who noted that the accompanying commercials were for toothpaste, light-bulbs, and guided tours.

By then, Evenimentul Zilei's TV critic had asserted that the absolute worst of the medium had been reached by two shows on Tele7. One was Ora 1 a venit, with Duban using ungrammatical language; the other was Diaconescu's, which had hosted Paul Philippe of Romania—airing and justifying Paul's claims to the Romanian throne. In Observator Cultural magazine, Ana Maria Sandu shared her thoughts on newer editions of Rendez-vous la Tele 7, describing its presenters as "grotesque" beings, exchanging "idiotic remarks" with guests that were likewise afflicted by "chronic dilettantism". Other programming was similarly panned. Beatrice Bărbuț, host of the children's television series Țara Spiridușilor, was said to be widely disliked by parents watching the show, while Raluca Guslicov, who presented Post-Meridian, had to be fined for repeatedly engaging in native advertising. In this avatar, Tele7 became noted and derided for its extensive coverage of the paranormal, which sometimes blended in with interest in supposed revelations about President Ceaușescu. During a televised dialogue with Buhoiu in November 1999, parapsychologist Ion Țugui argued that Ceaușescu had been led though life by a Romani witch. Topical shows included one co-created by Țugui and Emil Străinu, whose regular guests were female clairvoyants. One of these segments, called Domino, drew coverage in early 2000 for promoting prophecies according to which Romania was due for a devastating earthquake.

Buhoiu-era roaster
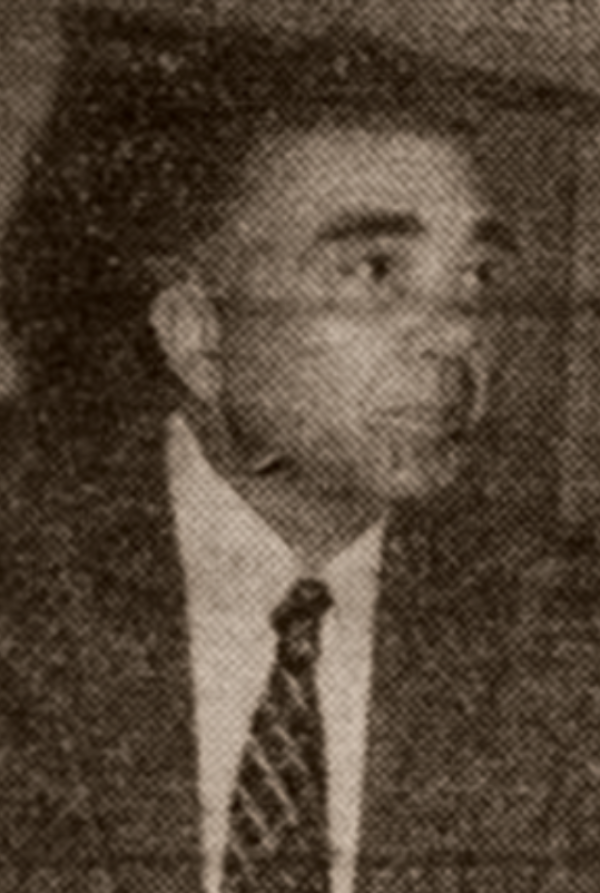
Vartan Arachelian in 1990

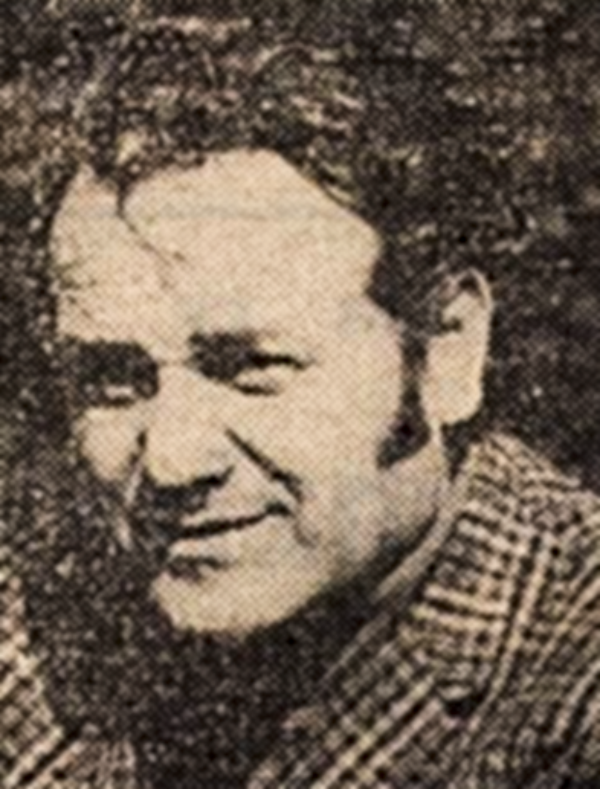
Aristide Buhoiu in 1976

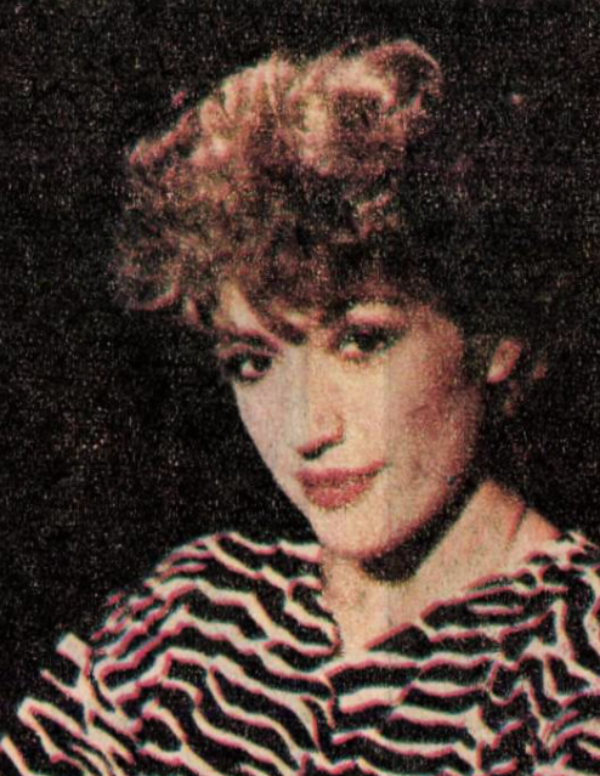
Corina Chiriac in 1988

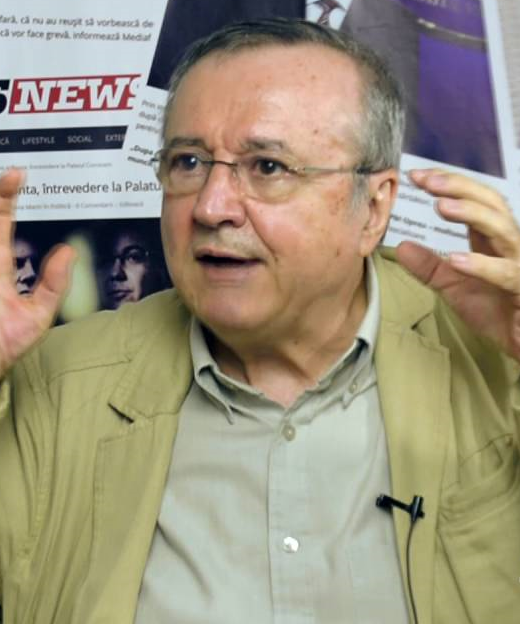
Ion Cristoiu in 2016

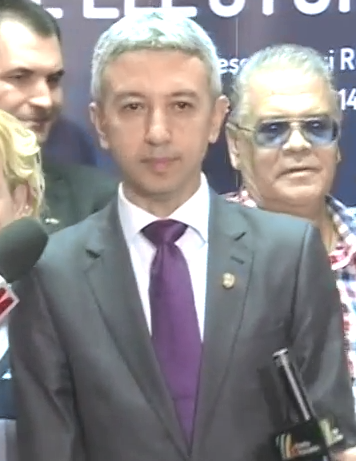
Dan Diaconescu in 2014

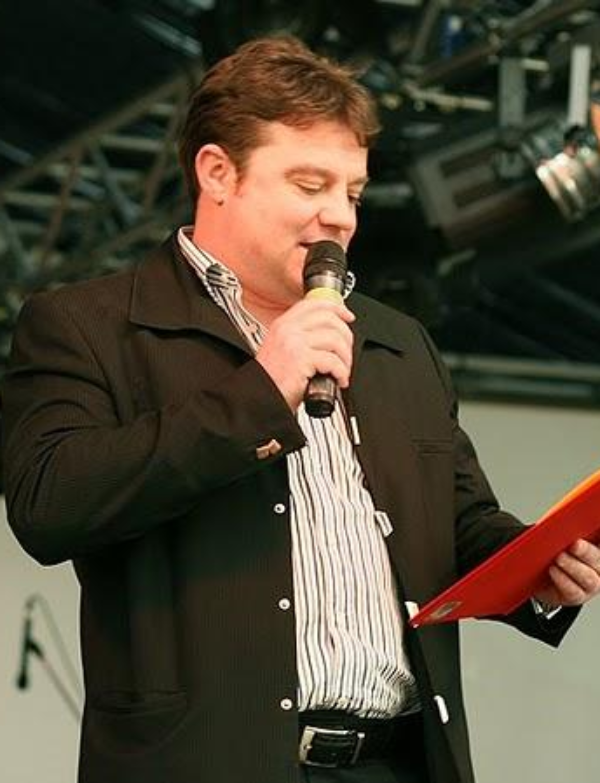
Andrei Duban in 2009

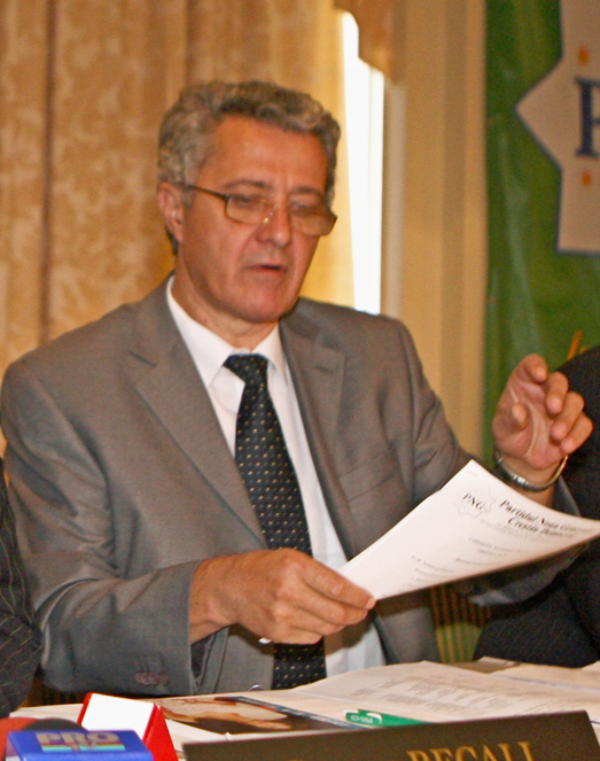
Marian Oprea in 2007

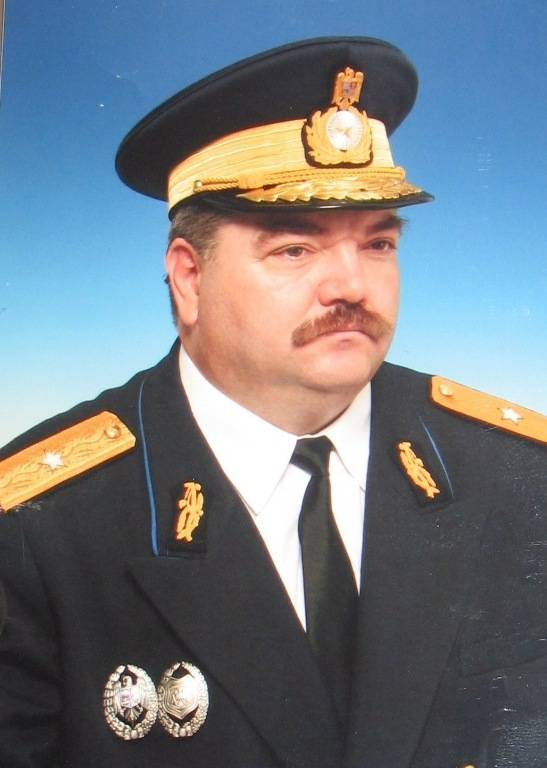
Emil Străinu in 2015

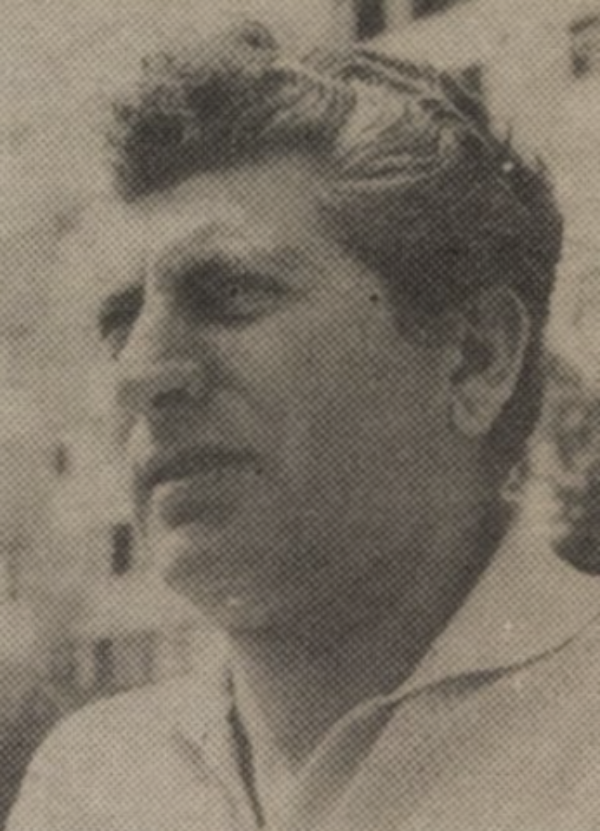
Dan Claudiu Tănăsescu in 1989

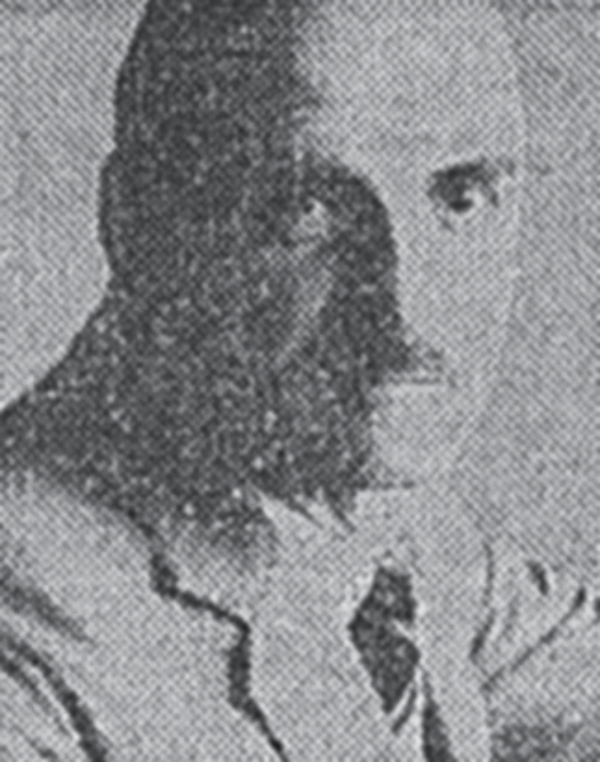
Ion Țugui in 1989

== Restructuring failures and 2000 elections ==
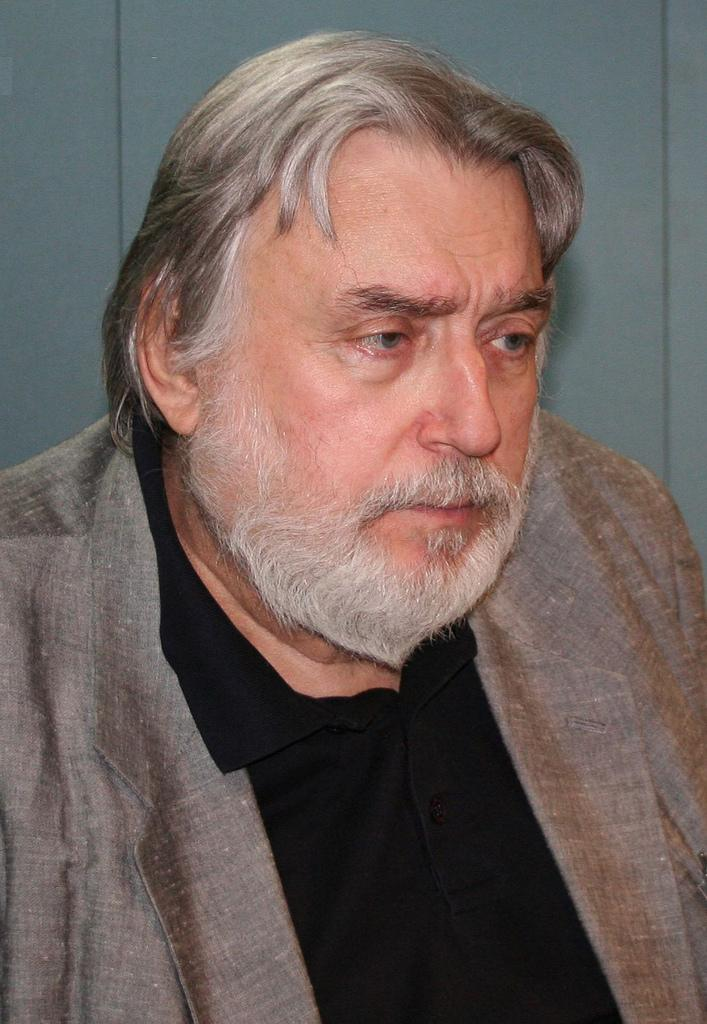
Adrian Păunescu, who handled nighttime programming in 2000 (2010 photograph)

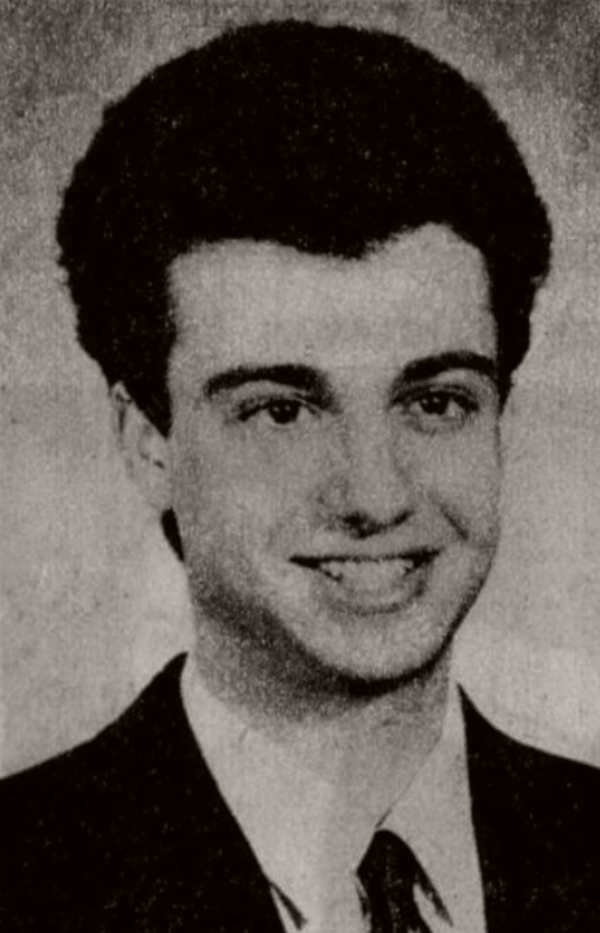
Cătălin Crișan, one of the few hosts left at Tele7 in 2000–2001 (1989 photograph)

On 30 August 2000, Opriș, still the executive director, sacked Buhoiu, after the latter had issued statements criticizing his own station. Shortly after, Tele7 added to its roaster, though the editorial line was largely preserved. In September, Florin Condurățeanu started on his series of Sunday "chats with the stars" (Vedete la taifas). For a while in mid-to-late 2000, the nighttime slot was assigned to a national-communist poet, Adrian Păunescu, who reportedly took the job for free. România Literară noted that the program, which often extended into the early hours of the morning, had outstandingly poor production values, showing the overweight host constrained by a "tiny table", against a "crumpled blue curtain". Regular guests included like-minded figures, such as Vadim Tudor, Cerveni, and Gelu Voican Voiculescu. Several of these guests, as well as the host, depicted Ceaușescu as a reasonable statesman; they also gave positive coverage to conspiracy theories involving his trial. As România Literară noted, the show veered into "verbal delirium, most often of the retrograde and vengeful kind"; however, some other members of the panel were outspoken anti-communists, one of whom referred to Vadim Tudor as a "Ceaușescu lackey" (without realizing that he was also insulting Păunescu).

Other editions of the Păunescu show were seen as of legitimate public interest: on 14 September, the host announced that he would read out key evidence regarding the assassination of labor organizer Virgil Săhleanu. His transmission was mysteriously cut off, allegedly by Opriș. Păunescu himself suspected that management had been ordered to pull the plug by someone in the intelligence apparatus. Days later, Opriș intervened to stop Diaconescu from showing a Betamax tape that management had not yet vetted. The conflict over this issue intensified once Păunescu took Diaconescu's side. A week after, Păunescu reported that he could no longer see himself as aligned with Tele7's journalistic values.

The show continued for a while: in October, after having publicly announced his recruitment by Ion Iliescu's Social Democrats, Păunescu welcomed Iliescu himself as a guest. Tia Șerbănescu described the initiative as entirely catering to the party's interests ahead of a scheduled election. During the electoral campaign, Păunescu suspended his collaboration with Tele7; in March 2001, his talk show was reprised by Antena 1. Lawyer Graziela Bârlă, who had a legal-advice show on Tele7, suspended her activity there upon registering her run for president; she later returned to the station.

The station's election-related shows included guest appearances by poet-journalist Mircea Dinescu, who was endorsing Theodor Stolojan's presidential run as a "technocrat". At these events, Dinescu openly mocked other candidates, including Iliescu (ridiculed for his supposedly opportunistic renunciation of atheism) and Mugur Isărescu. Tele7 also broke one of the last controversies involving the crumbling CDR, allowing Nini Săpunaru, who had lost his job as head of the National Customs Service, to vent his conflict with Decebal Traian Remeș, the CDR's Minister of Finance. The scandal became a national affair when Remeș, who was also a National Liberal candidate, appeared willing to harass Săpunaru using government funds.

During October 2000, Kolal Communication, owned by Israeli investor Liviu Mandler, bought RomSat's shares and acquired control of Tele7; at the time, Mandler was also a major stockholder in Dacia Felix Bank. Tele7 was consequently one of the businesses that suffered with the fall of Dacia Felix, which had granted them large credits. As part of the debt restructuring in 2000, control of the station went to the bank's new owners, including the Israeli investor Freddy Robinson and his Robinson Group, with 80% of the stock. Despite Buhoiu's belief that he would be welcomed back once the audit had been carried through, the Robinson-appointed managers were Virgil Voiculescu and Sorin Fodoreanu, neither of whom had a background in media. One of the early targets of these changes was Cutuș, producer of the news show Linia întâi, who had to be escorted out of her office by Mandler's bodyguards.

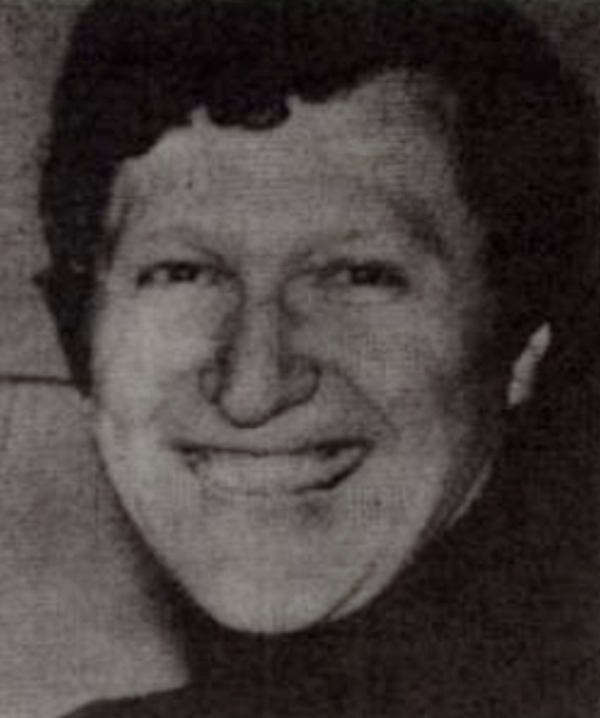
Octavian Andronic, who took over as Tele7 manager in 2000 (1978 photograph)

The takeover was intertwined with the presidential race, in which Vadim Tudor had an unexpectedly good showing, entering the second round with Iliescu (who eventually won). Some months later, Vadim and his associate Romeo Beja maintained that Iliescu had asked Kolal and its Israeli contacts to ban Diaconescu's show as a Vadim-friendly venue. Journalist and cartoonist Octavian Andronic was made Tele7's director of programming in November 2000, where he would serve for only about a year. Upon Andronic's investiture, theater director and columnist Bogdan Ulmu commented:

Let's see if he'll bring any changes. This is the only Bucharest-based channel that has nothing I would ever watch... How come it is worse than the one they have in Slatina, or than Vâlcea's rather well-known television?

== Final revamp ==
The new arrival concentrated his efforts on the new department. He moved Telejurnal to the late-evening slot; instead, the station aired quick news summaries at regular intervals, throughout the working-day. Tele7's entertainment division remained generally unchanged, and continued to be criticized for its production standards. Around January 2001, the company had joined Prima and Acasă in reaching out to fans if the manele musical genre, which came with acts such as belly-dancing, and which traditional audiences abhorred. A "spring cleaning" was finally ordered in February–March 2001, as a result of which Țara Spiridușilor was assigned to the singer-songwriter Rareș Dragomir, while Țugui and others had their contracts terminated. Also then, Duban was announced that his own contact would end—allegedly conforming rumors that he was receiving bribes from his musical guests. Chiriac quit of her own volition, leaving the slot to be filled by a variety show, D'ale lui Cătălin, with singer Cătălin Crișan as its host. This formula was criticized as "a cheap and foolproof way of promoting [Crișan's] own songs". TV reviewer Eugen Comarnescu described it as a collection of bloopers, with inexplicably unfunny segments by Guslicov, George Stanca, and Romică Țociu. Despite the scathing coverage, D'ale lui Cătălin endured as Tele7's only competitive product, and in April had 11 target rating points—something "unheard of since Tatulici's day." Crișan was said to be greatly dissatisfied with the station, with its "disastrous technical conditions" and inadequate location, and was preparing to resign. In June, his show was revamped as a weekend-only edition, Cătălin duminical, which was being broadcast live from the luxurious Vernescu House.

Senzațional was meanwhile scrapped, having exceeded the permitted number of CNA warnings—according to Diaconescu himself, this was a political decision imposed on Tele7 by the newly elected President Iliescu. He went on to establish his own station, Oglinda TV. Its launch was delayed by the CNA, which noted that the Senzațional verdict came with a temporary ban on creating new shows. The issue was debated on Tele7 itself by two senior journalists—Nistorescu (who spoke out against Diaconescu) and Sorin Roșca Stănescu (who declared that the ban was unjust). Oglinda received its permit, but was eventually shut down by the CNA in September 2002, immediately after Diaconescu had repeated his Iliescu allegations while on air.

During March 2001, Tele7 was mainly airing undated reruns of shows by Cornel Todea (who has since quit the station). The reviewers at Dilema joked that the station had thus created a "time tunnel", with "predictions about things that are already in the past." From 15 March, Tele7 officially had an "emergency grid", with original programming reduced to a bare minimum. In July, Fodoreanu announced a new investment strategy, meant to increase ratings and return profitability. He reported on talks with a new set of editors and presenters, including Jeana Gheorghiu and Ada Rosetti, and mentioned his interest in reviving local traditions in television plays and jazz. The station opened a new studio in Giulești neighborhood, with a total of 100 employees by 2004. As the country observed a day of mourning for the 11 September attacks in New York City, Tele7 joined in, filling almost its entire schedule for 15 September with classical music. The overall content was monitored by the CNA, which still found various irregularities. Later that month, the agency held a special meeting with the directors of programming at Antena 1, Pro TV and Tele7, advising them to keep up on media ethics, and reminding them that prime time content needed to be curated for the youth.

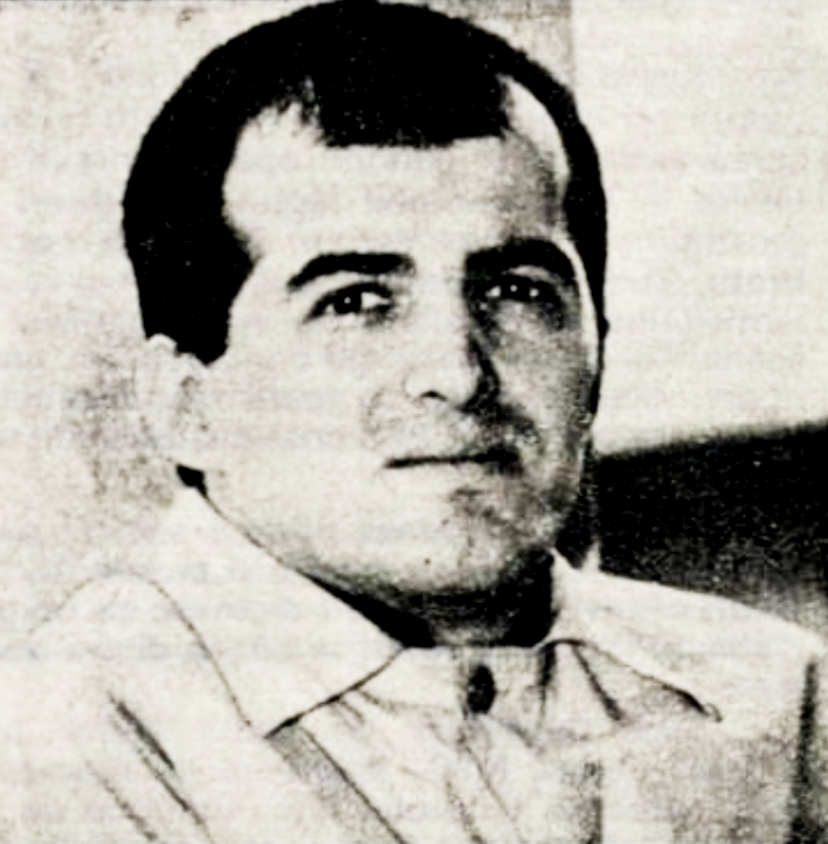
Florin Călinescu, Tele7's last editorial manager (1984 photograph)

In December 2001, control over programming went to actor and producer Florin Călinescu, whose mandate was to remake Tele7 into a pop-culture, "all-entertainment", channel. Widely thought of as having superstar appeal, he centered his initial efforts on a game show that he himself hosted, called Alo, Florin. Its "very large prizes" were financed by Robinson's Eurom Bank. Călinescu also reviewed the commercial success of existing shows, ordering additional cuts: he scrapped Urania's horoscope, engaging with her in a publicized polemic; he also suspended Bârlă's contract with the station, leading her to sue. In April, Crișan quit the enterprise, announcing that he was exploring other projects and formats. The new manager was looking to establish a roaster of celebrities, and considered employing a controversial businessman, Sorin Ovidiu Vântu, as his leading talk-show host. Călinescu oversaw another pioneering move, introducing reruns of communist-era films that were originally selected for their artistic qualities. He was applauded by Călin Căliman for reintroducing audiences to classics such as The Waves of the Danube, Brigada Diverse, Pădureanca, The Silver Mask, and Geo Saizescu's Păcală. Writer Radu Părpăuță noted in September 2002 that the initiative had misfired: Tele7 was copied in this respect by Pro TV and TVR 2, which rapidly exhausted the valuable content, and pushed the three stations into a situation where they showcased "films that are not just artistically bad, but also mendacious, as part and parcel of the communist-propaganda series."

Despite the various attempts at regaining its audience, Tele7 never managed to overturn its terminal decline. According to Ulmu, in December 2002 its movie nights stood put for their reruns of Soviet TV series (the kind that Ulmu and other Romanians had grown to detest), with all other such films, on Tele7 as well as its competitors, dismissed as "American filler and waste out of Hong Kong". In January 2003, the flagship show, Alo, Florin, had an average of 1.1 target rating points, whereas the regular news on Pro TV had reached 15 and over.

One note in the local newspaper Cuvântul Nou panned the Saint Nicholas Day 2002 edition, which Călinescu had advertised as introducing a new format: "we regretfully rate it as a fiasco. It gave us the same anachronistic routines, the same garrulity, those same old jokes." Weeks later, Călinescu invited Diaconescu back as a guest, and together they revisited the Oglinda controversy. A reviewer at Ziarul de Iași daily welcomed the exchange, and in particular since Călinescu had openly mocked Diaconescu's claims about having millions of fans. The same satirist observed that Tele7 was itself in a viewership crisis, its ratings "only slightly higher than a supermarket's closed-circuit television." At Evenimentul Zilei, Costi Rogozanu described Alo, Florin as borderline unwatchable, since the host was permanently "jaded, out of it", and since his political guests seemed to stand for "idiocy in government."

== Bankruptcy ==
Journalist Tudor Călin Zarojanu notes that Călinescu's time at Tele7 coincided with "a personal tragedy, one that he lived through with exemplary discretion." Călinescu ultimately took a sabbatical, but signaled his willingness to return at Pro TV—once stating that he would go as far as to "mop the floors for them." In a 2011 interview, he reflected back on his tenure at Tele7: "It's not that I lost my bet. It's that some Jews tricked me... That was one hell of a mistake to have made." Another commentator, Miruna Olteanu, contends that his reputation was severely and permanently harmed by his dealings with Robinson.

Around August 2003, Tele7 lost its broadcast license, pushing Robinson to engage others in talks for a buyout. This issue became controversial after rumors that one of the prospective buyers was Sandu Mazor, who was then serving as Israeli ambassador to Romania. In tandem, Opriș had sued Robinson over unpaid dues, which prevented the CNA from registering the station as under new management. The station still advertised its intention of airing new original programming, but it remained centered on low-budget ventures. In May 2004, it was reported that Jean de la Craiova, a manele singer, was preparing to host a show introducing viewers to the creative teams behind his genre. The reportage crew was instead employed by Irina Szasz for her award-winning 2004 interview with the 14th Dalai Lama, ultimately aired on TVR 1 in 2006.

From September 2004, the staff was no longer receiving its salaries; after failing to pay up on their monthly bills, both the employees and the station had lost access to basic utilities. By October, Silviu Prigoană, owner of the waste-collection company Rosal Group, was said to be engaged in a takeover attempt, reportedly seeking to recreate Tele7 as a specialized station for manele and Hindi cinema. The deal fell through, possibly because Prigoană was given a full picture of the accumulated debts, realizing that these were overwhelming; in February 2005, the staff advertised its desperation by means of a title card with a protest message, which was permanently displayed over several days.

The dispute over broadcast licensing became a lasting one, but in March 2005 Tele7 informed the CNA that it viewed itself as legally allowed to be on the air—a semi-formal reopening, with Carmen Sterian as general director. By then, the company was only offering employment to some 70 people. The station ultimately closed in April, after filing for bankruptcy with the Bucharest Tribunal. Due to a delay in procedure, one of its final broadcasts was still punished by the CNA with one public warning, despite the company itself being "defunct". An illegal auction of its property was organized in May 2005, with Antena 1 as the major buyer; it acquired technical equipment at a ninth of the value estimated by a financial audit. In November, a ruling of the High Court of Cassation and Justice ordered that entity to hand out 3 million lei (reflecting the "true cost" of such items) to Tele7's brand trustees.

In August 2012, businessman Cristian Ambrozie boasted plans to reopen Tele7, wishing to preserve it as a general-interest station, with some 60% original programming. His total capital investment was reported as 500,000 Euro. Another relaunch was advertised in July 2020 by producer Dan Preda, who claimed to have obtained pledges of support from Cristoiu, Diaconescu, and sports journalist Ovidiu Ioanițoaia. The relaunch took place on 30 November 2021, but only online. At the time, the company hoped to obtain a license for cable and satellite broadcasting.
