= Mihaela Rădulescu =

Romanian television personality (born 1969)

- Born: Mihaela Țiganu; 3 August 1969 (age 56); Piatra Neamț, Romania
- Spouses: Bogdan Rădulescu (m. 1989; div. 1991) Ștefan Bănică Jr. (m. 1997; div. 1999) Elan Schwartzenberg (m. 2004; div. 2008)
- Partner(s): Dan Chișu (1990–1995); Dani Oțil (2008–2014); Felix Baumgartner (2014–2025; his death)
- Children: Ayan Schwartzenberg

Mihaela Rădulescu (born 3 August 1969) is a Romanian businesswoman, television host and producer, social activist, bestselling author, and columnist. She is also a goodwill ambassador for United Way Worldwide, Hospice House of Hope, and Save the Children and the founder of the charitable children's assistance foundation Fundația Ayan. She has hosted the TV show "Duminica în familie" on Antena 1 since 2000, and has hosted or produced programs including Lucky Star, Gala, Punem Pariu că-i vara, Ferma, and Uite cine dansează (Pro TV).

== Career ==
Rădulescu started her career upon moving to Bucharest. She worked as an instructor of aerobic and fitness gymnastics, a taxi driver (when she was a student), a secretary in the first post-revolution government, a referent at the Office of Foreign Relations and Protocol of the Senate, the head of the cabinet at the Romanian Senate, the director of the International Festival Dakino for three editions, and the director and co-organizer of two editions of the elite international model show, "Look of the Year".

Rădulescu began a career as a TV host and producer, becoming number 1 in Romania - "Duminica in familie" (Sunday in the family) at Antena 1, and "Your Lucky Star" at Pro TV. She was the first female journalist to make war documentaries in Iraq and Afghanistan, in 2005 and 2006. During her career, Rădulescu has worked for Tele7ABC, Pro TV, Antena 1, and B1 TV.

Rădulescu served as a jury member on Romania's Got Talent at Pro TV, for six years. She has also been a host for "Dancing with the Stars" on Pro TV. Since 2017, she has been host of The Farm on Pro TV. In 2021 she served as a jury member on The Masked Singer on Pro TV.

In other entertainment work, Rădulescu has appeared in six Romanian films. She was also a voiceover actor as Flame in the animated movie Turbo in 2013 and Mittens in the Disney movie Bolt to dub the films in Romanian. Rădulescu is the author of five best-selling books, published by Polirom Publishing House. She has been on the cover of magazines including Elle, Marie Claire, Unica, Viva, and Cosmopolitan.

Rădulescu is an eco-activist, working with To.org and other companies. She was awarded the Order of Merit by King Mihai of Romania for her humanitarian campaigns and for improving the quality of the public dialogue. She was also awarded Woman of the Year five times for her outstanding philanthropic work and as a social activist. Rădulescu has also received the Tocqueville Award for her charity donations, mostly for hospitals and children. She is experienced in blitzkrieg humanitarian campaigns to raise money for those in need. Her most known campaign was for flood victims, as well as numerous personal donations for different humanitarian causes, mostly dedicated to helping children. Partners in her social activism include Save the Children, the United Way, the Red Cross, Hospice, Baroness Emma Nicholson, and the International School of Monaco (helping orphans from Petrosani).

Rădulescu lives in Monaco with her son, continuing her humanitarian actions for Romania (the latest in 2020, putting together the first trial unit at Fundeni Hospital Bucharest), as well as working as a TV host for Pro TV. Her partner was until his death in 2025 Felix Baumgartner, the Red Bull athlete who broke the speed of sound in freefall from the stratosphere in 2012.

== Achievements ==
- She was the first Romanian journalist to broadcast live from the Oscars and Grammies (Pro TV, 1998).
- She was the first woman to parachute from 3000 metres live on TV.
- Conducted the first underwater interview live in Romania.
- Is the first Romanian star to become a lingerie spokesmodel for I.D. Sarrieri: "Body Up – Mihaela Rădulescu".
