= România Mare =

România Mare (literally translated from Romanian as "Great Romania"), may refer to:

- Greater Romania, the Romania state between the two world wars. Also political movements to unite lands that have Romanian-speaking populations
- Greater Romania Party (Partidul România Mare), a post-Communist populist political party in Romania
  - România Mare (magazine), edited by party leader Corneliu Vadim Tudor
