= George Pruteanu =

Romanian politician (1947–2008)

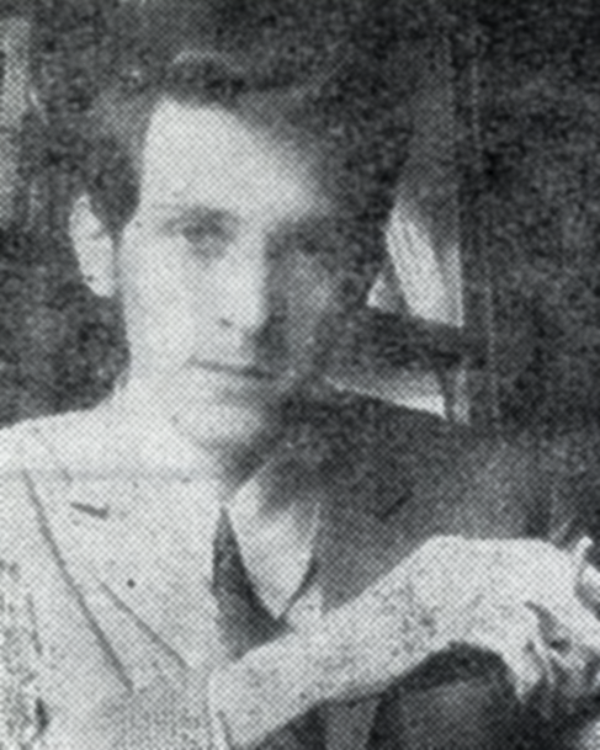
Pruteanu at age 24

George Mihail Pruteanu (Romanian pronunciation: [ˈdʒe̯ordʒe pruˈte̯anu]; 15 December 1947 – 27 March 2008) was a Romanian literary critic and politician.

He was born in Bucharest in 1947. His father, Pincu Solomonovici, was a Jewish medical doctor and a university professor who studied the history of Moldavian medicine. His mother, Sofia Pruteanu, was an office worker. When he was 4 years old his parents divorced and he took his mother's maiden name.

George Pruteanu studied literature at the University of Iași and the University of Bucharest. Starting in 1972, he wrote various columns for literary magazines such as Convorbiri Literare, Contemporanul, and Cronica. After the 1989 Revolution, he continued his work as journalist for newspapers such as Expres and Evenimentul Zilei. Between 1995 and 1999, he was also the host of a 5-minute daily TV programme on correct usage of the Romanian language ("Doar o vorbă săț-i mai spun", a title containing a deliberate, provocative mistake), which was broadcast first by Tele7ABC (1995), then ProTV (1995–1996), TVR1 (1997–1999), and again TVR1 (2006–2008).

In 1996, Pruteanu was elected to the Romanian Senate as a Constanța County Senator on a Christian Democratic National Peasants' Party ticket, but resigned in 1998. In 2000, he was elected once again, this time in Bistrița-Năsăud County as a member of the Social Democratic Party (PSD). In 2003, he resigned from PSD and joined the Greater Romania Party (PRM), running for the Senate in Suceava County in 2004.

Pruteanu introduced a bill in 1997, which became known as the "Pruteanu Bill", requiring all public notices (including ads) in foreign languages to have Romanian translations. A trimmed-down version of this bill was promulgated by President Ion Iliescu in 2004. Pruteanu was also critical of the Romanian entertainment industry, especially of low-quality TV programmes and manele, which he called "intellectual manure".

He died in Bucharest after suffering a heart attack on 27 March 2008. He is buried at Bellu Cemetery.

== Works ==
- Petru Dumitriu: Pactul cu diavolul (1995)
- Partidul și partida – atitudini politice (2000)
- Cronica unei mari dezamăgiri – O istorie mediatică (2000)
- Feldeința călinesciană – studiu monografic (2001)
- Elemente esențiale de tehnică mediatică (2002)
- Translation of Dante Alighieri's The Divine Comedy into Romanian
