= DDTV =

Defunct entertainment television channel based in Romania

- Country: Romania
- Broadcast area: Romania and Europe
- Headquarters: Bucharest

Programming
- Language: Romanian
- Picture format: 4:3 (576i, SDTV)

Ownership
- Owner: Dan Diaconescu
- Key people: Dan Diaconescu
- Sister channels: OTV

History
- Launched: April 1, 2005; August 23, 2009 (relaunched as an entertainment channel)
- Founder: Dan Diaconescu
- Closed: February 24, 2014

Links
- Website: www.ddtv.home.ro (closed)

Direct Digital TV (also known as DDTV and frequently mistaken for Dan Diaconescu TV) was a Romanian free-to-air entertainment television channel founded in 2005 by Dan Diaconescu, as a sister channel of OTV, reairing most of the shows OTV did broadcast. In August 2009, it was relaunched as an entertainment television channel that was mostly aimed at children.

== Background ==
Launched in 2005, the channel did broadcast talk shows & animated series such as "Deșteptarea României" and "Dan Diaconescu Direct", which also aired on OTV. In the summer of 2009, it was announced that DDTV will be rebranded with a completely new programming schedule, getting rid of the talk shows it did broadcast. The rebrand took place on 23 August 2009, at 20:00 EET. Between 06:00 and 19:00 EET, the channel was broadcasting animated shorts, mostly public domain cartoons from Fleischer Studios, Famous Studios, Van Beuren, ComiColor Cartoons, Flip the Frog, The Gumby Show, Fraidy Cat, Bolek & Lolek, Pat & Mat, Colonel Bleep, & others. (most of them being 60s cartoons with the 80s track, plus some episodes from the "revival") and some from Soyuzmultfilm (such as Nu, pogodi!). There were also some exceptions of illegally copyrighted material being aired, like Hanna-Barbera's Yogi Bear, Huckleberry Hound, & Tom and Jerry, Joe Oriolo's Felix the Cat TV series (plus even some episodes of The Twisted Tales of Felix the Cat) and Casper the Friendly Ghost theatrical shorts (apparently taken from the Casper and Wendy's Ghostly Adventures VHS release), Yin Yang Yo!, Herman & Katnip. More Cartoons Classics: Looney Tunes, MGM Cartoons, Pink Panther, Koziołek Matołek, Pies, Kot i..., Proszę Słonia, Tydzień przygód w Afryce, Dwa koty i pies, Piesek Dali, Pomysłowy Wnuczek, Piesek w kratkę, Fotele Jonathana Koota, The Dogfather, The Houndcats, Kochajmy Straszydła, The Inspector, Dino Babies, The Blue Racer, and mores, In the evenings and nights, it did broadcast movies and documentaries targeted at teenagers.

In September 2009, DDTV was fined by CNA with 50,000 RON for broadcasting content (from Warner Bros.) without having the necessary rights to broadcast them, after Warner Bros. notified CNA about this problem.

After OTV was closed by the CNA, Diaconescu used DDTV to broadcast the programs usually shown on OTV and CNA fined DDTV 100,000 lei (25,000 euros) in October 2013.

The channel was closed on 24 February 2014, because its audiovisual license wasn't extended.

In 2025, the channel will be possibly relaunched, alongside its sister channel, OTV. But the comeback didn't worked because Diaconescu is incarcerated.
