= OTV (Romanian TV channel) =

Defunct Romanian television channel

- Logo used since November 29, 2025
- Country: Romania
- Broadcast area: Romania
- Headquarters: Bucharest

Programming
- Language: Romanian
- Picture format: 576i (SDTV)

Ownership
- Owner: Dan Diaconescu
- Sister channels: DDTV

History
- Launched: 19 December 2000; 1 April 2004; 29 November 2025
- Closed: 12 September 2002 (first licence retraction); 22 January 2013

Links
- Website: www.otv.com.ro (archived at Wayback Machine)

OTV, formally known as Oglinda TV (Mirror TV), is a Romanian TV channel owned by Dan Diaconescu, best known for its talk show, Dan Diaconescu Direct. Although it had a large audience, the channel had very often been criticized for its excessive use of sensationalism and tabloid journalism. On 22 January 2013, it was closed as its licence was retracted by the National Audiovisual Council of Romania for not having paid a large sum of money consisting of fines received in the past years, and also for having repeatedly violated Romanian audiovisual legislation. The channel was relaunched on 29 November 2025 at noon.

== History of the station ==
=== First years and first closure ===
OTV was launched in 2000 as Oglinda TV (oglinda being the Romanian word for mirror) by Dan Diaconescu, following the imminent closure of the Romanian TV station Tele7ABC, where Diaconescu moderated a talk show, which was called Senzațional. The station's main show has been from its start Dan Diaconescu Direct (Dan Diaconescu Live), a tabloid talk show lasting several hours, from early evening until late night, and featuring obscure guests such as spiritual mediums, manele singers and local petty criminals.

In 2002, due to violation of laws regarding television broadcast, the station's broadcast licence was retracted by the National Audiovisual Council. This interruption in OTV's broadcast lasted for two years and was seen by a part of the general public as an act of censorship of the ruling government. Diaconescu claimed that the ban on his station's broadcast was because he refused to sell a 51% stake of OTV to Adrian Năstase, who was prime minister at that time.

=== "Investigation serials" ===
In 2004, after the ban was lifted, OTV restarted its broadcast. It featured three news crawls at the bottom of the screen and various on-screen text captions showing words such as Incredible, Sensational, Extraordinary. The subjects debated on Diaconescu's talk show maintained their tabloid style and included scenarios of a looming doomsday, investigation into "mystery deaths", revelations of religious figures and scandals among Romanian celebrities.

Starting September 2007, OTV became notorious for its investigation into the "mysterious" disappearance of Romanian lawyer Elodia Ghinescu, a subject which was debated for 239 consecutive evenings, termed by the channel episodes, and attracted a significant number of viewers. After the Elodia serial other such subjects received similar coverage. The 2009 Media Sustainability Index noted that: "OTV has a long history of offering Romanians extreme forms of infotainment. Its formal owner organizes long talk shows with bizarre characters, and the main topic is various crimes and disappearances. From 2007 to 2008, OTV organized several hundred so-called episodes about the disappearance of Elodia Ghinescu, a lawyer who married a police officer. In one episode, Diaconescu instigated a hacker to break into Ghinescu's e-mail inbox and show her personal messages on the air. Ghinescu became a popular icon, although she continues to be missing. Meanwhile, the mainstream media took over the case and followed OTV's example in revealing personal details about her family." Other Romanian TV stations soon launched similar late-night talk shows, in a process called by Diaconescu the "otevisation" of Romania.

=== Politics ===
Traian Băsescu, President of Romania in 2009, was also guest in Diaconescu's show, where he talked about politics and personal affairs. Diaconescu's support for Băsescu ended abruptly in 2010 when the television personality was arrested for allegedly having blackmailed a Romanian mayor. After his release, a few days later, Diaconescu announced that he would enter politics and set up his own political party.

After Diaconescu's announcement that he would enter politics, the subjects debated on his show started to deal with cases of alleged corruption of various politicians, which the station called ciocoi (roughly meaning fleecer) and to criticise national institutions and state-level decisions which were thought to be against the people, while preparing the ground for the new political party, which was to be called Partidul Poporului (People's Party) by announcing the measures and reforms that the party would take after having reached power. The first point of the measures plan was that every citizen would be given 20.000 euros upon turning 18 years old, which could be invested as the receiver wished. The station soon started calling itself Televiziunea Poporului (People's Television) and Dan Diaconescu started being called the future president of Romania.

The People's Party was created on 19 September 2011, under the name People's Party - Dan Diaconescu, because a party with the name People's Party already existed. Violet and white were chosen as the party's distinctive colors and several graphical elements of the OTV broadcast turned violet. The first congress of the party took place on 21 January 2012 and was broadcast live by OTV. In his speech, Dan Diaconescu, president of the party, said that "he would be the Vlad Țepeș of 2012", that the "dictator" Traian Băsescu, then-president of Romania, would be ousted, and that Victor Ponta and Crin Antonescu were "his [Băsescu's] people".

During the Romanian riots of January 2012, OTV maintained its sensationalist and propagandistic approach when broadcasting live footage of the violent events in Bucharest. The text running on the screen claimed that OTV had become "the emergency service of Romania", that OTV was "the only news television station", that railway transport would be frozen, and that protesters were coming "to ask Diaconescu to become president". These claims were called by Romanian independent media watchdog Pagina de Media, "fantasies" of Diaconescu.

=== Licence retraction attempts by the National Audiovisual Council ===
Following repeated violations of the broadcast rules, most significantly broadcasting propaganda for Diaconescu's political party, the National Audiovisual Council decided to diminish the remaining timespan of the broadcast licence of OTV at that time to half of its length, meaning that OTV would have had to end its broadcast on 28 September 2012. Around the same time, OTV's parent company, "Ocram Television", was declared to be insolvent by the Bucharest Court. Diaconescu claimed that the decision was commanded by president Băsescu and his show in the evening featured a relatively large number of people gathered in the studio, many of them members of Diaconescu's People's Party, waving the Romanian flag and singing party anthems. Nevertheless, the show did not bring much attention from the public, placing OTV only on the 9th place in the rating top.

Two weeks after this decision was made by the council, the same sanction was imposed again, on the grounds of continued propaganda for PPDD, halving once more the remaining timespan of the licence of OTV. Following this second sanction, OTV was due to be shut down on 4 July.

On 24 April, the sanction was imposed for the third time, which was an unprecedented event in Romanian broadcasting. OTV was then due to be shut down on 29 May. Diaconescu's show started later than usual in the evening, after an announcement written in large white characters on a black background that was reading "Today, the People's Television has been forbidden by Traian Băsescu for political reasons." had been broadcast for several hours. Also, a yellow crawl band running at the bottom of the screen announced that Diaconescu was going to "make important unveilings on OTV for the last time". At about 11 PM, Diaconescu appeared on air and held a relaxed free speech, during which he accused various politicians of corruption and also accused members of the NCA of bribery.

After an appeal by Diaconescu at the Bucharest Appeal Court, all the sanctions on OTV's licence were lifted, leaving OTV with its broadcast licence lasting until 2013.

=== Second licence retraction and the Vatican-based television ===
In January 2013, after the members of the council were reelected, a review of the fines not paid by television stations over the last few years was made. It has been calculated that OTV had not paid fines totalling over 1 million lei. Within three hours from the receipt of the decision from the council, the broadcast ceased on cable. Shortly afterwards, an online live stream broadcasting the channel was set up and is live as of March 2013. OTV now airs mostly reruns and recordings of Diaconescu's appearances on other TV stations, notably România TV.

Diaconescu made an attempt at circumventing the decision of the council by settling the television in the city of Vatican, with the Vatican-based OTV broadcasting most of its shows from the studios in Romania, but under the name of a foreign company. Even so, OTV is not viewable in most Romanian networks.

=== OTV Live on România TV ===
On 15 July 2014, 533 days after OTV's broadcast interruption, Dan Diaconescu relaunched his flagship show under a different name, OTV Live, after an agreement with the news television station România TV. Diaconescu stated that he chose România TV because "of the news television stations, România TV was closest to the pattern of [the former] OTV", "studies [had] shown that much of OTV's audience turned to România TV", and called the agreement a 'barter', since România TV would broadcast the show throughout the night and the Vatican-based OTV would also retransmit shows produced by România TV in the rest of the day.

Diaconescu's appearance with his revamped show on România TV was interpreted by some, notably politician Cozmin Gușă, as an effect of the political alliance that had been agreed between the Social Democratic Party (PSD), which has allegedly been using România TV as it mouthpiece, and Diaconescu's party, PPDD.

=== Diaconescu's imprisonment ===
On 4 March 2015, Dan Diaconescu was condemned to five and a half years in prison, having been charged with blackmailing a Romanian mayor, whom he had allegedly threatened with the public disclosure of "real or imaginary facts, such as [his corruption]" on OTV. Reacting to the decision, Diaconescu stated that "they have shut down my TV station, they have shut down my party, now they shut me behind bars".

== Dan Diaconescu Direct ==
Dan Diaconescu Direct, often shortened to DDD, was by far the best-known show of the station, and had been the main show of the station since its start. Resembling a talk-show format, moderated usually by Dan Diaconescu, the owner of OTV, it debated various subjects, often controversial in nature, in a sensationalistic approach. Subjects debated included scandals among Romanian celebrities, revelations of alleged religious figures, scenarios of a looming earthquake or doomsday, various conspiracy theories, events in the life of LGBT people, investigation into "mystery" crimes and, later, alleged cases of corruption of dignitaries. Many of the guests who have appeared on Diaconescu's show were recurring and some have gained popularity just because of their appearances on the show. It was broadcast daily and started at about 8 PM. The ending time has not been a fixed one; the show had sometimes continued throughout the night until early morning hours. At times, the entire show or part of it was in fact a rebroadcast of a previous one.

=== Setting ===
In its beginning, the show was set in a relatively small studio which was in fact a room in the bachelor's apartment from where OTV was broadcasting. Because of this, OTV was often ironically called by press "the bachelor-room". After the station relaunch which took place on 15 September 2009, the show had a large studio, whose table is shaped in the form of a lowercase d letter and also has a stage and a video wall.

=== Unusual events and appearances on the show ===
The live show has been the stage of many unusual events. One of them was the live "trial" of an alleged spiritual medium, called Mrs. Ildiko. She claimed to possess paranormal abilities when covering her head in a bulky bunch of towels. To prove her capabilities, Diaconescu wrote several times some words on a piece of paper apparently without her seeing or knowing them, and asked her to reproduce them using her medium powers, each time with alleged success. As Mrs. Ildiko was using her "paranormal abilities" to find out the secret words, horror music was being played in the background and lights in the studio were rapidly being switched on and off by the show crew, for effect. Ildiko's appearances on the show have been mocked many times on satire shows of concurrent TV channels.

Another unusual event was the live arrest of a man who allegedly had broken out of prison. The arrest took place during the live show in the show's studio, and the man tried to commit suicide before being immobilised.

Another unusual and controversial event that was broadcast live during the show was an apparent aggression of the show's host, Dan Diaconescu, by a recurrent guest who claimed he was disturbed by Diaconescu's insistence to invite him on the show. The aggressor brought a garbage can in the studio and tried to throw Diaconescu into it, without success. This was regarded by many internet users as a staging, taking into account that neither the reaction of Diaconescu himself nor that of the other guests in the studio nor that of the studio crew to the incident was very strong.

Several times during late night hours, Diaconescu had some of his guests to manele during the show on the table in the studio.

On 19 February 2025, OTV will be possibly revived, making its first appearance since 10 years prior, when it was closed. But on 19 February 2025, Diaconescu was sentenced to 8 years and 4 months in prison for child sexual abuse, making the channel's comeback unworkable. However, OTV was unexpectedly relaunched on November 29, 2025 at noon.
