= Dan Diaconescu =

Romanian journalist and politician

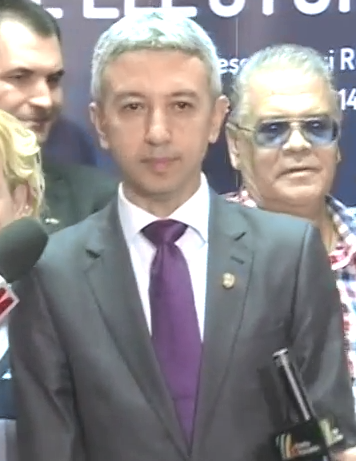

President of People's Party - Dan Diaconescu (PP-DD)
- Preceded by: Position established
- Succeeded by: Marin Diaconescu

Personal details
- Born: 9 December 1967 (age 58) Caracal, Socialist Republic of Romania
- Party: People's Party – Dan Diaconescu (PP-DD)
- Education: Politehnica University of Bucharest
- Profession: Journalist

Dan Cristian Diaconescu (Romanian pronunciation: [dan di.akoˈnesku]; born December 9, 1967) is a Romanian journalist, politician, presenter, the founder and owner of the former DDTV and OTV television channels. In 2010, together with OTV show presenters, he formed the People's Party – Dan Diaconescu (PP-DD).

== Biography ==
He was born on December 9, 1967, in Caracal, Olt County. Diaconescu graduated the Faculty of Mechanical Engineering of Politehnica University of Bucharest, then became well known in part due to the TV show he hosted on his own TV channel, promptly referred to as Dan Diaconescu Direct (Dan Diaconescu Live). The show achieved its success peak during 2008–2009, when it regularly broadcast updates regarding the disappearance of Elodia Ghinescu, which he dubbed the "Elodia series".

=== Trials ===
On 22 June 2010, Diaconescu was arrested by the National Anticorruption Directorate (DNA) for extortion. Diaconescu was accused of having asked a mayor of a commune in Transylvania to take money in exchange for not publishing compromising data. A day later, he was arrested for 29 days, following the Sector 1 Court's decision. On 25 June, Diaconescu was released after Bucharest Court judges upheld the decision of detention.

"I want to tell you that from this moment Dona, my daughter holds OTV and I announce my candidacy for the next presidential elections in 2014 or when are they" were the first words spoken by Dan Diaconescu, after he left the arrest.

On 7 April 2023, Diaconescu was placed into house arrest for 30 days by the Constanța Court, after being accused of sexual acts with minors. He was released a few days later.

== Political activity ==
On 29 November 2010, Diaconescu founded the People's Party, the party idea based on a citizen residing in Cugir. He launched his candidacy for the presidential election in 2014.

At the legislative election of 2012, Diaconescu was nominated to run for a deputy term of Gorj County in one electoral college against his challenger, then-Prime Minister, Victor Ponta. He lost the election, and missed the entrance to the Parliament on redistribution. As a result, he announced his retirement from politics.

== Controversies ==
OTV was two times subject to license withdrawal by the Romanian Authority in Audiovisual CNA, first in 2002 for racism and antisemitic attitude, and second in January 2013 after OTV failed to prove payment of fines imposed by CNA for breaches of the Audiovisual Law during 2009–2012. However, the channel was unexpectedly relaunched on 29 November 2025 at noon.

== Electoral history ==
=== Presidential elections ===
Election	Affiliation	First round			Second round		
Election	Affiliation	Votes	Percentage	Position	Votes	Percentage	Position
2014	PP-DD	382,526	4.03%	6th			
