= Mircea Badea =

Romanian journalist and actor

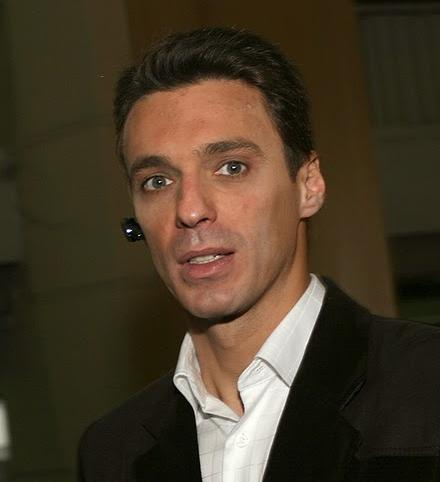
- Born: Mircea Radu Badea; February 24, 1974 (age 52); Bucharest, Romania
- Education: Bucharest Academy of Economic Studies
- Notable work: Bună dimineața, România (Good morning, Romania) (co-host with Teo Trandafir, 1994–1997); Dimineața devreme (Early Morning) (co-host with Teo Trandafir, 1997–2000); Teo și Mircea Șou (Teo & Mircea Show) (co-host with Teo Trandafir, 1997–2000); Noaptea Târziu (Late Night) (co-host with Oreste Scarlat Teodorescu) (2000–2002); În Gura Presei (The Talk of The Press) (host, 2004–present)
- Partner: Carmen Brumă

Comedy career
- Years active: 1992–present
- Medium: television, radio, Internet
- Genre: Satire/political satire/news satire
- Subjects: Mass media/news media/Media criticism, Romanian politics, current events, religion, race relations, human sexuality, self-deprecation, sexual orientation, sports

Mircea Radu Badea (Romanian pronunciation: [ˈmirtʃe̯a ˈradu ˈbade̯a]; born 24 February 1974 in Bucharest, Romania) is a right-wing libertarian conservative Romanian political satirist, television host, media critic, radio personality and occasional actor. He is widely known as host of În gura presei (The Talk of The Press) a show based on the daily news, that airs on Antena 3.

Badea started as a radio host, but later branched into television as a co-host of the Tele7ABC Bună dimineața, România (Good Morning, Romania) morning show. Together with Bună dimineața, România co-host Teo Trandafir, he went on to work for the Intact Media Group and host a show on Antena 1, called Dimineața devreme (Early morning), and then hosted another show on Antena 1 called Teo și Mircea Șou (Teo & Mircea Show). He has also had several film roles as an actor. Badea became the host of În gura presei on September 13, 2004, originally aired on Antena 1, then on Antena 3. Together with longtime friend Călin Stanciu, he is a co-executive-producer of the show. After Badea started În gura presei, he steadily gained popularity and critical acclaim, which also led to enduring controversy and resentment amongst various Romanian media personalities.

Badea has gained significant acclaim as an acerbic, satirical critic of Romanian politics and most Romanian media outlets, in particular the coverage of Realitatea TV, Evenimentul Zilei, and România Liberă. In spite of its type of satire, În Gura Presei and Badea himself have been nominated for a number of entertainment, news, and journalism national and international awards.

== Early life ==
Badea was born in 1974 in Bucharest and attended the Tudor Vianu National College of Computer Science in the early 1990s. After graduating, he enrolled as a computer science student at the Academy of Economic Studies in Bucharest. Jeana Gheorghiu, a very well known Romanian journalist and a family friend, got him his first job as a radio host in the early 1990s.

In 2009, he won an APTR (Romanian Association for Television Programs) award, category "One Man Show".

== Filmography ==
Throughout his career, Badea has made cameos in various Romanian movies. He mentioned his role in the 1999 Sergiu Nicolaescu-directed Triunghiul morții (Death Triangle), saying he appeared in the movie because he had serious financial difficulties and was in need of money.

- Oglinda (1993)
- Triunghiul morții (1999)
- Pitici și tătici (TV series) - 2003
- Milionari de weekend (2004)
- Live (2015)

== Political stance ==
Badea presents himself as anti-establishment. He used to be a frequent critic of president Traian Băsescu, who in turn made a video clip ridiculing Badea. The video clip begins with president Basescu saying "it's raining outside", followed by a long diatribe of an actor looking like Badea complaining that the rain is supported by taxpayers' money. Badea aired a response the same day, which turned the satire on its head by asking a long series of politically inconvenient questions for the president, to which the "it's raining outside" presidential non-answer is played back. The exchange has received widespread media coverage.

In recent years Badea has voiced his criticism against president Klaus Iohannis, the former DNA Chief Prosecutor Laura Codruța Kövesi, the prosecutors, the judges, and generally against the so-called #Rezist movement (mostly opponents of Liviu Dragnea and the Social Democratic Party-led government), whom he all sees as representatives of the Romanian secret services and the "parallel state", the Romanian "deep state" held responsible by Liviu Dragnea and the government coalition for misusing the anti-corruption campaign as political means against the PSD-ALDE government.
