= Gabriela Cristea =

Romanian TV presenter

- Born: October 26, 1974 (age 51); Oltenița, Călărași County, Romania
- Education: National University of Political Studies and Public Administration
- Occupation: TV presenter
- Years active: 1994–present
- Television: Antena Stars; Kanal D
- Spouses: Marcel Toader (2008–2013); Tavi Clonda (2015–present)

Gabriela Cristea (born 26 October 1974) is a Romanian television personality and show host. She has presented various shows on Antena Stars, B1 TV, and Kanal D, and others.

== Early life and education ==
Cristea was born on 26 October 1974 in Oltenița. She graduated from the National University of Political Studies and Public Administration in Bucharest. Then, she went to the Faculty of Sociology and Social Work at the University of Bucharest to study Neurolinguistic Communication and the Ministry of Foreign Affairs to study Diplomatic Communication.

== Career ==
Cristea debuted on television TVR 1 in 1994 as the host of the Eurovision Song Contest. She hosted several morning and entertainment shows on Tele 7abc until February 1996. Then, she worked at Pro TV as a PR manager and presenter for the ProNato campaign until July 2000. She was a sports news presenter and co-host of a morning show on B1 TV from November 2000 to July 2005. She worked on Kanal D from 2007 till the fall of 2018, as the host of the reality show, Noră pentru mama, which is currently known as, "I want you next to me". She then became the host of the show "I love you for not seeing you" on Antena Stars. She presently hosts the show "Like a star" on the same station. In 2021, she launched "Mireasa - Urzeala Soacrelor," a spin-off of the reality show "Mireasa" from Antena 1.

== Personal life ==
In 1999, Cristea had an affair with Tavi Colen, the lead singer of the band, Talisman. Then, she married the businessman, Marcel Toader, for five years and divorced him in 2013. Later, Cristea married the five years younger artist, Tavi Clonda, in 2015, whom she had met during a TV show on Kanal D. Both have two daughters together.

She has confessed in a TV show that once she had an extramarital affair, though she did not mention the husband who she had cheated on.

In 2000, she made headlines when she posed in bold for a men's magazine.
