= Lidia Vadim-Tudor =

Romanian politician (born 1990)

Member of the Chamber of Deputies
- Incumbent
- Assumed office 21 December 2024
- Constituency: Bucharest

Personal details
- Born: 3 July 1990 (age 35) Bucharest, Romania
- Party: Alliance for the Union of Romanians
- Parent: Corneliu Vadim Tudor
- Occupation: Politician

Lidia Vadim-Tudor (born 3 August 1990) is a Romanian politician who since 2024 has served as a member of the Chamber of Deputies for the Alliance for the Union of Romanians (AUR).

== Biography ==
Lidia Vadim-Tudor was born on 3 August 1990 in Bucharest, the capital of Romania, less than a year after the Romanian Revolution which ended Socialist Republic of Romania. She is the eldest daughter of Corneliu Vadim Tudor (1949–2015), who ran for president of Romania several times, in 2000 reaching to second round, but losing to Ion Iliescu. She has been a defender of her father's legacy.

Tudor graduated from the Ion Luca Caragiale National College in Bucharest, and later attended the Faculty of Journalism and Psychology at Spiru Haret University. As of April 2024, Tudor had since 2005 been the editor-in-chief of România Mare, a magazine founded in 1991 by her father and which later developed into the Greater Romania Party (Partidul România Mare).

== Political career ==
On 2 April 2024, the Alliance for the Union of Romanians party (AUR), announced Tudor as its candidate for the mayorship of Bucharest's Sector 5 in the 2024 Romanian local elections on 9 June.

=== Member of the Chamber of Deputies (2024–present) ===
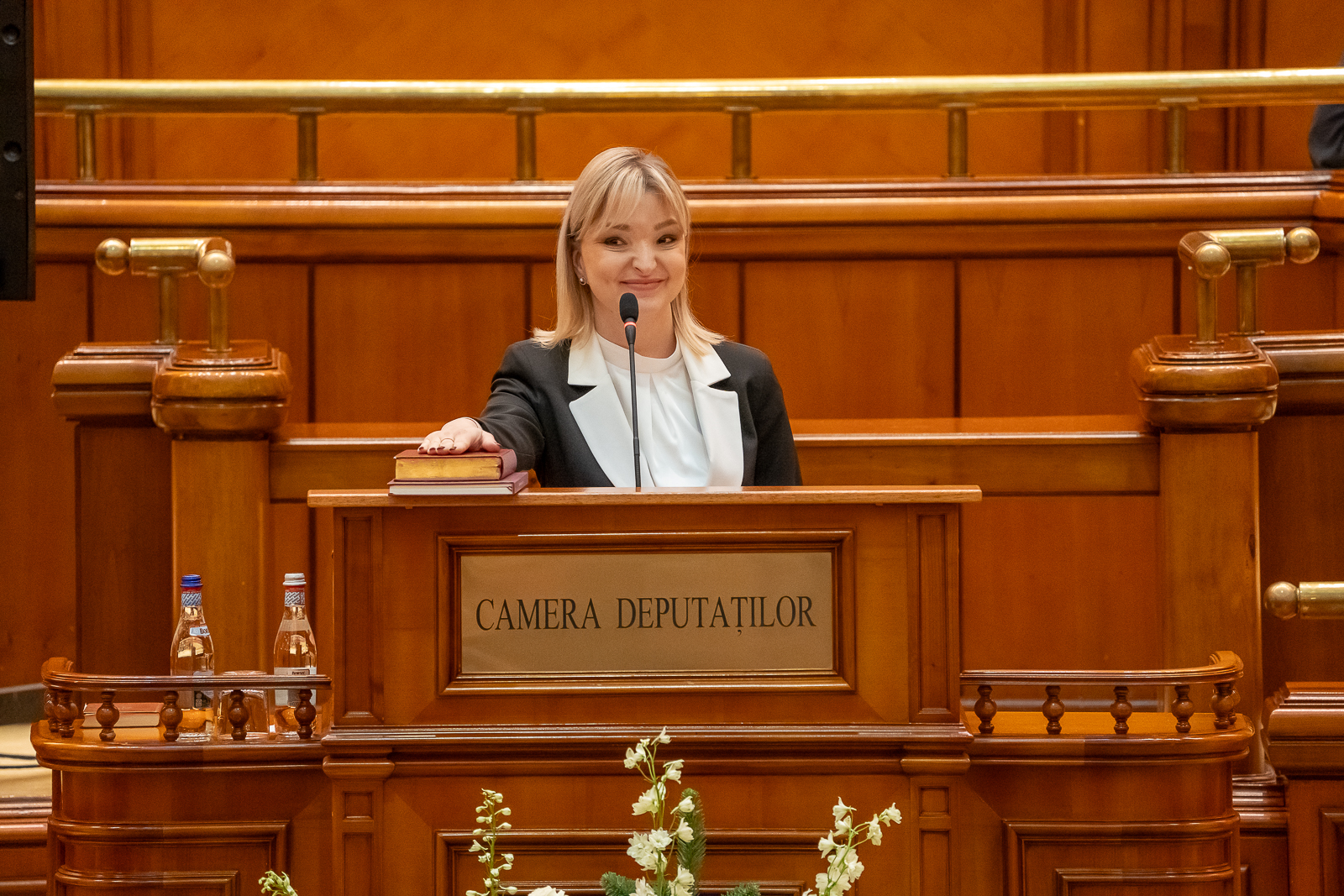
Tudor taking the oath of office on 21 December 2024

In the 2024 Romanian parliamentary election on 1 December, Tudor was elected as a member of the Chamber of Deputies for the Alliance for the Union of Romanians (AUR) in Bucharest, taking office on 21 December.

As a member of the Chamber of Deputies, she serves as Vice-Chair of the Committee on Culture, Arts and the Media, as well as on the Committee on Equal Opportunities for Women and Men. In addition, Tudor is part of the parliamentary friendship groups with Portugal, Austria and Croatia. In April 2025, she expressed concern over democratic backsliding in Romania in the context of the cancellation of the 2024 Romanian presidential election.

== Personal life ==
On 10 July 2021, Tudor civilly married writer Dan-Alexandru Tano, who was 20 years her senior. However, Tano died on 16 October that year after contracting COVID-19, leaving Tudor a widow.

== See also ==
- Legislatura 2024-2028 (Camera Deputaților)
- Parliament of Romania
