= Corneliu Vadim Tudor =

Romanian politician, poet and writer (1949–2015)

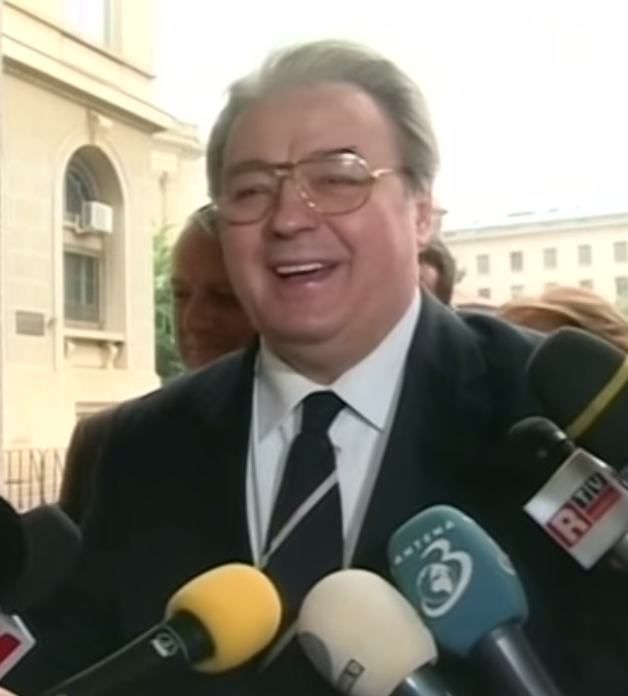

Member of the European Parliament for Romania
- In office 14 July 2009 – 1 July 2014

Vice-President of the Senate of Romania
- In office 19 December 2004 – 14 December 2008
- President: Nicolae Văcăroiu

Member of the Senate of Romania
- In office 16 October 1992 – 14 December 2008
- Constituency: Bucharest

Leader of the Greater Romania Party
- In office 20 June 1991 – 14 September 2015
- Succeeded by: Emil Străinu

Personal details
- Born: Corneliu Tudor; 28 November 1949 Bucharest, Romanian People's Republic
- Died: 14 September 2015 (aged 65) Bucharest, Romania
- Resting place: Ghencea Cemetery, Bucharest
- Party: Romanian Communist Party (1980–1989); Greater Romania Party (1991–2015)
- Spouse: Doina Tudor (m. 1987–2015)
- Children: Lidia, Eugenia
- Relatives: Marcu Tudor (brother)
- Education: Saint Sava National College
- Alma mater: University of Bucharest; University of Vienna; University of Craiova; Ovidius University
- Occupation: Writer, poet, journalist, politician
- Profession: Historian, sociologist, theologian, limbolog
- Religion: Romanian Pentecostal
- Website: vadim-tudor.ro

Corneliu Vadim Tudor (Romanian pronunciation: [korˈnelju vaˈdim ˈtudor]; 28 November 1949 – 14 September 2015), also colloquially known as "Tribunul", was a Romanian politician, poet, writer, and journalist who was the leader of the Greater Romania Party (Romanian: Partidul România Mare) and a Member of the European Parliament. He was a Romanian senator from 1992 to 2008. He was born and died in Bucharest, Romania.

As a political figure, he was known for having held strong nationalist views, which were reflected in his rhetoric and his denunciation of political opponents (a tactic which the judgements in several civil lawsuits handed down against him deemed to be slanderous). He was most commonly referred to as "Vadim", which was a name he selected for himself, not a family name (and not shared with his brother, former Romanian Army officer Marcu Tudor).

== Biography ==
Tudor was born in Bucharest on 28 November 1949, into a working-class family, his father being a tailor. In his youth, being an admirer of the French film director Roger Vadim, he chose the pseudonym Vadim as his middle name.

In 1971, he received a degree in sociology from the Faculty of Philosophy of the University of Bucharest, and in 1975, he studied at the School for Reserve Officers in Bucharest. With the help of his mentor, Herder Prize winner Eugen Barbu, he obtained a scholarship and studied in Vienna from 1978 to 1979. During the communist era, he worked as a journalist, editor, and poet: in the early 1970s, he was one of the editors at România liberă, and after 1975 was an editor at the Romanian official press agency, Agerpress. He served as senator from 1992 to 2008. For the first time since 1990, after the election of 30 November 2008, he and his party were no longer present in either of the Romanian legislative chambers. On 25 September 2001, Tudor renounced his parliamentary immunity from prosecution.

In December 2004, Nobel Peace Prize laureate Elie Wiesel returned the Steaua României medal, one of the country's highest honors, after President Ion Iliescu awarded Tudor the same honor in the last days of his presidency. Wiesel said he was returning the honor because he could not "accept being placed on the same level" as Tudor and fellow party member (and honor recipient) Gheorghe Buzatu. 15 Radio Free Europe journalists, Timișoara mayor Gheorghe Ciuhandu, songwriter Alexandru Andrieș, and historian Randolph Braham all returned their Steaua României medals as well due to the awards given Tudor and Buzatu. Tudor's Steaua României award was revoked by Romanian president Traian Băsescu in May 2007. Tudor consequently announced that he would sue Băsescu for abuse of power; in the end, Tudor won the trial with Băsescu.

As a poet he made his debut in May 1965 at the national radio station with a poem read in the George Călinescu literary circle. He published several volumes of prose and poetry: Poezii (Poems; 1977), Epistole vieneze (Viennese Epistles; 1979), Poeme de dragoste, ură și speranță (Poems of Love, Hatred and Hope; 1981), Idealuri (Ideals; 1983), Saturnalii (Saturnalia, 1983), Istorie și civilizatie (History and Civilization; 1983), Mândria de a fi români (The Pride of Being Romanian; 1985), Miracole (Miracles; 1986 anthology), Jurnal de vacanță (Holiday Journal, 1996), Poems (translated in seven languages, published in Torino, Italy, 1998), Europa Creștină (Christian Europe), and Artificii (Artifices; 2010).

== Personal life ==
Tudor was married and had two children. He died of a heart attack on 14 September 2015 in his native Bucharest, and was buried in the city's Ghencea Cemetery.

His daughter, Lidia Vadim-Tudor, was elected to the Chamber of Deputies in 2024 for the Alliance for the Union of Romanians (AUR) party.

== Ideology ==
In June 1990, Tudor and Eugen Barbu founded the nationalist weekly magazine România Mare ("Greater Romania"), which began as a magazine for the government's policies. Later evidence affirmed "Greater Romania" was released with the help of the Communist administration in Bucharest.

In 1991, they founded the Greater Romania Party, the platform of which Time magazine described as "a crude mixture of anti-Semitism, racism and nostalgia for the good old days of communism". Some statements and articles by Tudor and his colleagues can be described as ultranationalist, anti-Hungarian, anti-Roma and homophobic.

Besides Moldova, Tudor wanted Greater Romania to include Bessarabia, Budjak, Northern Bukovina, and the Hertsa region, which have belonged to Ukraine since the dissolution of the Soviet Union but were part of Moldavia until the Russian annexation in 1812, and part of Romania between 1918 and 1940 and between 1941 and 1944. România Mare has been sued for libel with stunning frequency, often for Tudor's own writings (which he usually, if not always, signed under the pseudonym Alcibiade). Between 1993 and 1996, his party supported the leftist governmental coalition (the "Red Quadrilateral").

Tudor's and his party's change from national communism to ultranationalism took place after 1996. In 1999, Dan Corneliu Hudici, a former reporter at România Mare, claimed there was a "secret blacklist" of dozens of politicians (including President Emil Constantinescu), journalists, and businessmen to be arrested if Tudor's party came to power. However, that allegation only increased Tudor's popularity. In the first round of the Romanian presidential elections on 26 November 2000, Tudor finished second with 28% of the vote. Four years earlier, he had come in fifth. However, nearly all other parties backed Ion Iliescu in the 11 December runoff, and Tudor only gained five points compared to his first round performance while Iliescu surged from 36% to 67%.

Tudor supported Romania's entry to the European Union and sustained its presence in NATO. In 2003, Tudor claimed to have changed his views on Jews and the Holocaust. In a letter dated 1 February 2004, he retracted certain earlier statements he had made as inappropriately anti-Semitic. Further, he wrote: "I know that I was wrong to have denied the Holocaust in Romania, which happened between 1941 and 1944 under Antonescu's regime". Many publicly questioned his sincerity and motivations of the change and viewed it simply as a political ploy.

Ahead of the 2000 presidential election, Tudor, who finished in second, made the reintroduction of capital punishment a major plank of his campaign.

On 18 October 2012, while he was speaking on the talk show Romania la Raport, Tudor said that "in Romania there was never a Holocaust ... I will deny it till I die because I love my people".

He fired an advisor, who happened to be Jewish and a member of the Romanian Chamber of Deputies, Nati Meir. Tudor claimed it was because of allegations of bribery, but Meir claimed it was because of antisemitism. It turned out that the Romanian press discovered that Meir had been convicted in Israel of banking fraud and so was incompatible with the office of member of the Chamber of Deputies. On 15 November 2006, Meir was brought to trial by the Romanian authorities for tax evasion, fraud and swindling and was accused of illegalities concerning work permits for Israel.

Tudor styled himself The Tribune, a title that originates in Ancient Rome but has a special meaning in Romanian history since it stood for certain activists in the self-defence of Romanian communities in Transylvania against the Revolutionary government in Hungary (see Revolutions of 1848 in the Habsburg areas).

== Awards ==
- Knight of the Order of the Star of Romania (2004)
- Corresponding member of the Pontificia Accademia Tiberina – November 2004
- Member of the Academy of Political Science in New York;
- Member of the Russian Academy of Natural Sciences.

== Electoral history ==
=== Presidential elections ===
| Election | Affiliation | First round | | | Second round | | |
| Election | Affiliation | Votes | Percentage | Position | Votes | Percentage | Position |
|---|---|---|---|---|---|---|---|
| 1996 | PRM | 597,508 | 4.7% | 5th | not qualified | | |
| 2000 | PRM | 3,178,293 | 28.34% | 2nd | 3,324,247 | 33.17% | 2nd |
| 2004 | PRM | 1,313,714 | 12.6% | 3rd | not qualified | | |
| 2009 | PRM | 540,380 | 5.56% | 4th | not qualified | | |
| 2014 | PRM | 349,416 | 3.68% | 7th | not qualified | | |
