= Disappearance of Elodia Ghinescu =

2007 Disappearance in Romania

Elodia Ghinescu
- Born: August 27, 1968; Brașov, Romania
- Disappeared: 30 August 2007
- Status: Missing for 18 years, 10 months and 15 days, declared dead in absentia
- Occupation: lawyer
- Known for: being a person who is the subject of the most covered case of this kind in the history of mass media in the country of Romania
- Partner: Cristian Cioacă
- Children: 1

The disappearance of Elodia Ghinescu was a heavily covered missing-person-become-murder case in Romania. According to several news sources, it was the most covered case of this kind in the history of mass media in the country.

== Background ==
Ghinescu (born September 27, 1968) was a lawyer, whose disappearance and alleged murder in August of 2007 led to her husband, policeman Cristian Cioacă, being arrested on December 5, 2012. The two got married on July 18, 2004 and had a baby boy named Patrick in January 2005. Cioacă was sentenced on July 2, 2013 to 22 years in jail, although he continues to maintain his innocence. The case is still undergoing the appeals process; most recently, on December 3, 2013, the High Court of Cassation and Justice decided that Cioacă should remain in custody while the appeals are ongoing.

According to the prosecution, the motive for the murder was jealousy caused by an extramarital affair that Ghinescu had; her disappearance occurred right after she returned from a trip to Dubai with her alleged lover, a former SPP officer, who testified in court to their relationship. Cioacă examined her e-mails to search for evidence that she was cheating, without her permission. He tried to hide the blood stains in their apartment by painting the walls. A dirty police uniform, pictures with Ghinescu and her son, a perfume bottle and a pair of blood-stained gloves were found on 8 October, somewhere between Poiana Brașov and Râșnov. She was officially declared dead on February 12, 2009.

Although Ghinescu's body was never found, the prosecution invoked forensic evidence, including blood droplets found in the couple's apartment and on a number of objects formerly found in the apartment, later discovered in a ravine.

== Media coverage ==
Several television stations were officially warned by the National Audiovisual Council (the Romanian telecommunications agency) for their inappropriate coverage of the case, and some of them, including OTV and Curier TV, were fined for their unbalanced coverage.

The 2009 Media Sustainability Index noted that "From 2007 to 2008, OTV organized several hundred so-called episodes about the disappearance of Elodia Ghinescu, a lawyer who married a police officer. In one episode, Diaconescu [the OTV owner/host] instigated a hacker to break into Ghinescu’s e-mail inbox and show her personal messages on the air. Meanwhile, the mainstream media took over the case and followed OTV’s example in revealing personal details about her family."

Indeed, while OTV profited greatly from the cases, doubling its viewing numbers a few months after beginning to cover the disappearance, more established channels also contributed to the media circus. Pro TV launched a screenwriting contest named "Elodia's Enigma", promising to turn the winning entry into a film, with over 2000 people submitting their version.

=== Reactions ===
Ghinescu became a popular icon, although she continues to be missing. She has been described as becoming a part of Romanian folklore or even "being turned into a brand". A browser game with the title Find Elodia! enjoyed popularity, while her disappearance even became the subject of stadium chants at football matches.

Writer Radu Paraschivescu described the Ghinescu case having become "the codename for a massive operation of prostituting the idea of television".

== See also ==
- List of people who disappeared mysteriously (2000–present)
- Trial by media
