= Emil Străinu =

Romanian army officer and politician

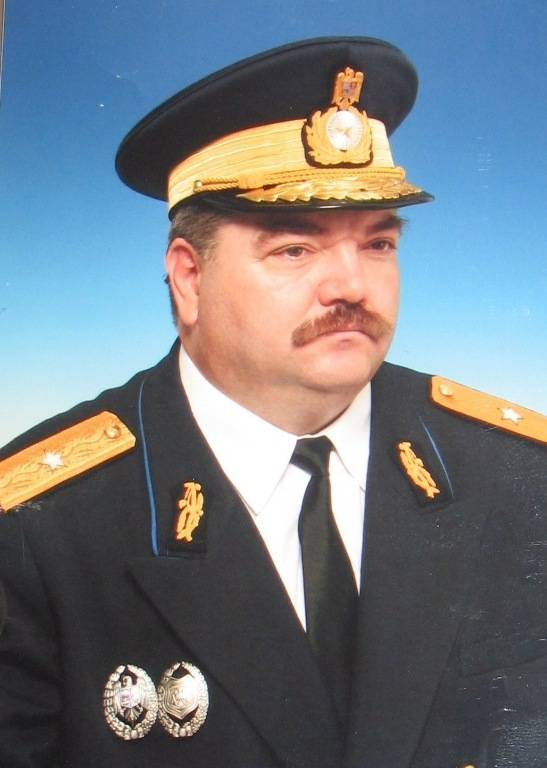

Leader of the Greater Romania Party
- In office 2015–2016

Personal details
- Born: 30 April 1957 (age 69) Bucharest, Romanian People's Republic
- Occupation: Writer, journalist, politician
- Profession: Army general

Emil Străinu (born 30 April 1957 in Bucharest, Romania) is a Romanian army general in reserve, writer, journalist, ufologist, and politician. He was the leader of the Greater Romania Party (PRM) between 2015 and 2016. He is a founding member of ASFAN (Asociația pentru Studiul Fenomenelor Aerospațiale Neidentificate; Association for the Study of Unidentified Aerospace Phenomena).

He is an author of specialized books and radiolocation specialist. He has published numerous books, articles and studies in the field of airspace research about radiolocation methods, geophysical weapons, climatology, UFO phenomenon, and has participated in a large number of television shows. He has over 1,500 articles published between 1990 and 2014 in over 50 publications. He crossed the North Polar Circle five times (Alaska, Greenland, the Svalbard Islands, North of Murmansk, and Kamchatka) and the South Polar Circle, at Cape Horn, to the Arctic Continent.

He has participated in expeditions and travels in areas such as: Alaska, Siberia, Tibet, Easter Island, Greenland, Iceland, Svalbard Islands, Himalayas, Lake Baikal, Kamchatka, Bering Strait (Vladivostok-Russia, Elena Kotzebuse-USA) etc. He has entered forbidden areas, such as Area 51, Gakota - HAARP or dangerous areas such as the deserts of Nevada, Atakama, New Mexico, Arizona, Mojave.

== Works ==
=== Science fiction books ===
- O.Z.N. Universuri paralele, Editura UMC, 1994, ISBN 973-96343-2-X
- Războiul radioelectronic: România - Decembrie 1989; Kosovo - Iugoslavia 1999, Editura Z 2000, 2004 (co-autor cu Sorin Topor)
- Războiul geofizic, Editura Academiei de Înalte Studii Militare, Bucharest, 2003 (teză de doctorat)
- OZN Universuri paralele, Editura UMC, 1994
- Săbiile zeului Marte - războiul radioelectronic, Editura Academiei de Înalte Studii Militare, 1996
- OZN în arhivele militare secrete, (co-autor) Editura Majadahonda, 1999;
- Men In Black - Poliția extraterestră, Editura Z 2000, 1999;
- Serviciile secrete și fenomenul OZN, Editura Z 2000;
- Războiul geofizic, Editura Phobos, 2006, ISBN 973-7683-10-2
- Fenomenul OZN și serviciile secrete, Editura Solaris Print, Bucharest, 2008, ISBN 978-973-88853-1-8
- OZN - Anchetatorii au viața scurtă, Editura Triumf, Bucharest, 2008, ISBN 973-7634-29-2
- Statueta blestemată - teorii și cercetări neconvenționale, Editura Triumf, Bucharest, 2008, ISBN 978-973-7634-20-7
- Cutremurele care vor lovi România - teorii și cercetări neconvenționale, Editura Triumf, Bucharest, 2009, ISBN 978-973-7634-22-1
- Operația Elster. Atentatul terorist de la 11 septembrie 2001 inspirat de un plan conceput de Hitler în 1943 !?, Brașov, Solaris, 2009, ISBN 978-606-92077-5-8.
- Operațiunea Elster, colecția Armaghedon - vol.2, Editura Solaris Print, Bucharest, 2009, ISBN 978-606-92077-5-8
- Un OZN pentru Hitler, colecția Armaghedon - vol.1, Editura Solaris Print, Bucharest, 2009, ISBN 978-606-92077-1-0
- Fuhrerul și arma finală, colecția Armaghedon - vol.3, Editura Solaris Print, Bucharest, 2009, ISBN 978-606-92077-8-9
- Războiul psihotronic, Editura Solaris Print, Bucharest, 2009, ISBN 978-973-88853-3-2
- Razboiul informatic, Editura Triumf, 2009, ISBN 978-973-7634-29-0
- Parapsihologia si serviciile secrete, Editura Triumf, 2010, ISBN 978-973-7634-32-0, ed I
- cu Ioana Vostinaru, C.I.A. Tentativele de asasinare ale lui Fidel Castro Ruz, Editura Axioma Print, 2016, ISBN 978-606-8206-10-3
- Efectul Dumitrache sau Teoria vibratorie a timpului, Editura Prestige, 2018, ISBN 978-606-8863-31-3
- Extraterestrul din lumea duală, Editura Darclee, 2021, ISBN 978-606-9010-25-9
