= B1 TV =

Romanian television channel

- Country: Romania
- Broadcast area: Romania
- Headquarters: Bucharest

Programming
- Picture format: 16:9 (576i, SDTV)

Ownership
- Owner: B1 TV Channel SRL

History
- Launched: December 14, 2001

Links
- Website: www.b1.ro

B1 TV is a Romanian television network which began broadcasting in 2001 as a general-profile channel and became a news channel in 2011. B1 TV broadcasts 24 hours a day, seven days a week all over the country.

== Overview ==
B1 TV is now broadcast via satellite through all analog and digital cable networks and has a 92% geographical covering.

== History ==
B1 TV first broadcast in December 2001, as a local general-profile station in Bucharest, Romania. In 2004, News Corporation purchased 12.5% of the network's shares.

In 2010, SC B1 TV Channel SRL purchased the audiovisual license for all programs under the name “B1”.

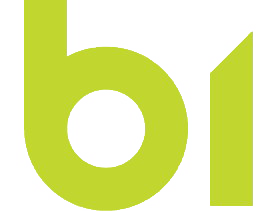
Logo used by B1 TV from 2007 until 2011

B1 TV's rebranding took place in March 2011 and became an infotainment TV channel. Two months later, in May, The National Audiovisual Council (CNA) extended B1 TV's broadcast license up to nine years. In September 2011, B1 TV officially became a news television station and has been broadcasting as such ever since.

Since the fall of 2011, B1 TV has broadcast in a “news and current affairs” format that involves a significant number of news programs and debates.

== Programs ==
- Știrile B1
- Special B1
- Talk B1
- 360 de Grade
- Bună, România!
- News Pass
- Condamnații
- Check Media
- Drumurile noastre
- Politica Zilei
- Fărădelege
- Frontline
- Se întâmplă acum
- Doctorul
- Romi pentru Romania
