= List of newspapers in Romania =

Below is a list of newspapers published in Romania.

== National newspapers ==
Title	Title translated into English language	Type	Notes
Academia Cațavencu	The Cațavencu Academy	weekly, satirical	
Adevărul	The Truth	generic	
Allgemeine Deutsche Zeitung für Rumänien	General German newspaper for Romania	generic	in German
Azi	Today	generic	
Bucharest Business Week	–	business newspaper	in English
Bucharest Daily News	–	generic	in English
Bursa	The Stock Exchange	financial	
Click!		tabloid	
Cotidianul	The Daily	generic	
Curierul Național	The National Courier	generic	
CursDeGuvernare.ro	Lesson On Governance	financial	in Romanian and English
DCnews	Dcnews	generic	
The Diplomat – Bucharest	–	monthly; business, politics, arts	in English
Euro Piața	The Euro Market	politics, economy, financial, generic	
Evenimentul Zilei	The Event of the Day	generic	
Flash News	Flash News	generic	Online Romanian newspaper
Gândul	The Thought	generic	available only online from April 2011
Gazeta Sporturilor	The Sports Gazette	sports	
Ghimpele	The Thorn	generic	
Ghidul Romanilor		news portal	
GoNEXT	GoNEXT	Travel / Events / Restaurants	available online from 2018
JOBSibiu	–	weekly HR local newspaper	
Jurnalul24	Jurnalul24	generic	
Jurnalul Național	The National Journal	generic	
Libertatea	The Freedom	generic	
Money Buzz!	Money Buzz!	financial	in Romanian and English
Național (7plus)	National	tabloid	
Nine O'Clock	–	generic	in English
Oglinda	The Mirror	generic	
Ropublica	Ropublica	Civic journalism	Romanian, English
România liberă	Free Romania	generic	
Ziarul	The Newspaper	generic	dormant
Ziarul Financiar	The Financial Newspaper	financial	in Romanian and English
Ziarul Lumina	The Light Newspaper	generic, Orthodox-Christian	
ziuaonline.ro	The Day Online	generic	
Yve.ro	Yve.ro	lifestyle, health, fashion, beauty	in Romanian

=== Hungarian language ===
Title	Title translated into English language	Type	Notes
Erdélyi Riport	Transylvanian Report	generic	
Impulzus.ro		internet daily newspaper	
Krónika	Chronicle	generic	
Manna.ro		internet daily infotainment newspaper, generic	
Transindex		internet daily newspaper, generic	
Új Magyar Szó	New Hungarian Word	generic	

== Local ==
=== Transylvania ===
- Adevărul de Cluj
- Brasov.net (online)
- Brașovul tău
- Bună ziua, Ardeal
- Bună ziua Brașov
- Cosro - Sibiu
- Cotidianul obiectiv
- Covasna Media
- Crișana
- Cuvântul Liber
- Evenimentul Zilei - Ediția de Transilvania
- Gazeta de Cluj
- Gazeta de Hunedoara
- Gazeta de Oradea
- Hermannstädter Zeitung (weekly in German language)
- Informația Cluj
- Informația de Vest
- Monitorul de Braşov
- Monitorul de Cluj
- Monitorul de Făgăraș
- Monitorul de Sibiu
- ProSport - Ediția de Transilvania
- Realitatea Bihoreană
- Repere Transilvane, weekly regional newspaper in Romanian and Hungarian languages
- Revista Media
- Sibiu Independent
- SevenTimes.Ro, in English language
- Szabadság, in Hungarian language
- Transilvania expres
- Transilvania jurnal
- Transindex
- Tribuna Sibiu
- Unirea, one of the oldest newspapers in Transylvania
- Vitrina de Cluj
- Ziarul Clujeanului
- Ziarul Crișana
- Ziarul de Mureș
- Ziarul Financiar - Ediția de Transilvania
- Ziua de Ardeal
- Ziua de Cluj
- Clujmedia

==== Hungarian language ====
- Bihari Napló, daily local newspaper
- Csíki Hírlap, daily local newspaper
- Erdélyi Napló, weekly regional newspaper
- Gutinmelléki Friss Újság, daily local newspaper
- Hargita Népe, daily local newspaper
- Háromszék, daily local newspaper
- Korunk
- manna.ro, online portal
- Népújság, daily local newspaper
- Polgári Élet, weekly regional newspaper
- Repere Transilvane, weekly regional newspaper in Romanian and Hungarian languages
- Szabadság, daily local newspaper
- Szatmári Friss Újság, daily local newspaper
- Szatmári Magyar Hírlap, daily local newspaper
- Udvarhelyi Hiradó, daily local newspaper

=== Banat ===
- Adevărul de Arad
- Agenda
- Banater Zeitung (German weekly)
- Fotbal Vest
- Jurnalul de Timiș, http://www.jurnaluldetimis.ro/
- Magazin M-R
- Observator
- Prisma - Reșița
- Renașterea banățeană
- Timișoara News
- Timișoara Times
- Timpolis
- Virtual Arad
- Ziarul Timpului Reșița

==== Hungarian language ====
- Nyugati Jelen, daily local newspaper
- Új Szó, weekly local newspaper

=== Bucovina ===
- Crai Nou - Suceava
- Vocea Sucevei

=== Dobrogea ===
- Constanța 100%
- ConstantaFinanciara
- CTnews
- TLnews
- Cuget Liber
- Dobrogea Nouă, weekly regional newspaper
- Replica de Constanța
- Ziua de Constanța

=== Moldavia ===
- 7 Est
- 7 zile - Neamț
- Accente
- Arena politicii
- Ceahlăul
- Contrafort Moldova
- Democrația Moldova
- Deșteptarea
- Dialog
- Evenimentul
- Flux
- Impact Est, Galați
- Impartial, Galați
- Inainte!, Bacău
- Jurnalul de Chișinău
- Luceafărul - Chișinău
- Moldosport
- Moldova Azi
- Moldova News
- Monitorul de Bacău
- Monitorul de Botoșani
- Monitorul de Galați
- Monitorul de Iași
- Monitorul de Neamț
- Monitorul de Vrancea
- News Agency, Moldova
- Observator de Bacău
- Observator Economic
- Observatorul de Nord
- PressBox - Moldova
- REALITATEA Galați
- Reporter - Moldova
- Săptămâna
- Sud-Est
- Țara
- Timpul
- Tineretul Moldovei
- Viața liberă Galați
- Vox Press Moldova
- Yam
- Ziarul de Bacău
- Ziarul de Iași
- Ziarul de Roman
- Ziarul de Vaslui
- Ziarul de Vrancea
- Yve.ro

=== Muntenia ===
- Ziarul Ilfovul
- Ziar București
- CLnews
- Amprenta Buzău
- Anunţul Buzoian
- Curierul zilei Argeș
- Gazeta de Sud-Est
- Impact
- InfoEST
- Jurnalul de Călărași
- Monitorul de Brăila
- Monitorul de Prahova
- Observator de Călărași
- Pamantul
- Șasna buzoiană
- Ziarul de azi Argeș
- Pro Măgurele

=== Oltenia ===
- Curierul de Vâlcea
- Ediție Specială
- GAZETA de OLT, local newspaper
- GAZETA de SUD, local newspaper
- GAZETA de VÂLCEA, local newspaper
- Vâlcea Online

=== Diaspora ===
- Gândacul de Colorado, local newspaper
- Ghidul Românilor, news portal maintained by the Romanian Community in the USA
- REALITATEA ÎN DIASPORA

== In German ==
National

- Allgemeine Deutsche Zeitung für Rumänien

Local and regional

- Banater Zeitung
- Hermannstädter Zeitung

== In Hungarian ==
National

- Krónika, Chronicle, generic
- Új Magyar Szó

Local and regional

- Népújság, generic
- Szabadság, Freedom, generic

== In English ==
- Hotnews.ro
- Mediafax (press agency)
- Nine O'Clock
- The Romanian Times
- Ziarul Financiar (financial news)
- Valahia.News

== Defunct newspapers ==
- Gazeta de Transilvania (1838–1946; 1989–2009)
- Tipograful Român (c. 1865)
- Universul (1884–1953)
- Românul de la Pind (1903–1912)
- Scînteia (1931–1940; 1944–1989)
- Ziua (1995–2009)
- Gardianul (2002–2009)
- Cotidianul (1991–2009)
- Cronica Română (1993–2012)
- Prosport (1997–2013)
- Cancan (2007–2013)

== See also ==
- List of magazines in Romania
- List of newspapers in Moldova
