= Scînteia Tineretului =

Romanian communist newspaper

- Proletari din toate țările, uniți-vă!
- Logo used in 1949

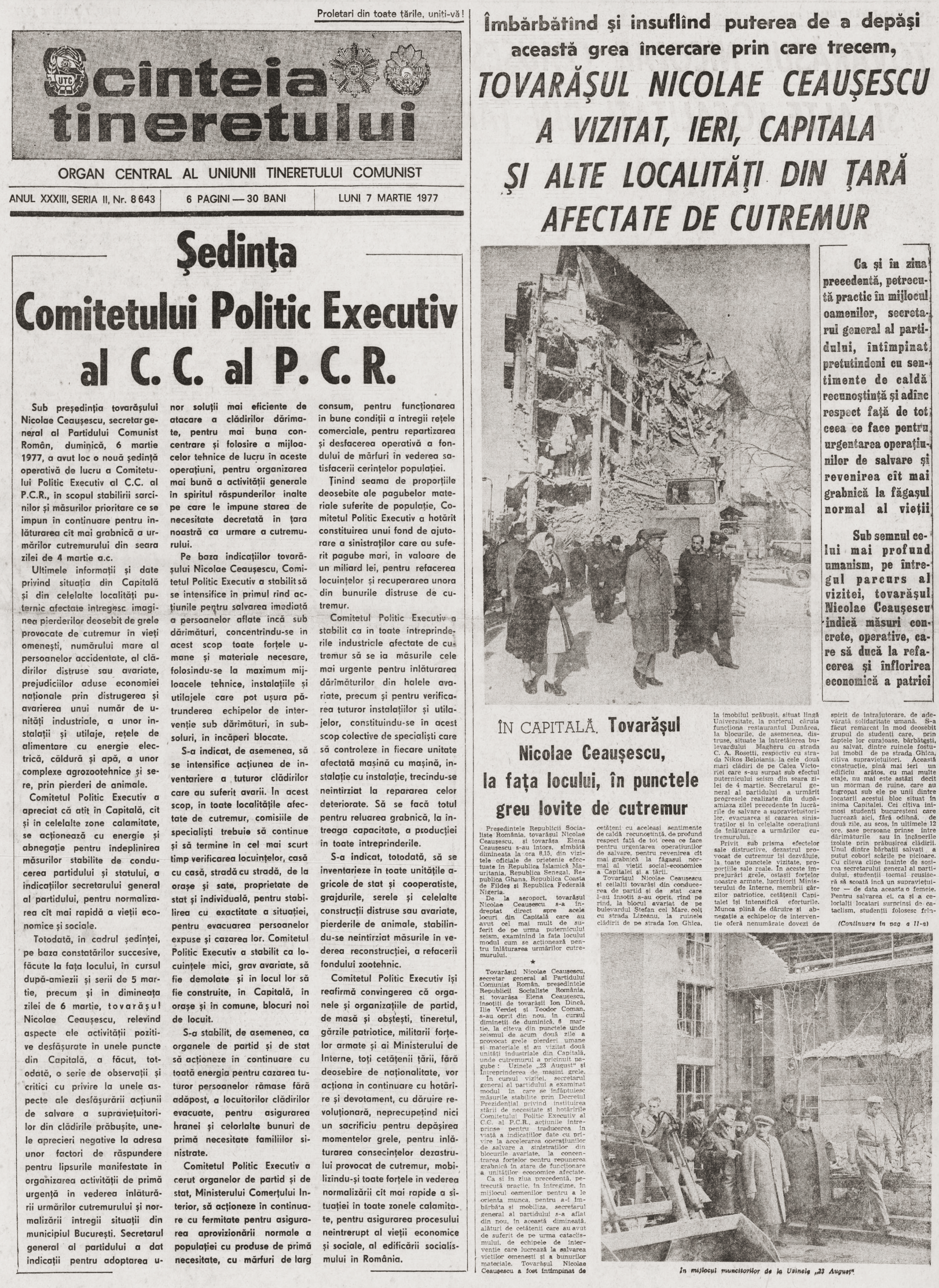
- Front page after the 1977 Vrancea earthquake, covering Nicolae Ceaușescu's visit to the damaged sites in Bucharest
- Type: Daily newspaper
- Format: Broadsheet
- Owner: Union of Communist Youth
- Founder: Mihnea Gheorghiu
- Publisher: Scînteia
- Staff writers: 92 (1983)
- Founded: 5 November 1944
- Ceased publication: 21 December 1989
- Political alignment: Far-left; Marxism-Leninism; Stalinism (to 1956); National communism (after 1964)
- Language: Romanian
- Headquarters: Scînteia Palace
- City: Bucharest
- Country: Kingdom of Romania (1944–1947); Romanian People's Republic/Socialist Republic of Romania (1948–1989)
- Circulation: 300,000 (as of 1970)
- Readership: ≈300,000
- OCLC number: 1412839456

Scînteia Tineretului ("Youth Spark"; originally spelled Scânteia Tineretului) was a central organ of the Union of Communist Youth (UTC), which was itself a youth branch of the Romanian Communist Party (PCR). Appearing daily between November 1944 and December 1989, it served as a companion to the main PCR newspaper, Scînteia. It was founded during the last stages of World War II, in what was then still a Kingdom of Romania. Its publication was facilitated by the August 1944 Coup, which ended Romania's alliance with the Axis powers, brought her under the influence of the Soviet Union, and legalized communist organizations. Scînteia Tineretului was founded by journalist Mihnea Gheorghiu, and, during its first months, hosted numerous political articles by the future PCR leader, Nicolae Ceaușescu. The newspaper played a part in the country's re-foundation as a people's (later socialist) republic, becoming a vehicle for diffusing the tenets of Marxism-Leninism and socialist patriotism into the masses. Into the 1950s, it mounted campaigns against real or perceived "class enemies" among the youth, and openly celebrated victories against the anti-communist resistance.

Around the scheduled onset of de-Stalinization, Scînteia Tineretului's staff was populated by liberals or generic nonconformists—examples include Teodor Mazilu, Fănuș Neagu, Iosif Sava, and Radu Cosașu. The latter pushed the boundaries by openly questioning the role of communist censorship. The Hungarian Revolution of 1956 was received with alarm by the regime, including at Scînteia Tineretului; in its wake, Cosașu was sacked, and the editorial line was more strictly reinforced by a new editor, Dumitru Popescu-Dumnezeu. While censorship was overall reaffirmed, the PCR renounced the dogmas of Socialist Realism. This move gave young writers more creative freedom, which the newspaper proceeded to explore during the early 1960s. Ceaușescu's arrival to power in 1965 further enhanced this liberalization, which went as far as to formally renounce censorship (though editors were still expected to police content for any ideological transgressions). Embracing market socialism, the regime tried but largely failed to make Scînteia Tineretului genuinely popular with the youth, especially in rural areas; the lasting result of such policies was that the newspaper diversified its content and earned respect inside the writers' community.

The early 1980s brought Scînteia Tineretului under the influence of deputy editor Ion Cristoiu and reporter Cornel Nistorescu. While the latter established new criteria for authenticity in journalism, Cristoiu focused on encouraging young literature, setting up a literary salon. At this stage, Scînteia Tineretului acquired its own cultural supplement, the SLAST, which alternated between honoring the regime's new national-communist ideology and hosting outsiders from the Optzeciști generation. The PCR and UTC intervened more directly to ensure that Scînteia Tineretului was taking part in Ceaușescu's personality cult, thus pushing contributors to adopt a standardized wooden language for much of the content. During the Romanian Revolution in December 1989, the newspaper hosted a cryptic message that fueled conspiracy theories; it did not survive the fall of the regime, but was immediately replaced by a non-communist newspaper, Tineretul Liber (itself closed down in 1995).

== History ==
=== Early communism ===
Scînteia Tineretului appeared on 5 November 1944 in Bucharest, the Romanian Kingdom's capital city. Its founder and inaugural manager was communist writer Mihnea Gheorghiu, who structured the editorial staff around his former colleagues at Cadran magazine (which had appeared in 1939 as a front for the then-illegal PCR). Scînteia Tineretului's inauguration came just weeks after the August Coup, which had toppled the repressive dictatorship of Ion Antonescu and had restored multiparty democracy; it had also legalized the PCR and the UTC, and had opened the country to a Soviet occupation. As argued by literary historian Ana Selejan, its appearance was integrated with an unusual climate of "journalistic effervescence", which saw at least seven "literary magazines and newspapers", of various political hues, competing for the same readership. Scînteia Tineretului's public stance during the first weeks and months of its existence was set by Nicolae Ceaușescu, who would emerge 20 years later as the PCR's General Secretary. In November 1944, he was writing that: "there should be no measure taken in respect to the youth without a prior consultation of its democratic organizations".

The paper's initial focus, aired by editorial pieces, was on uncovering alleged fascist sleeper cells, comprising former members of the Iron Guard. Many of these articles were authored by Ceaușescu. Another UTC activist who took up this task was G. Brătescu, the future medical historian, who in December 1944 contributed an article denouncing the radicalization of Romanian nationalism since the 1920s. As Brătescu recalled, he was asked to remove all references to class conflict, since the PCR was toning down its Marxism for public consumption. For the remainder of World War II, Romania fought against Nazi Germany, alongside the Allied Powers. Scînteia Tineretului supported the national effort, breaking stories about workers who took extra shifts so that they could complete production for the front.

The newspaper also hosted articles and poetry celebrating iconic events in the history of socialism, as well as news about communism abroad. On 24 December 1944, it featured Gheorghiu's own coverage of proletarian literature in the United States, with translated samples from Alfred Hayes, Joe Hill, Langston Hughes, Alfred Kreymbourg, and Kenneth Patchen. On May Day 1945, its special issue included a ballad by Ion Caraion, as well as poetry and prose by Gheorghiu, Lucian Boz, Vladimir Cavarnali, Virgil Ierunca, Miron Radu Paraschivescu, and Ion Sofia Manolescu.

At exactly the same time, Scînteia Tineretului hosted a series of literary-themed lampoons that announced the main vectors of communist censorship. These constituted attacks on the Romanian Surrealist underground, as well as on the liberal-minded Sibiu Literary Circle. Gheorghiu tolerated especially harsh mockery of the latter, denouncing it as a venue for escapism; the circle's own publication, Revista Cercului Literar, responded by an article by Ștefan Augustin Doinaș, who declared himself bemused by Scînteia Tineretului's take on literature. The newspaper soon lost Caraion, who handed in his resignation and became a noted anti-communist. According to Caraion's own account, he was disgusted into the opposition movement when, as a Scînteia Tineretului correspondent, he attended a New Year's Eve party hosted by the PCR Secretary, Gheorghe Gheorghiu-Dej; the latter humiliated his guests by urinating over their buffet while they stood applauding.

=== Conventional Stalinism ===
Scînteia Tineretului soon became highly politicized, described in a 2007 dictionary of Romanian literature as of an "obvious propaganda-focused [and] normative orientation"; according to this overview, it was especially "aggressive" in the late 1940s, when it was mainly dedicated to imposing the ideological monopoly of Marxism-Leninism (and, implicitly, also of Stalinism). One of over fifty periodicals directly supervised by the PCR's Agitprop Section, it gave enthusiastic coverage to events such as PCR's takeover of government in 1945, the proclamation of a Romanian People's Republic on the last day of 1947, and the creation of a communized Writers' Union in March 1949. In May 1949, it hosted a pseudonymous article denouncing several university students, including Nicolae Tzone and Dinu Zamfirescu, of "sabotaging" the UTC's efforts. They were consequently expelled, and in some cases prosecuted and imprisoned.

Scînteia Tineretului's calls for containing "class enemies" became explicit, as for instance in January 1951, just ahead of the Winter Universiade in Poiana Stalin. The following year, the regime captured Oana Orlea, a young member of the anti-communist underground. The news was welcomed by Scînteia Tineretului with an unsigned piece that maligned Orlea for her aristocratic origins; in 2006, Orlea herself controversially suggested that the author of the piece was Radu Cosașu. In 1953, the newspaper similarly celebrated the capture and sentencing of a National Committee of Worker and Student Youth, which had circulated anti-communist leaflets during the Bucharest Festival of Youth and Students. It emphasized the links that existed between this opposition group and the Iron Guard, and commended Securitate agents for handling the criminal pursuit with "competence and devotion".

Throughout the 1950s and into the early '60s, Scînteia Tineretului continued to put out official communiques by the PCR (which was styled "Romanian Workers' Party", or PMR), while also hosting conformist opinion pieces and works in the reportage genre, meant to illustrate the success of communist policies. In early 1952, its editorial staff, alongside those of Scînteia and Romániai Magyar Szó, had to take study sessions in the Soviet Union, and worked directly with the Soviet print media institutions. Romániai Magyar Szó, which was put out for the Hungarian Romanian community (and was soon after rebranded as Előre) shared office space in Scînteia Palace, northern Bucharest. Their staffs bonded with each other in November 1953, upon listening to the "Match of the Century"—in which a "Golden Team" representing Socialist Hungary in football soundly defeated England.

Reflecting back on the period in 1979, Cosașu proposed that Scînteia Tineretului may have had the most accomplished staff of any newspaper to have come out in Romania after 1944, being an "airfield of talents". He also recalled that the newspaper stood out on the literary scene by rejecting "boredom, sterile copying, [or] the cliché-ridden, dispassionate, articles." Also in 1952, the pianist and trained philosopher Iosif Sava had joined the editorial board, becoming primarily active as a music critic. As Sava argued in 1998, Scînteia Tineretului was still mainly a "training ship" for Romanian professional writers, and he himself had been welcomed there, despite being generally apolitical. In addition to featuring a literary page, which had Ion Hobana as editor, with Nicolae Labiș and Lucian Raicu as the permanent columnists, the newspaper had a group of "special correspondents": Ștefan Iureș, Eugen Mandric, Teodor Mazilu, and Nicolae Țic.

In 1953, Mazilu was supervising the correspondents' section, urging its members to "pour more pain" into their on-location coverage of industrialization; Țic briefly took over the coordination of fieldwork, but, by his own account, generated a "complete disaster", upon which the envoys were stranded and penniless. Enduring as a staff writer throughout the 1949–1956 interval, Mazilu also tested his employers with his unconventional lifestyle and his approach to political commands, producing a string of articles that he later reshaped into a volume of satirical sketches. Another nonconformist was Fănuș Neagu, who initially worked with Ion Băieșu as a reporter on countryside affairs. He had opted for a permanent job at Scînteia Tineretului only after being asked by his alma mater, the University of Bucharest, to refrain from corrupting his fellow students.

=== Late-1950s transition ===
From 1956 to 1960, the editor-in-chief was a political appointee, Dumitru Popescu-Dumnezeu, who had been moved there from Contemporanul journal. His arrival coincided with issues being raised by de-Stalinization, and especially by the emergence of a liberal communist cell, forming around Cosașu. The latter genuinely believed that Gheorghiu-Dej could be persuaded to tone down his manipulation of truth, and approached this topic during the Congress of Young Writers, in April 1956. As he notes, his thesis, which later came to be known as a "theory of integral truth", was received with indifference by the PMR, which allowed him to collect his salary for several months, and gave him the illusion that he could push for more. This interval of creative freedom was abruptly ended by the anti-Soviet revolt in neighboring Hungary—which the newspaper was quick to condemn. On 11 November 1956, it reproduced a speech against the "counterrevolutionary bands", as given by Ion Iliescu on behalf of the UTC. By 1958, Popescu-Dumnezeu had run afoul of the PMR leadership for running some articles that were not fully critical of the uprising. A party commission headed by Ceaușescu reprimanded him, and ordered Cosașu, who had authored the incriminated articles, to be sacked. Commending Cosașu for his contribution to "integral truth", Sava credits the "events in Hungary" as one of the factors which revealed to him the true nature of communism.

In June 1958, Scînteia Tineretului, through an article signed by Henri Zalis, condemned the reemergence of art for art's sake and "liberalism" in Romanian letters—Zalis' case study was the provincial magazine Iașul Literar, blamed for having hosted apolitical chronicles by George Mărgărit. Over the following years, the paper's initial positions, which were overtly pro-Soviet and promoted the strictures of Socialist Realism ("the imperative of subordinating aesthetics to politics"), were steadily toned down; from 1964, "socialist-realist purism made some concessions to the aesthetic element." The limited nature of such concessions was highlighted that year by one of Gheorghiu-Dej's speeches, quoted in full by Scînteia Tineretului. This piece emphasized the need to enforce Marxist-Leninist supremacy over arts and letters. As noted by the 2007 reviewers, the newspaper always hosted pure agitprop, specifically written for its pages. This was contributed by writers such as Zaharia Stancu, Geo Bogza, Mihu Dragomir, Corneliu Leu, Savin Bratu, Titus Popovici, Alexandru Mirodan and Eugen Barbu, and later also by Laurențiu Ulici. Scînteia Tineretului introduced literary criticism with a series of non-permanent columns, originally written by Socialist-Realists such as Paul Cornea, Mihai Gafița, Cezar Petrescu and Ion Vitner, and later by figures with various other credentials—from Nicolae Balotă, Șerban Cioculescu, Perpessicius and Alexandru Piru to Dinu Flămând, Ion Cristoiu and Petru Poantă.

On either side of the political repositioning, poetry appeared sporadically, and had two main sources—one was the republication of Romanian classics such as Vasile Alecsandri and George Coșbuc; the other was a sampling of young or mature contemporary poets, selected for their commitment to socialist patriotism. Examples of the latter include Iureș and Labiș, as well as Florența Albu, Alexandru Andrițoiu, Horia Aramă, Mihai Beniuc, Ion Brad, Marcel Breslașu, Nina Cassian, Dan Deșliu, Eugen Jebeleanu, Florin Mugur, Darie Novăceanu, Adrian Păunescu, Veronica Porumbacu, Marin Sorescu, George Țărnea, Gheorghe Tomozei, and Victor Tulbure. These and other authors also contributed translations from the socialist poetry of other nations—sampling Ilya Ehrenburg and Vladimir Mayakovsky. Fragments of more or less politically charged literary prose appeared with some regularity, with authors ranging from Barbu, Beniuc, Mazilu, Neagu, Tudor Arghezi, Camil Petrescu, Ion Marin Sadoveanu, and Mihail Sadoveanu to Petru Dumitriu, Marin Preda, Radu Boureanu, Tita Chiper, Laurențiu Fulga, Haralamb Zincă, and Francisc Munteanu. Scînteia Tineretului was also the last publication to commission an article by the educator Constantin Kirițescu, published posthumously on 27 November 1965.

Nonconformist team of the mid-1950s
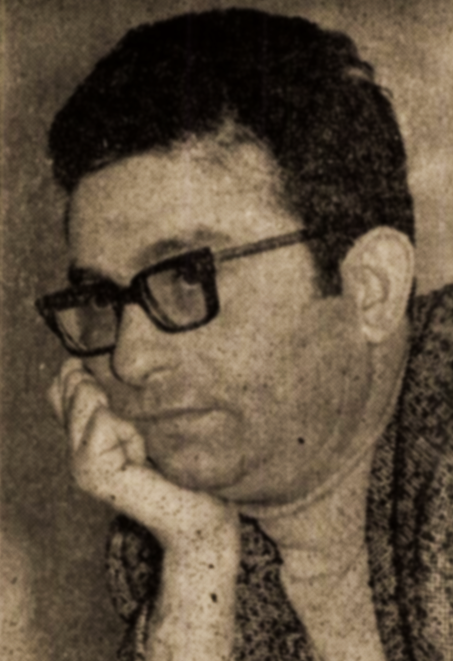
Radu Cosașu in 1972

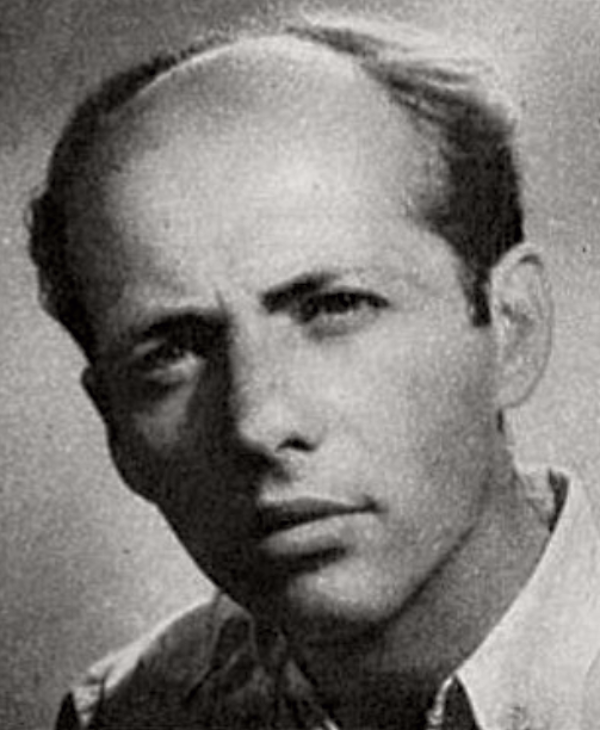
Teodor Mazilu in 1959

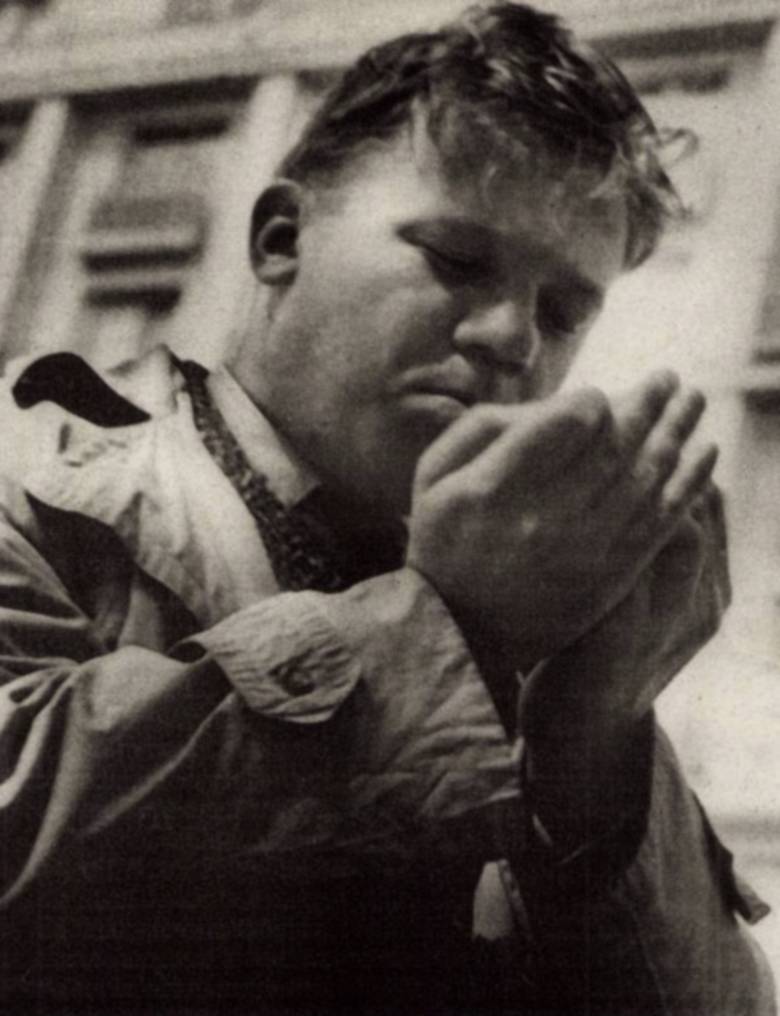
Fănuș Neagu in 1959

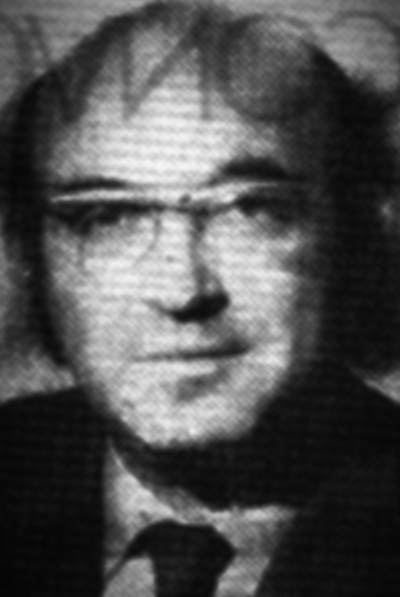
Iosif Sava in 1983

=== Liberalization years ===
Once Ceaușescu was installed as General Secretary of the PCR, he allowed a degree of mass-media liberalization—a major taboo had already been breached in October 1964, when the PCR's Directorate of the Press accepted criticism of its censorship function, and offered to disperse its staff as mere editors of the central organs (including Scînteia Tineretului). In 1966, however, the newspaper's editor-in-chief was confirmed as an office of the PCR nomenklatura, with Emil Mitrache being directly appointed by the party's executive committee. In June 1967, censorship intervened at Scînteia Tineretului to remove portions of an interview with journalist Ilie Purcaru, which contained unflattering remarks about Soviet propaganda. A year after, Scînteia Tineretului and all other Romanian periodicals were given a go-ahead to criticize the Soviet-led invasion of Czechoslovakia, in line with Ceaușescu's speech of 21 August 1968. In that context, the newspaper published reports by Eugen Ionescu, its envoy in Prague, which detailed the locals' resentments toward the Soviet Army.

By then, Ceaușescu's Romania had embarked on experiments in market socialism, aiming to create an ideologically contained consumer society, and embracing a program of rural systematization. Commenting on these developments, geographers Octavian Groza and Ionel Muntele noted that traditional villages were more closely integrated with urban culture, which was tinged by propaganda: the Romanian Post would distribute Scînteia Tineretului "down to the very last of the hamlets". In 1972, the authorities remarked that there was still a rural–urban gap, since Scînteia Tineretului and any other newspaper only sold 95 copies to 1,000 peasants (as compared to 310 copies per 1,000 urbanites). In January 1966, the Directorate of the Press dedicated more funds to increasing the size of its central newspapers, with Scînteia Tineretului now running a six-page issue thrice a week, instead of a once-a-week special. Party officials were optimistic about its readership, allowing it to print 412,000 copies per issue. Only 344,000 copies were actually being sold by 1967, and, after objections raised by officials involved in paper recycling, the circulation was revised down to 380,000 copies. Three years later, it ran 300,000 copies, and only sold 280,000. Around that time, the Directorate became aware that Scînteia Tineretului was one of the newspapers relying on "collective subscriptions" by the state institutions, which had reduced its overall profits and made its actual readership hard to ascertain. The practice was condemned and phased out. By 1971, there were calls for additional paper allocation, since the newspaper now had more individual readers than available copies.

Writing for the rival UTC magazine Amfiteatru in January 1967, Doina Mantu praised the editors for their "increasingly interesting" newspaper. She referred especially to their cultivation of short prose, which included hosting the debut of four young writers, as well as to a critical essay on the subject, penned by Mihai Ungheanu. By early 1968, the content was still diversified enough to include sports writing by Aristide Buhoiu—his essays were praised by a colleague, Petre Dragu, as representing some of the best sports coverage in Romania. Late that year, Grigore Traian Pop and Elena Zaharia-Filipaș were contributors to a new section on philosophy, introducing Romanian youth to the works of Herbert Marcuse, and classifying the various schools of Existentialism. Economist Adrian Vasilescu, who worked as an opinion journalist at Scînteia Tineretului from his college years (and later switched to Scînteia), recalls that he was paid exceptionally well, "as much as a university professor or a factory manager." Vasilescu remained in constant contact with the Securitate after 1970, being asked to spy on his colleagues. According to his own recollections, he never signed an agreement to ask as informant, only agreeing to provide the Securitate with notes on his travels abroad.

Around May 1974, Ceaușescu had become personally invested in the issue of paper waste, proposing to the PCR Secretariat that all newspapers be made to reduce circulation. Under his plan, Scînteia Tineretului would only have appeared five days a week, and its paper allotment would have been reduced by some 700 tons. The proposal was successfully amended by the PCR cadre Cornel Burtică, but the allocation was still reduced, and some state institutions were ordered to cancel all remaining "collective subscriptions" to Scînteia Tineretului; its staff was also reduced, to a total of 900. The effort to conserve paper was still evident during the 1980 stage of the Five-Year Plan, when the Young Pioneers were called up for a contest in "socialist emulation", to help recycle scrap paper for the Bucharest printing presses. In an interview of 1981, one participant in this competition recorded her joy at knowing that Scînteia Tineretului and Cutezătorii magazine were still being printed on paper that she and her colleagues had brought in.

From March 1976 to 1980, Scînteia Tineretului was managed by a new editor-in-chief, Nicolae Dan Fruntelată. As a UTC cadre, he had previously handled Amfiteatru, and was highly regarded by his PCR supervisors. The censorship apparatus was formally disestablished in 1977, and, following the 1964 outline, many of its employees became editors in the central press. In practice, this meant that the receiving newspapers, including Scînteia Tineretului, now censored themselves, through the intervention of "vetted" cadres directly involved with putting out each new issue. In the mid-to-late 1970s, the newspaper featured several cultural debates on topics such as the "social responsibility of writers" and "communism as mirrored in literature". Its political writing also covered reportage pieces describing the lives of workers from Jiu Valley and the Iron Gates power station. These were retrospectively panned in 1981 by Florian Mureșan of Amfiteatru, who noted that the interviewees sounded like the reports themselves, and that the information they transmitted was always "stereotypical".

=== Cristoiu's arrival ===
Scînteia Tineretului had managed to branch out into other areas of culture, hosting a musical column (contributed by Sava and Octavian Ursulescu), a film chronicle (with contributions by Mugur and Cosașu), and a review of the visual arts scene (signed by Albu and Petru Comarnescu); there was also an in-depth "weekly review of culture", by Aurel Baranga, alongside occasional "road diaries" by Porumbacu, D. I. Suchianu and others. In 1975, tennis champion Ion Țiriac gave serialized advice on how to pick up the sport. Reportedly, the entire youth population in places such as Hotarele, Periș and Băiculești began training in tennis. Gymnast Nadia Comăneci was an occasional correspondent around the time of her record-breaking performance in the artistic all-around at the 1976 Summer Olympics. By her own account, the congratulatory letters she received from readers had filled an entire room in the newspaper's central offices, and had still not been cleared out of there in 1986. As a rule, it was Ion Băieșu who handled the letters to the editor, published as De la om la om ("Man to Man"). According to Groza and Muntele, this type of columns in particular gave peasant readers "the impression of [editorial] transparency".

For much of the 1980s (down to 1987), Cristoiu was the newspaper's deputy editor, and expanded its literary content—while also inaugurating a Scînteia Tineretului literary salon, which was known as Confluențe ("Confluences"). His appointment there had followed a lengthy "ceremony" of vetting, directly implicating the UTC. By April 1981, the newspaper had a permanent literary, art and philosophy page, called Opinia literară și artistică and centered on Confluențe contributors. It was saluted by Ramuri magazine as "lively", a place for "young creators [to] express themselves openly, piercingly, on the various aspects of contemporary culture". On 20 September 1981, Scînteia Tineretului acquired its own literary and artistic supplement, or SLAST; published weekly as a 12-page fascicle, it could be bought separately from the newspaper itself. Directly managed by Cristoiu and Victor Atanasiu, it had a group of permanent collaborators, including Emil Brumaru (who provided advice to aspiring authors), Alex. Ștefănescu (who held the "young literature" column), Dan Ciachir, Gheorghe Grigurcu, Mircea Iorgulescu, Cornel Nistorescu, Artur Silvestri, and Henri Zalis; their collective effort was toward diversifying the content and securing a venue for freer speech.

Of this group, Nistorescu had been a deputy editor at two UTC-linked magazines, Viața Studențească and Amfiteatru. By his own account, he was "incapable of being a leader in that sort of formula that they had back then"; he preferred being a "simple reporter" at Scînteia Tineretului. Assisted by Ștefănescu and Iorgulescu, in October 1980 he began a campaign against the "literary reportage", compiling an anthology of "received ideas" and inept quotations from the previous decade, and declaring the genre as a whole to have been an instrument for lying. Nistorescu's own contributions were in immersion journalism: in September 1981, Eugen Barbu's rival newspaper, Săptămîna, praised him for his undercover piece about working on Bucharest's black market. He was later promoted to sectional manager, but his section was disestablished shortly after.

Scholar Nicolae Bârna reviews SLAST's first-issue manifesto as "opportunistic [and] conformist", though only to the measure where it "blunted the vigilance of 'superior [party] cadres'"; the text paid lip service to "engaged art" as demanded by the authorities, but vented mild criticism of routine and conventionality. More controversially, the SLAST provided support for the national-communists' conflict with the Writers' Union, with Cristoiu endorsing Nicolae Dragoș as that syndicate's president, against the majority of writers. From its first issues, the weekly fascicle had poetry and short prose by authors of various backgrounds—examples include Ciachir, Fruntelată, George Arion, Lucian Avramescu, Traian T. Coșovei, Carmen Firan, Carolina Ilinca, Ioan Lăcustă, Ion Bogdan Lefter, Mircea Nedelciu, Tudor Octavian, Sorin Preda, Liviu Ioan Stoiciu, Grete Tartler, Cristian Teodorescu, Doina Uricariu, and Corneliu Vadim Tudor. One early contribution was a memoir of life in mid-century Bucharest, offered by Mircea Cărtărescu. As noted by Bârna, it already developed themes that would later become mainstays of Cărtărescu's novels. SLAST popularized creators in other fields, including theater crafts (as a series of interviews with Cătălina Buzoianu, Mihai Mălaimare, Alexa Visarion, Matei Vișniec, and various others), as well as Romanian science fiction.

1980s writing staff
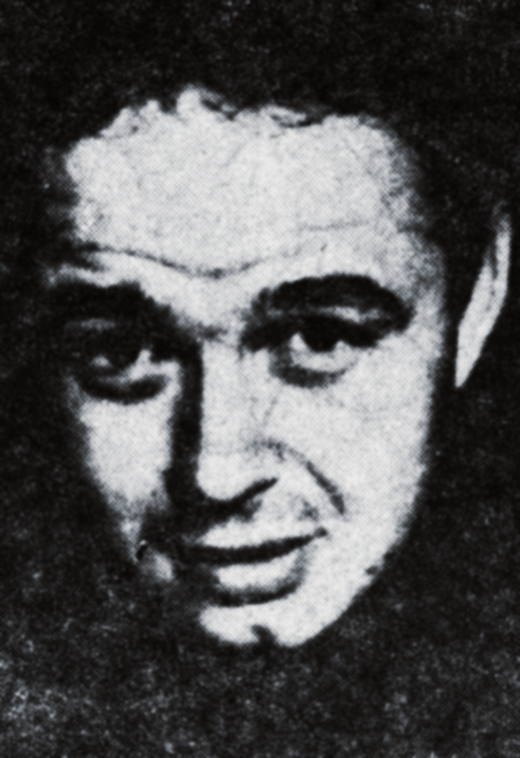
Emil Brumaru in 1970

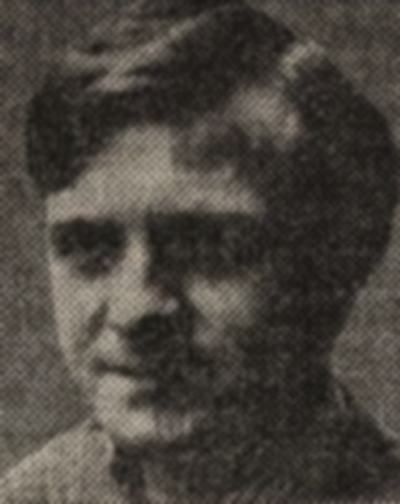
Dan Ciachir in 1981

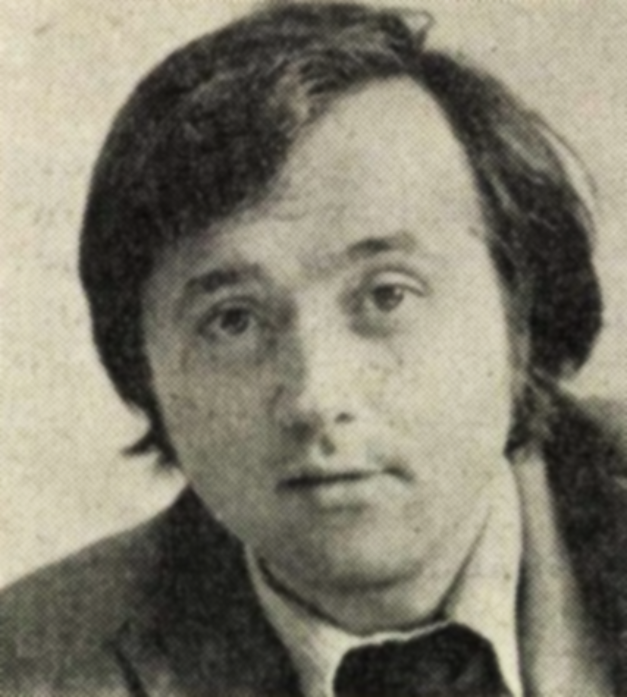
Ion Cristoiu in 1982

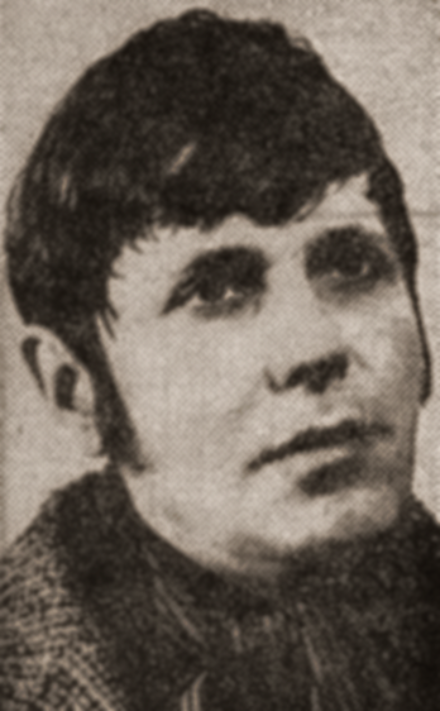
Gheorghe Grigurcu c. 1980

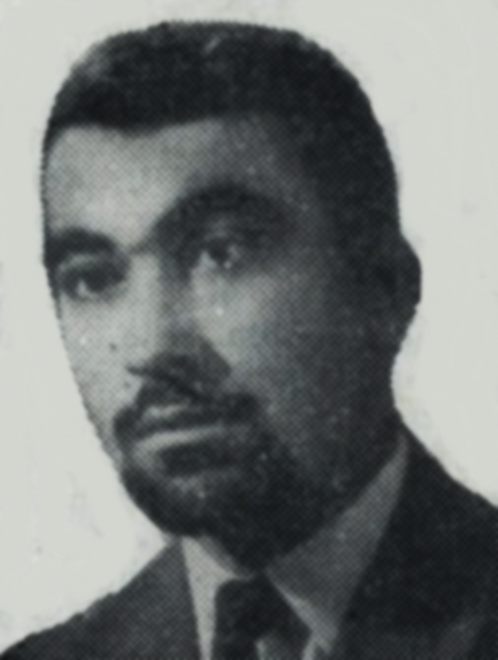
Mircea Iorgulescu in 1970

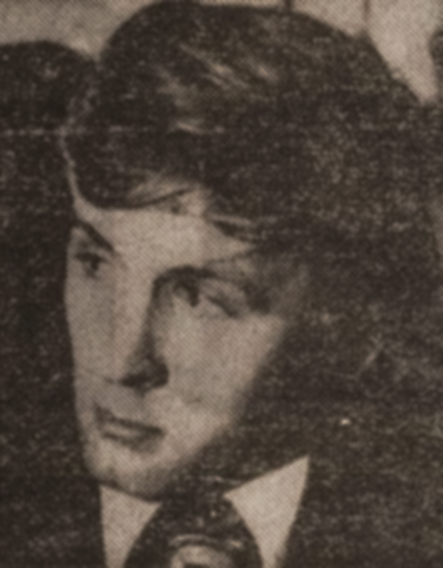
Cornel Nistorescu c. 1982

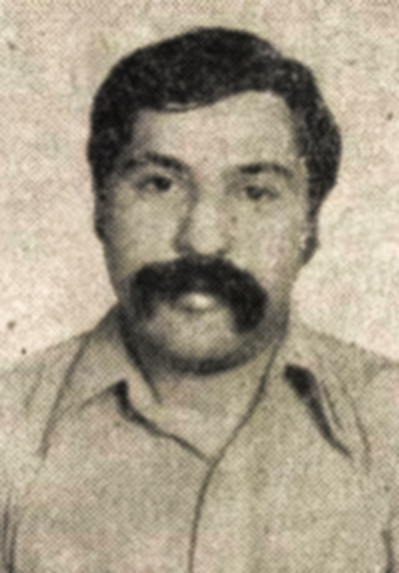
Artur Silvestri in 1983

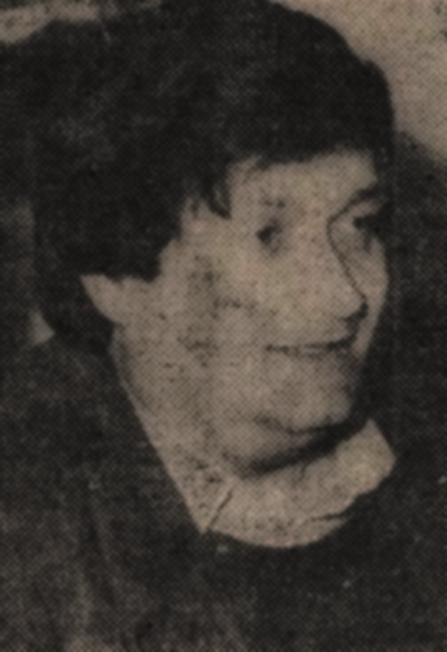
Alex. Ștefănescu in 1984

=== 1980s clampdown ===
Cristoiu's push for editorial independence was curbed in 1982, when the regime apparently ordered Scînteia Tineretului to feature content mostly endorsing Ceaușescu's personality cult and the PCR's national-communist dogmas (much space was now dedicated to the regime's talk of nuclear disarmament and world peace). Like all other mainline newspapers and magazines, it created a new wooden language of propaganda, which was both prolix and pompous. As Cristoiu later explained, this pattern reflected the journalists' need to satisfy Ceaușescu's appetite for encomiums by "say[ing] few things with loads of words" (since otherwise "there wasn't much new one could state each new day about the comrade [Ceaușescu]"); as a result of this, Cristoiu admits, much of his newspaper had become "unreadable". According to eyewitness reports, the photographers at Scînteia Tineretului had to present all images of Nicolae and Elena Ceaușescu for vetting by the PCR Central Committee, ahead of publication. This allowed for last-minute photograph manipulation, and also gave Scînteia an opportunity to confiscate and run the best frames. Meanwhile, the Securitate had consolidated its secret networks, and, in 1983, eight Scînteia Tineretului employees informed on the other 84 (the highest ratio at any Romanian newspaper of the day); four staff members were being kept under continuous surveillance. A lengthy controversy occurred in later decades over the informant named as "Coroiu", whom Vadim Tudor identified as being Cristoiu himself.

In October 1982, at Predeal, Scînteia Tineretului and the UTC hosted a meeting of "central youth newspapers" from all around the Eastern Bloc—with delegations sent by Junge Welt, Juventud Rebelde, Komsomolskaya Pravda, Magyar Ifjúság, Mladá Fronta, Narodna Mladezh, Smena, Sztandar Młodych, and Tiền Phong. The cultural pages were increasingly favorable toward vetted voices of national-communism, marking Barbu's return alongside Octavian, Ungheanu, Sabin Bălașa, Ion Coja, Ion Lăncrănjan, Valeriu Râpeanu, Dinu Săraru, and Dan Zamfirescu. Also featured therein, a collective interview by Ioan Adam, challenging "minor literature", was read by Bârna as a likely jibe at Cărtărescu and other Optzeciști authors. Taking the national-communist discourse into the realm of linguistic nationalism, SLAST was involved in a campaign against slang, seen by its contributors as a vehicle for the "degradation" or "pollution" of spoken Romanian. Various issues aired Lăncrănjan's polemic with Iorgulescu, Coja's put-down of poet Dorin Tudoran, and Grigurcu's disputes with Eugen Simion. The Optzeciști continued to be featured, but had to pay their own public tributes to the regime's newfound anti-Western sentiment—this was noted by literary historian Marian Victor Buciu in relation to one of Nedelciu's articles for SLAST, which mocked Radio Free Europe.

Bârna describes the newspaper's editorial line, after the 1982 push-back, as "hesitant". With occasional interventions by Ștefănescu, Scînteia Tineretului still reacted against the more aggressive forms of national-communism, as cultivated by Vadim Tudor in Săptămîna. Despite a pledge to publish only "socialist poetry", SLAST made occasional returns to pure or even cosmopolitan literature—hosting large portions of a novel by Stelian Tănase, and regular translations from various exponents of the Latin American Boom (beginning in 1982, with a conversation between Gabriel García Márquez and Plinio Apuleyo Mendoza). In later years, Cristoiu hosted texts seen by Bârna as having genuine literary value, including a serialized novel by Barbu and Cristoiu's own "ample documentary of literary history". The latter work was also the center of a national controversy, since it exposed the aesthetic compromises made by various authors during the age of Socialist Realism; according to Bârna, this exposure was tacitly endorsed by Ceaușescu's PCR, since it only referred to the Gheorghiu-Dej era.

The late 1980s witnessed a relative toning-down of national-communist propaganda, returning Scînteia Tineretului to a more aesthetically independent position. Bârna argues that there was an implicit tradeoff with the regime, in that the cultural supplement, while no longer fully politicized, also became "bland"—when Cristoiu left, his literary column was taken by Constantin Sorescu, and from November 1987 by Piru, both of whom generally ignored the "emergent values" and their cultural output. The newspaper focused its attention on other areas of society, including sports. It hired Horia Alexandrescu, whose exposes once resulted in a reshuffle at the Romanian Football Federation. Literary news were only provided occasionally, with on-and-off contributors such as Coșovei, Iorgulescu, Ștefănescu, Zalis, Dan-Silviu Boerescu, Mircea Martin, and Nicolae Tzone. A set of articles produced in 1987–1988 by Martin, Sorescu and Paul Nancă signaled another challenge to the official policies, giving praise to the Optzeciști and to the emergent "generation of 1990", while also introducing the reading public to the concept of a "postmodern literature".

Scînteia Tineretului engaged in celebrating Ceaușescu's 70th birthday on 24 January 1988, including by hosting a reportage about Elena Ceaușescu's visit to her in-laws' graves in Scornicești. Unlike Scînteia, which went on to celebrate the event for two more months, the UTC returned to regular content already on 27 January, when it featured instead a regular reportage piece about the paper mill of Letea Bacău (penned by Marina Almășan). In that context, the parent newspaper published an acrostic which was supposed to read CEAUȘESCU NICOLAE, but mistakenly omitted three lines, giving CEAUȘESCU O LAE (roughly: "Screw Ceaușescu"). In desperation, the newspaper was confiscated from all newsstands, though some copies were still distributed by unknowns; though it did not contain the poem, the parallel issue of Scînteia Tineretului was also withdrawn by overzealous officials. The Securitate reacted more promptly to later denunciations by its informants. In early January 1989, one such source sounded the alarm over an issue of Scînteia Tineretului which had incorrectly "altered photographs" of the PCR leadership, and had featured the names of party leaders in black border; all existing copies were withdrawn before sale, and the issue was corrected for print.

== Demise and posterity ==
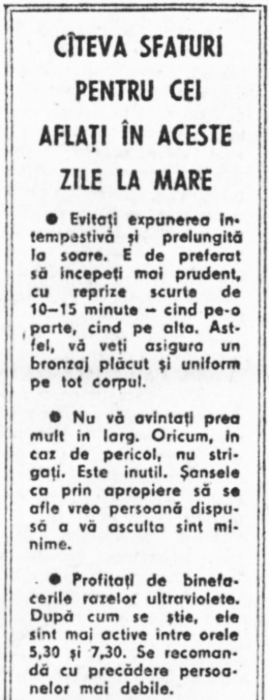
Facsimile of Cîteva sfaturi pentru cei aflați în aceste zile la mare, a mysterious text published by Scînteia Tineretului at the height of the Romanian Revolution

Scînteia Tineretului appears to have been used by the regime in its attempt to curtail the Romanian anti-communist uprising of December 1989. The case was made in 1996 by Șerban Săndulescu, who cited a mysterious announcement that ran in the newspaper on 18 December, containing "Some advice for those who are currently vacationing by the sea" (Cîteva sfaturi pentru cei aflați în aceste zile la mare), including warnings about sunburn; according to Săndulescu, this was a coded message for the Socialist Romanian Land Forces, instructing them to prepare for battle. Sorin Preda, who was a member of the editorial staff throughout the events, contrarily suggested that the piece was a purposeful joke; another journalist, Sorin Ovidiu Bălan, who had an article published in that same issue, was adamant that the "advice" had been printed by error.

The newspaper as such did not survive Ceaușescu's downfall—the UTC and its organ went down on 21 December. Also then, a pro-revolutionary newspaper, Tineretul Liber ("The Free Youth"), appeared in Bucharest, with much of the same editorial team. It is widely regarded as either a continuation of Scînteia Tineretului or only of the SLAST. Publishing some 1,28 million copies per issue in 1990, Tineretul Liber ranked as the third most read daily in Romania—after România Liberă and Adevărul; at the time, it was also fully supportive of the post-communist National Salvation Front and of its leader Ion Iliescu, and gave endorsement to the Mineriad counter-protests. It also took up the cause of Romanian nationalism upon covering the ethnic clashes of Târgu Mureș, with articles signed by Ioan Gavra (who was soon after recruited by the Romanian National Unity Party). Tineretul Liber had declared itself a publication for "authentic literature", assigning columns to Nedelciu, Tzone, Dan Stanca, and Cristian Tudor Popescu (alongside Piru and Ștefănescu, who were kept on). It took a retrospective stand against communist censorship, publishing an Optzeciști dossier, as well as Tudor Popescu's translation from one of Nikolai Berdyaev's anti-communist essays. Those years also witnessed a polemic over the defunct SLAST and its legacy: as one of the people attacked by the UTC press in the 1980s, Tudoran looked back on SLAST as an "invention of the Securitate and of Nicu Ceaușescu personally", and questioned the moral authority of people once associated with it (in particular Cristoiu and Ștefănescu, who presented themselves as anti-communists).

Tineretul Liber, which was owned by its writing staff, had initially resisted buyout offers from the investor and self-proclaimed Freemason Lucian Cornescu-Ring. Cornescu reports having divested after only "one or two" journalists agreed to sell; S. O. Bălan, who claims there were more sellers (including himself), also contends that they never received their money. Many staff members left to establish a rival daily, Curierul Național, before the close of 1990.

In early 1992, Tineretul Liber had fully switched sides in matters of internal politics, favoring the right-leaning opposition movement over both the Democratic National Salvation Front and the National Salvation Front Party; in July 1993, it fought against the Văcăroiu Cabinet, announcing that it would suspend its coverage of government activities. Between those dates, it had experienced a rapid decline in readership. The brand was eventually purchased by businessman George Pădure, who called in Ilie Șerbănescu as the new editor-in-chief. This failed to increase revenues, even after Cristoiu and Monica Zvirjinschi were brought in to replace Șerbănescu. In April 1995, after a lingering conflict between Pădure and his employees, Tineretul Liber went out of business altogether.
