= Robert Turcescu =

Romanian journalist

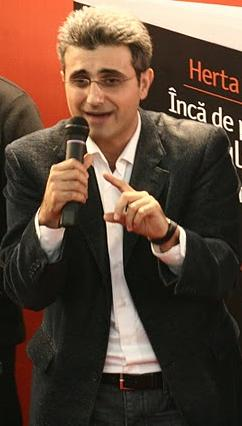
- Turcescu in 2009

Member of the Chamber of Deputies
- In office 20 December 2016 – 20 December 2020
- Constituency: Constanța County

Personal details
- Born: 3 May 1975 (age 51) Pitești, Romania
- Party: People's Movement Party (2016–2020); European People's Party (2016–2020)
- Education: University of Bucharest
- Occupation: Journalist; politician
- Television: Realitatea TV

Robert Turcescu
- Notable work: Pop Rock & Show, Curierul Național (National Courier), (1993); A-M. Press (Reporter), (1994); Radio Total (Total Radio) (Reporter), (1996–1998); Europa FM (editor) (2000); TVR Telematinal (Morning TV show) (Presenter, 2001); 100%(Host, 2003–present); Magazine Dilema (Dilemma) (Contributor, 2003–present); România în direct (Romania live) (Media proprietor, 2000–present)

Comedy career
- Years active: 1993–present
- Medium: Television, radio, internet, music, press
- Subjects: Mass media/news media/Media criticism, music, Romanian politics, current events, religion, race relations,
- Website: www.turcescu.ro

Robert Turcescu (born May 3, 1975) is a Romanian journalist, politician, TV presenter, media critic, radio personality, and singer-songwriter.

== Early life and education ==
Born in Pitești, he attended the Ion Brătianu High School there, followed by the Superior School of Journalism in Bucharest, which he finished in 1997. The following year, he graduated from the University of Bucharest's Faculty of Journalism and Communication Sciences.

He was chosen by Walt Disney Pictures to dub the radio announcer's voice in the Pixar short – Day & Night.

== Journalism ==
Turcescu began his career in 1993 as a writer for the magazine Pop Rock & Show and for the newspaper Curierul Național. The following year, the news agency A-M. Press hired him as a reporter. From 1996 to 1998, he worked as a reporter for Radio Total, advancing to editor-in-chief that year. In 2000, he became editor-in-chief at Europa FM, and since that year he has hosted the show România în direct there. In 2001 he was a presenter for TVR's Telematinal and an editor at Evenimentul Zilei. Since 2003 he has written for the magazine Dilema. He hosted 100% on Realitatea TV from that year until 2010. He has continued hosting his show at B1 TV starting with the end of September 2010. He was also editor-in-chief of Cotidianul in 2004–2005.

He was the host of 100%, a political one-to-one talk-show that aired on Realitatea TV and B1 TV. He participated in the Eurovision Song Contest 2013 with the song Un refren. In 2021 he returned to Evenimentul Zilei, and from 2022 to 2023 he moderated the show Sub semnul întrebării at B1 TV. At the beginning of 2023 he left the television network to launch his Evz-Play podcast on YouTube.

=== Awards ===
He has received a number of awards. For instance, in 2002 the National Audiovisual Council named România în direct the best radio talk show, while in 2004, the Association of Television Professionals granted 100% an award for best television talk show.

== Undercover agent ==
Turcescu is best known for confessing in 2014 to being an undercover agent of a military secret service in Romania while posing as a freelance journalist for several years, thus raising concerns about the penetration of the secret security services in the media sector of Romania. His military rank was that of a lieutenant colonel.

== Politics ==
In the Romanian local elections of 2016, Turcescu ran for mayor of Bucharest, supported by the People's Movement Party (PMP); he subsequently placed 4th, with 6.46% of the votes. Afterwards, he became PMP's vice-president and ad interim president of the Bucharest branch. Turcescu eventually won a seat in the Chamber of Deputies on PMP's party list in the wake of the 2016 legislative elections.
