= Nine O'Clock (disambiguation) =

Nine O'Clock is a Romanian English-language newspaper.

Nine O'Clock may also refer to:

- Nine O'Clock News (disambiguation), several television programs
- Nine O'Clock Service, a youth-orientated alternative Christian worship service in England (1986–1995)
- A Nine O'Clock Town, a 1918 American comedy silent film
- 9 O'Clock Gun, a cannon located in Vancouver, British Columbia, Canada
