= Scripta =

Scripta may stand for:

- Jussi Halla-aho's Finnish-language blog Scripta
- The owner of Hungarian-language Romanian newspaper Új Magyar Szó

Other Scriptas:

- Scripta continua a.k.a. word divider
- Scripta Mathematica, quarterly journal published by Yeshiva University devoted to the philosophy, history, and expository treatment of mathematics
