= Ion Cristoiu =

Romanian journalist (born 1948)

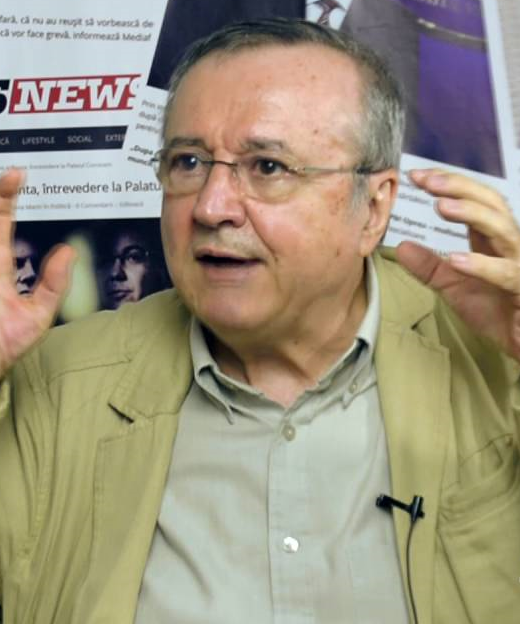
Ion Cristoiu in 2016

Ion Cristoiu (Romanian pronunciation: [iˈon krisˈtoju]; born 16 November 1948, Găgești, Vrancea County) is a conservative Romanian journalist, writer, and political analyst.

== Career ==
He was editor-in-chief of the daily Evenimentul Zilei during its heyday in the 1990s, when the average daily circulation topped 600,000, making it the most read newspaper in Romania, after România liberă (circulation 1 million) and one of the most read in Eastern Europe as well. He also founded or played a major role at a number of the weekly publications during that era: Expres, Expres Magazin, and Zig-Zag. All these publications were highly critical of president Ion Iliescu.

He was also the anchor for the TV talk-show "Ultimul cuvânt" (The Last Word) for the Romanian private TV station B1 TV.

== Controversies ==
Cristoiu is considered by some as a controversial figure in the Romanian public due to his alleged involvement as informant of the Securitate (Communist Romania's secret police). These allegations were never proven. Romanian Senator Corneliu Vadim Tudor in 2008 alleged publicly that Cristoiu "was more than the caster, he was a source". The senator declared that Cristoiu snitched on him to the Securitate under the code name "Coroiu". Vadim said that this results from a tab of his Securitate file at the National Council for the Study of the Securitate Archives. Cristoiu is not on that list, so he doesn't have an index number as a collaborator.

Mădălin Hodor, a Romanian historian and researcher, gave an interview to the Newsweek Romania magazine in 2018, in which he spoke about the fact that the journalist is mentioned in documents from the archives of the former Securitate, as the "Coroiu" source. But Cristoiu won the case in court.

According to The National Council for the Study of the Securitate Archives, Ion Cristoiu appears in the database both in the index of collaborators, in the Foreign Intelligence Service (SIE) file 41448, and in the Index of follow-ups, twice, as a writer, with a conspiratorial name TO "Coroiu", 1987, and as deputy editor-in-chief of Scânteia Tineretului, for the attention of SMB (Bucharest City Securitate), 1983, 1984 This is a list that can be updated, and Cristoiu is not on that list now.

The historian Marius Oprea confirmed the authenticity of the list published in Revista 22, but drew attention to the fact that the respective document represented a simple work list of the Securitate, which means that not all those who appear there were actually collaborators. The documents were never made public.
