= Iosif Sava =

Romanian musicologist and host

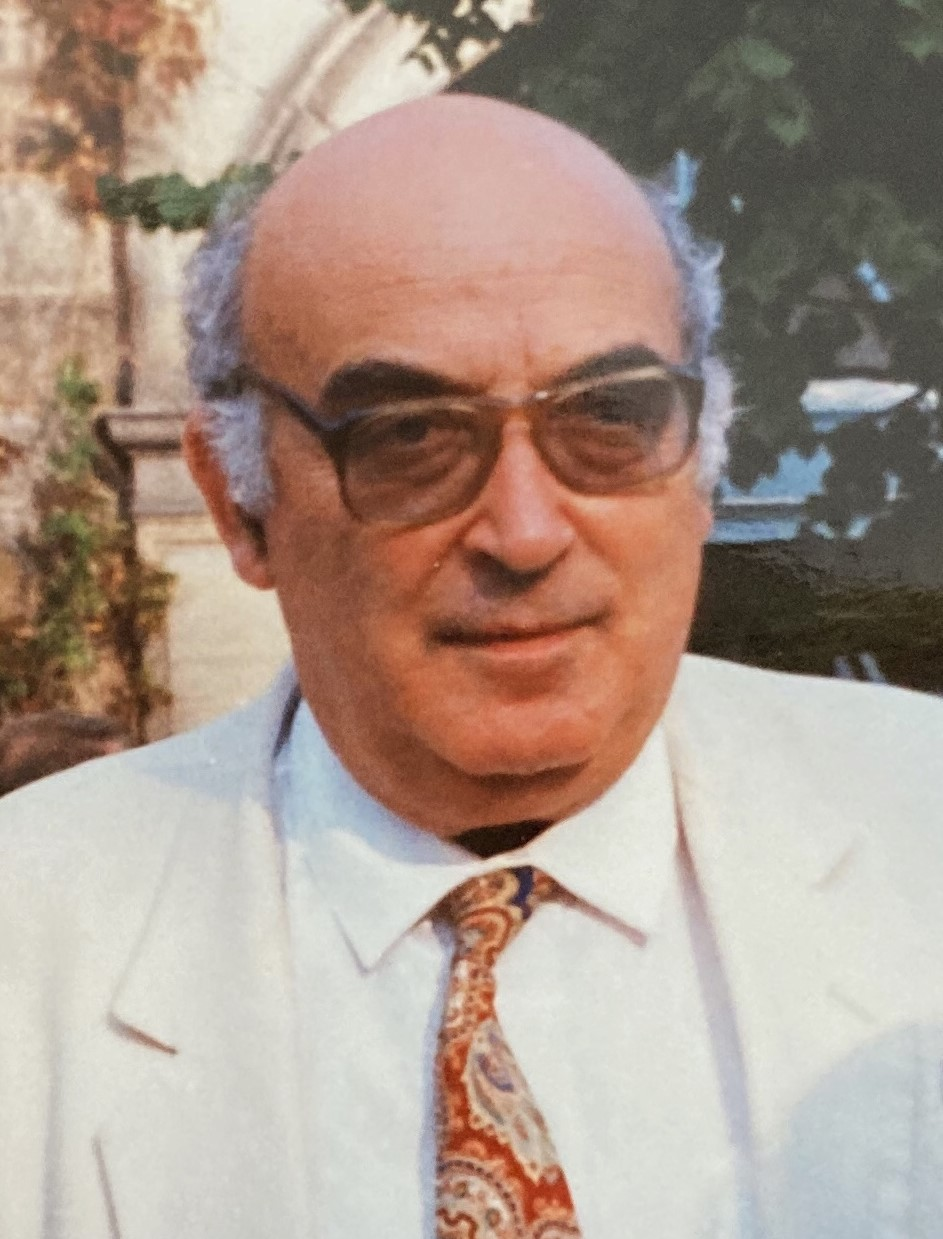
- Iosif Sava - 1990
- Born: Iosef Segal; 15 February 1933; Iași, Romania
- Died: 18 August 1998 (aged 65); Bucharest, Romania
- Resting place: Filantropia Israelite Cemetery in Bucharest
- Occupations: Musicologist, television personality

Iosif Sava-Segal (b. Iosef Segal; 15 February 1933, Iași, Romania - d. 18 August 1998, Bucharest, Romania), known as Iosif Sava, was a Romanian musicologist and pianist. He was particularly renowned for his decades-long live radio and television shows during which he invited famous personalities from different realms of Romanian culture to discuss their perspectives of the cultural phenomenon.

== Early life and education ==
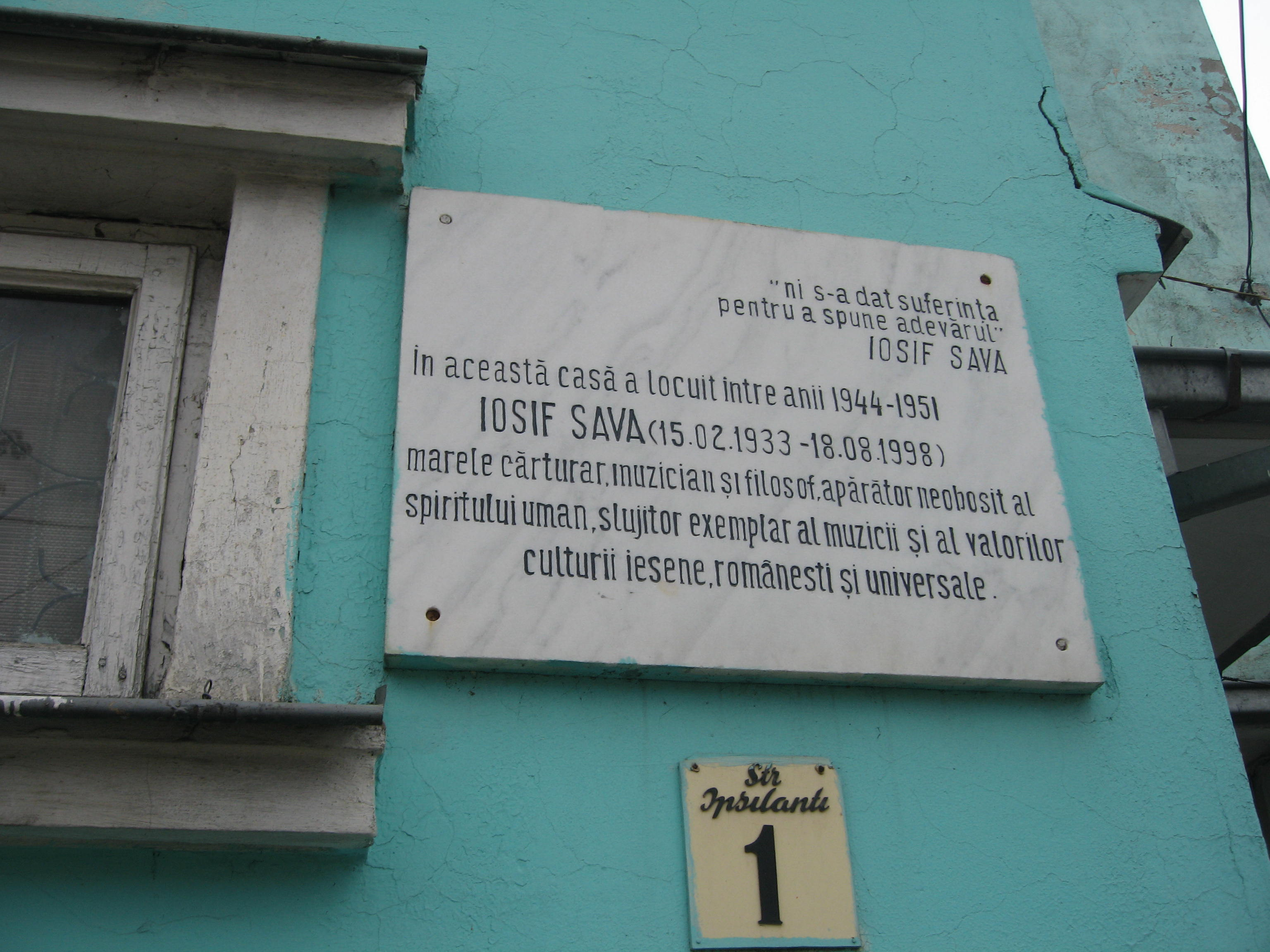
Commemorative plaque placed on Iosif Sava's house in Iași

Iosif Sava came from a Jewish family with a centuries-long musical tradition. His father, Bernard (1897–1958), was a longstanding violist the Iasi Philharmonic and a composer and arranger for the State Jewish Theater. His grandfather, Iosef (1868–1927), was a violinist and a collaborator of both Avrom Goldfadn, the founder of the Yiddish theater, and of Gavriil Musicescu. His great-grandfather was among the first graduates of the Iași Conservatory founded in 1860.

Sava graduated from the Iasi National College in 1951 and studied Philosophy at Bucharest University, obtaining his degree in 1955. He concurrently pursued his musical studies, first at the Conservatory and the Arts High School in Iași (1944-1951) and later at the National University of Music Bucharest (1962-1966)

== Journalist ==
He became interested in journalism while in high school, collaborating at local newspapers ("Opinia"/ "The Opinion") in Iași. Once in Bucharest, he joined the staff of the daily Scînteia Tineretului where he worked for 16 years. At least initially, his writing encompassed not only classical music reviews but also articles aimed at popularizing science. It was during this time - in the 1950s, at the height of communism - that he was advised to change his name from Iosef Segal to something that sounded more authentically native. In response, he randomly chose the pen name Iosif Sava and the official name Iosif Sava-Segal, not wanting to give up the name of his Levite ancestors. Throughout his career, he continued to contribute hundreds of essays and reviews to multiple Romanian newspapers and periodicals.

== Radio ==
In 1972, Iosif Sava started (for the first couple of years with co-host Teodora Albescu) a weekly talk-show on the Romanian Radio entitled "Invitațiile Euterpei"/ "Euterpe’s Invitations", that continued to air until his untimely death. The goal was to bring classical music into everyone's home, with topics ranging from Monteverdi's oeuvre to analyses of Mahler's symphonies and from great centers of classical music to famous interpreters' recordings.

== Tv ==
In 1980 he started working in television, producing a weekly - "Musical Soirée" - on TVR's second channel. The live show was taken off the air in 1985 and resumed only in 1990 after the downfall of Nicolae Ceaușescu. The "Musical Soirée" served as a discussion forum featuring representative figures of the Romanian intelligentsia. It provided them with a platform to address not only issues related to their own body of work and their relationship to music, but also to engage in discussions about cultural policies and other timely matters. Many noteworthy intellectuals of the younger generation were introduced to the general public through Sava's show. Additionally, always eager to identify and promote talented young performers, he featured several fresh musical interpreters on each show.

In early 1998, Iosif Sava, who was then also the editor-in-chief of the TVR cultural newsroom, was removed from Romanian television under the pretext of mandatory retirement rules. The highly successful 'Musical Soirée' was abruptly interrupted. Despite his bitterness, he embarked on a new venture, producing a show called 'Home Music Salon - Sava's List' on Pro TV. Unfortunately, it was short-lived due to his untimely death.

== Interpreter ==
Sava firmly believed that one cannot write about music without practical experience as an interpreter. Starting in 1974, he collaborated with Romanian soloists and chamber ensembles such as "Musica Rediviva", "Quodlibet Musicum", and "Consortium Violae", serving as a pianist, harpsichordist, or organist in numerous concerts throughout Romania and Europe. These collaborations eventually resulted in several recordings.

== Published books ==
Sava published more than 70 books, whether alone or in collaboration, including musical encyclopedic dictionaries, works aimed at making classical music more accessible to a broader audience, biographies, dialogues with Romanian personalities (some of whom appeared on his radio or TV talk shows), and several volumes of memoirs. A selected list appears below:

- 1971 - Ghid de operă, with Gabriela Constantinescu, Daniela Caraman Fotea, Grigore Constantinescu, București, Editura Muzicală.a Uniunii Compozitorilor.
- 1973 - Ghid de balet, with Daniela Caraman Fotea, Grigore Constantinescu, București, Editura Muzicală.
- 1976 - Silvia Șerbescu: Ghid biografic, with Liana Șerbescu, București, Editura Muzicală.
- 1979 - Dicționar de muzică, with Luminița Vartolomei, București, Editura Științifică și Enciclopedică.
- 1980 - Teritorii muzicale românești: dialoguri, evocări, București, Editura Muzicală.
- 1982 - Amintirile muzicienilor români: dialoguri evocări, confesiuni, București, Editura Muzicală.
- 1983 - Istoria muzicii universale în date, în colaborare cu Petru Rusu, București, Editura Muzicală.
- 1984 - Iubiți muzica secolului XX: fișe, eseuri, conspecte, București. Editura Albatros
- 1984 - Idealurile lui George Enescu. Șase decenii pe estrada Ateneului: amintiri în colocviu - Vol. 1/ Alexandru Rădulescu, Iosif Sava, București, Editura Muzicală.
- 1985 - Dirijori români. Șase decenii pe estrada Ateneului: amintiri în colocviu - Vol. 2/ Alexandru Rădulescu, Iosif Sava, București, Editura Muzicală.
- 1985 - Polifoniile unei vieți. Arta Florescu în dialog cu Iosif Sava Vol. 1, București, Editura Muzicală.
- 1985 - Bucuriile muzicii: fișe, eseuri, conspecte, București, Editura Muzicală.
- 1986 - Prietenii muzicii, București, Albatros.
- 1986 - Patima muzicii / David Ohanesian, Iosif Sava, București, Editura Muzicală.
- 1986 - Muzică și literatură: scriitori români. Vol. 1./ Zoe Dumitrescu Bușulenga, Iosif Sava, București, Cartea Românească.
- 1987 - Muzică și literatură: scriitori români. Vol. 2./ Zoe Dumitrescu Bușulenga, Iosif Sava, București, Cartea Românească.
- 1987 - Muzicienii Iașului/ George Pascu, Iosif Sava, București, Editura Muzicală.
- 1987 - Contrapunct liric. Arta Florescu în dialog cu Iosif Sava Vol. 2, București, Editura Muzicală.
- 1987 - 1001 audiții: fișe, conspecte, eseuri, București, Editura Muzicală.
- 1987 - Euterpe vinzesban, București, Editura Kriterion.
- 1988 - Constelația Madrigal. Marin Constantin în dialog cu Iosif Sava, Ediția I, București, Editura Muzicală
- 1989 - Cu Ludovic Spiess prin teatrele lirice ale lumii, București, Editura Muzicală.
- 1989 - Eminescu și muzica/ Zoe Dumitrescu Bușulenga, Iosif Sava, București, Editura Muzicală.
- 1989 - Scrisori/ Constanța Erbiceanu. Vol. I; ediție îngrijită și comentată de Iosif Sava, București, Editura Muzicală.
- 1990 - Sonorități americane: Jurnal, București, Editura Muzicală.
- 1991 - Ștefan Niculescu și galaxiile muzicale ale secolului XX, București, Editura Muzicală a Uniunii Compozitorilor și Muzicienilor din România.
- 1991 - Orga lui Iosif Gerstenengst, București, Arhiepiscopia Romano-Catolică.
- 1992 - Scrisori / Constanța Erbiceanu. Vol. II; ediție îngrijită și comentată de Iosif Sava, București, Editura Muzicală.
- 1992 - Și marii muzicieni au fost copii. Vol. 1, with Ana Maria Urlea, București, Editura Ion Creangă.
- 1992 - Eugenia Moldoveanu și vocile veacului, București, Editura Romfel.
- 1992 - Jurnal muzical german, București, Editura Romfel.
- 1992 - Fundația Brambach și talentul muzical românesc, București, Editura Excelsior.
- 1993 - Itinerare muzicale, București, Editura Libra.
- 1993 - Muzică și muzicieni, with Luminița Vartolomei, București, Romfel.
- 1993 - Constelația Madrigal. Marin Constantin în dialog cu Iosif Sava, Ediția a II-a, București, Editura Muzicală.
- 1994 - Muzică și literatură: scriitori români. Vol. 3./ Zoe Dumitrescu Bușulenga, Iosif Sava, București, Cartea Românească.
- 1994 - Jurnal pe portative. Vol. 1: (31 octombrie 1989 - 1 aprilie 1990), București, Editura Roza Vânturilor.
- 1995 - Dosare muzicale. Jurnal pe portative: (5 septembrie 1991 - 15 februarie 1992), București, Editura Expansion-Armonia.
- 1995 - Muzica în zgomotul lumii: (8 martie 1991 - 4 septembrie 1991), București, Editura Du Style.
- 1995 - Seismograf muzical. (3 august 1992 - 20 februarie 1993), București, Editura Albatros.
- 1995 - Muzica la sfârșitul mileniului: (4 august 1994 - 13 februarie 1995), București, Editura Info-Team.
- 1995 - Muzicieni evrei, Ottawa, Editura Badian
- 1995 - Muzicienii lui Marconi. Vol. I, București, Editura Scripta.
- 1995 - Muzicieni evrei de la noi și din lume. Vol. 1 : Muzicanții pe acoperiș, București, Editura Hasefer.
- 1996 - Majestatea Sa...Muzica: Jurnal: (14 februarie 1995 - 18 septembrie 1995), București, Holding Reporter.
- 1996 - Simfonia destinului. Personalități românești la Seratele muzicale (Vol. I - cu Ion Cristoiu, Dinu C. Giurescu, Ioan Grigorescu, Ion Iliescu, Dan Amedeo Lăzărescu, Gabriel Liiceanu, Cristian Mandeal, Nicolae Manolescu, Radu Palade, Al. Paleologu, Mihai Sora, Diana Turconi, Doina Uricariu, București, Editura Integral
- 1996 - Personalități românești la Seratele muzicale; Vol. II - cu Mircea Albulescu, Călin Anastasiu, Șt. Aug. Doinaș, Mircea Dinescu, Caius T. Dragomir, Anca Harasim, Ion Ianoși, Mircea Iorgulescu, H.-R. Patapievici, Adrian Păunescu, Andrei Pippidi, Alin Teodorescu, Răzvan Theodorescu), București: Editura Integral,
- 1996 - Radiografii muzicale: 6 Serate TV cu Horia-Roman Patapievici, Octavian Paler, Nicolae Breban, Aurel Stroe, Nicolae Constantin Munteanu, George Pruteanu, Iași, Polirom.
- 1997 - Invitații Eutherpei: 8 serate TV cu Alexandru Zub, Alexandru Paleologu, Dorin Tudoran, Mircea Dinescu, Ana Blandiana, Alina Mungiu, Gheorghe Buzatu, Florin Constantiniu, Ion Cristoiu, Cristian Popișteanu, Mircea Suciu, Stelian Tănase, Andrei Pleșu, Vladimir Tismăneanu, Mircea Mihăieș, Iași, Polirom.
- 1997 - Muzică...bine temperată: jurnal pe portative: (2 aprilie 1990 - 4 septembrie 1990), cu o prefață de Elena Zottoviceanu, București, Universal Dalsi.
- 1997 - Orizonturi muzicale: muzica noastră cea de toate zilele: jurnal 27 august 1993 - 15 ianuarie 1994, Craiova, Scrisul Românesc.
- 1997 - Poli(tico)fonii - Jurnal (17 iunie 1996 - 27 februarie 1997), Iași, Polirom.
- 1997 - Mică enciclopedie muzicală, în colaborare cu Luminița Vartolomei, Craiova, Aius.
- 1997 - Dublu recital - Nicolae Cajal - Iosif Sava. Caietele culturale, București, Realitatea evreiască.
- 1997 - Muzicieni evrei de la noi și din lume. Vol. 2 : Variațiuni pe o temă de Chagall, București, Editura Hasefer.
- 1998 - Muzicieni evrei de la noi și din lume. Vol. 3 : Harpiștii Regelui David, București, Editura Hasefer.
- 1998 - Lista lui Sava. Personalități românești la Seratele muzicale (Vol. I și II), București, Editura Du Style.
- 1998 - Muzica și spectacolul lumii: 10 Serate TV cu Mihai Șora, Sergiu Celibidache, Radu Palade, Alexandru Paleologu, Dan Grigore, Andrei Șerban, Cristian Tudor Popescu, Dan Setlacec, Iași, Polirom.
- 1998 - Claviaturile timpului: jurnal pe portative: (19 septembrie 1995 - 15 iunie 1996), Iași, Polirom.
- 1998 - Muzică și politică: pagini din “Jurnalul pe portative”: (1 martie 1997 - 20 septembrie 1997), Craiova, Aius.
- 1998 - Ultimul jurnal pe portative: socio-solfegii (21 septembrie 1997 - 6 marie 1998); dicteuri paramuzicale (7 martie 1998 - 10 iulie 1998), București, Editura Muzicală a Uniunii Compozitorilor și Muzicienilor din România.
- 2001 - Ecranele vieții muzicale: însemnări din cotidian (16 februarie 1992 - 1 august 1992), București, Paidea.
- 2003 - Muzica sub reflectoare: pagini de jurnal: 2 martie 1993 - 26 august 1993, cu o prefață de Doina Uricariu, București, Editura Du Style.

== Awards ==
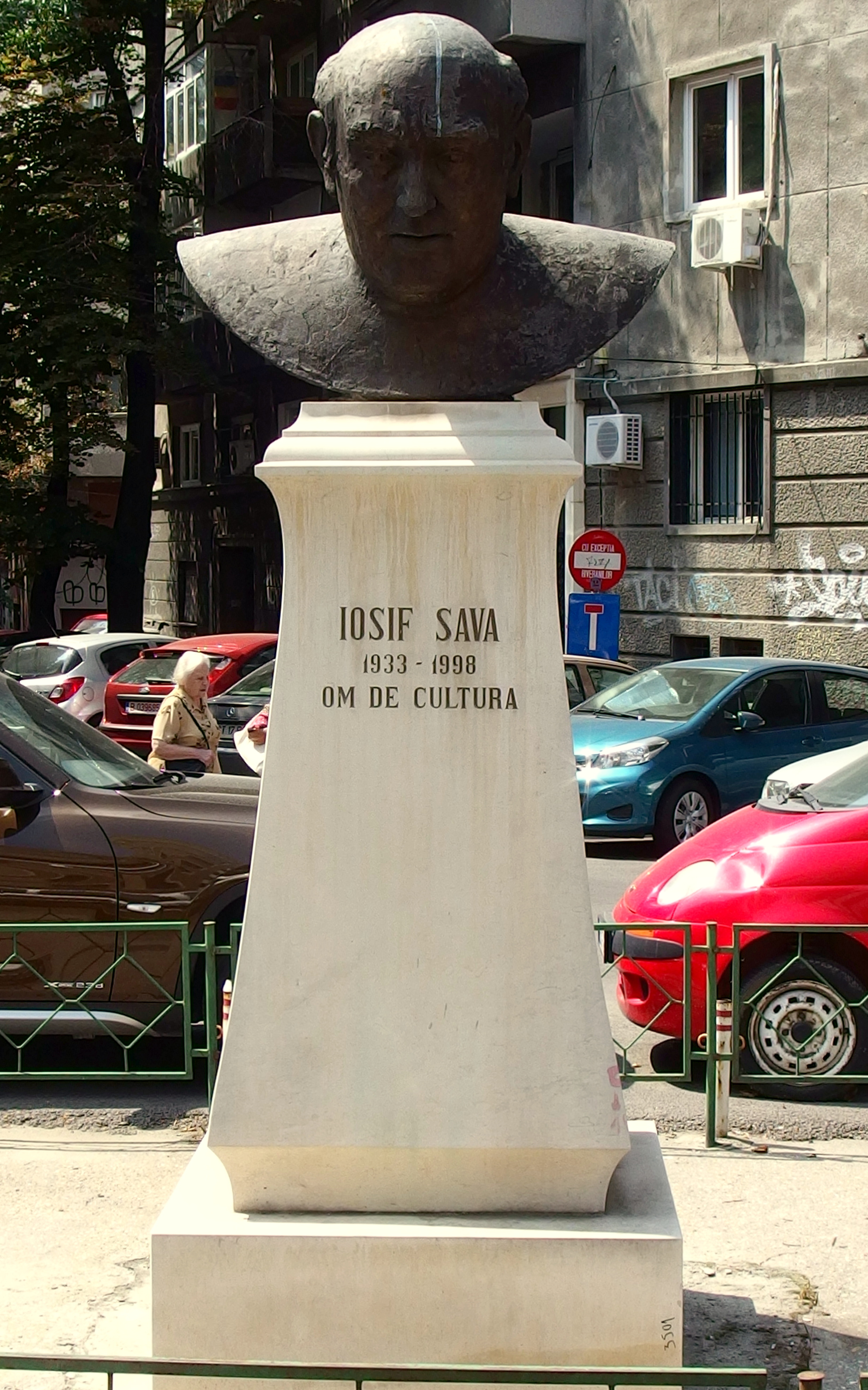
Iosif Sava's bust placed in the square bearing his name

A member of the Union of Composers and Musicologists of Romania (UCMR) since 1972, he has been awarded six UCMR prizes over time. Additionally, he has been honored with the Romanian Academy Prize, four prizes of the Association of Television Professionals of Romania, the Prize of the College of Music Critics (1980); the prize of the „Actualitatea Muzicală (Musical Actuality)” magazine.

== Posterity ==
In 2005, the School of Music and Fine Arts No. 1 in Bucharest, initially established in 1959, has been named "Iosif Sava" in honor of its legacy. The school organizes an annual national competition for young musicians bearing the "Iosif Sava" name spanning three categories: essay. individual instruments, and chamber music.

Since September 1998, the ACCUMM Foundation, founded by the writer and filmmaker Petru Maier Bianu (September 2, 1947 - August 22, 2011), has been organizing the "Iosif Sava" Music Season, hosted by the Museum of Bucharest at the Șuțu Palace

Iosif Sava's name was given to a small square near the National University of Music in Bucharest, where his bust has been erected.

The "Musical Soirée" series has been reprised multiple times on Romanian Television as the discussions between Sava and his guests continued to remain relevant for successive generations of viewers. Several of Sava's "Soirées" have been uploaded to YouTube in order to make them widely accessible.
