= Șirineasa =

- Commune
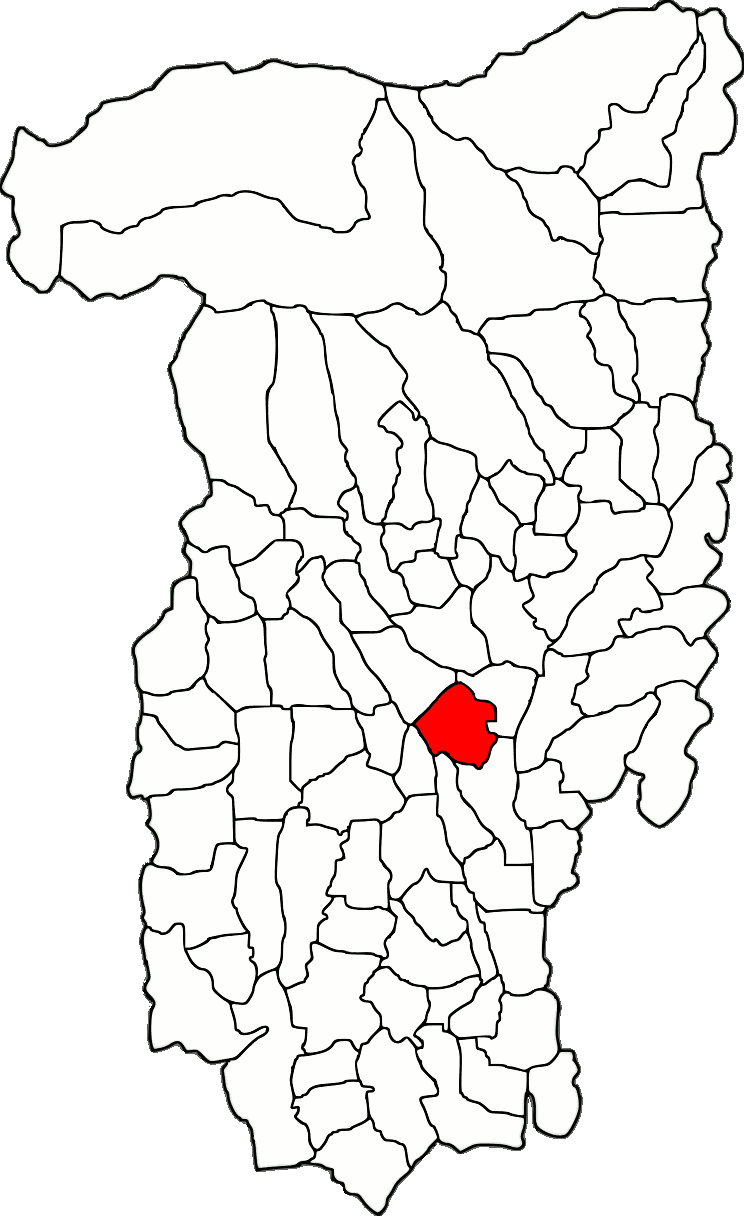
- Location in Vâlcea County

- Location in Romania
- Coordinates: 44°56′N 24°12′E
- Country: Romania
- County: Vâlcea
- Area: 46.96 km^{2} (18.13 sq mi)
- Population (2021-12-01): 2,099
  - Density: 44.70/km^{2} (115.8/sq mi)
- Time zone: UTC+02:00 (EET)
  - Summer (DST): UTC+03:00 (EEST)
- Vehicle reg.: VL

Șirineasa is a commune in Vâlcea County, Oltenia, western Wallachia, Romania.

== Administration ==
Șirineasa is composed of 5 villages. The largest village is Ciorăști, situated in the northern part of the commune. The other villages are Aricioaia, Șirineasa, Slăvitești and Valea Alunișului.

== Population ==
The population of Șirineasa was 2,612 in 2002. At the census that year, every inhabitant was a Romanian, and all but 4 were Romanian Orthodox.

== Rivers and lakes ==
Șirineasa is traversed by Luncavăț River and Firijba River. A small part near Târgu Olt is traversed by Olt River. There is also Niș (from Aluniș) brook traversing the Valley of Niș (Valea Nișului). In the forest, there was "The Lake without bottom" (Lacul fără fund). A legend says that Nicolae Gheorghe Asproiu (19th century), followed by police, drop the cartful with gold in this lake, in order to retrieve it after he is safe. Scientifically, the lake has a twin lake in Sibiu County, Transylvania, under the Carpathian Alps.

== Tourism ==
Tourists can visit "The Beech" from "Cold Well". It is over 300 years old. There were the ruins of Oromului Church, build between 1751 during the rule of Ioan Grigore Voievod; the church is closed because it is under restoration.

== Natives ==
- George Țărnea, poet

== Gallery ==
Oltenian Style House from Ciorăști

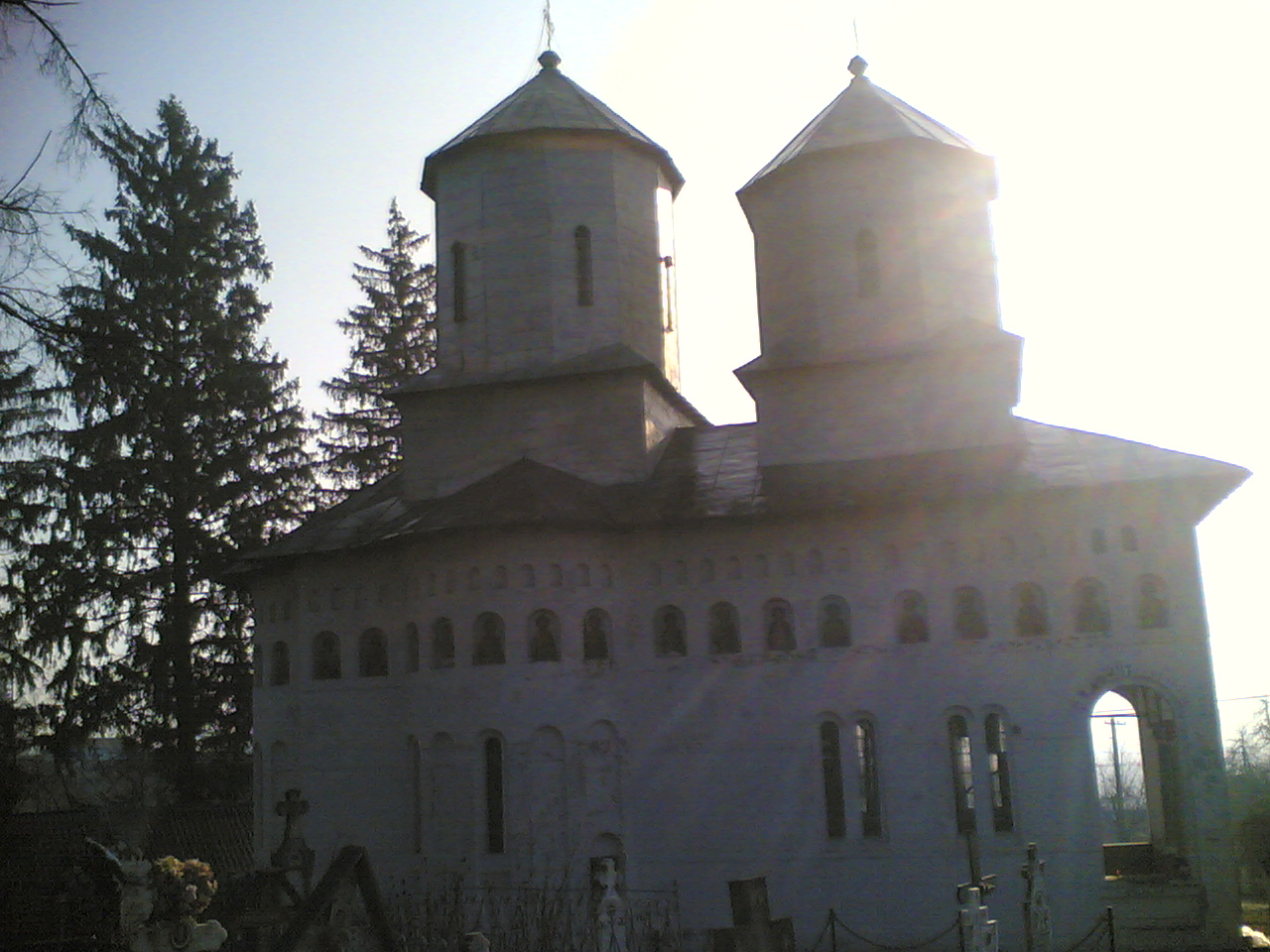
Orthodox Church from Ciorăști

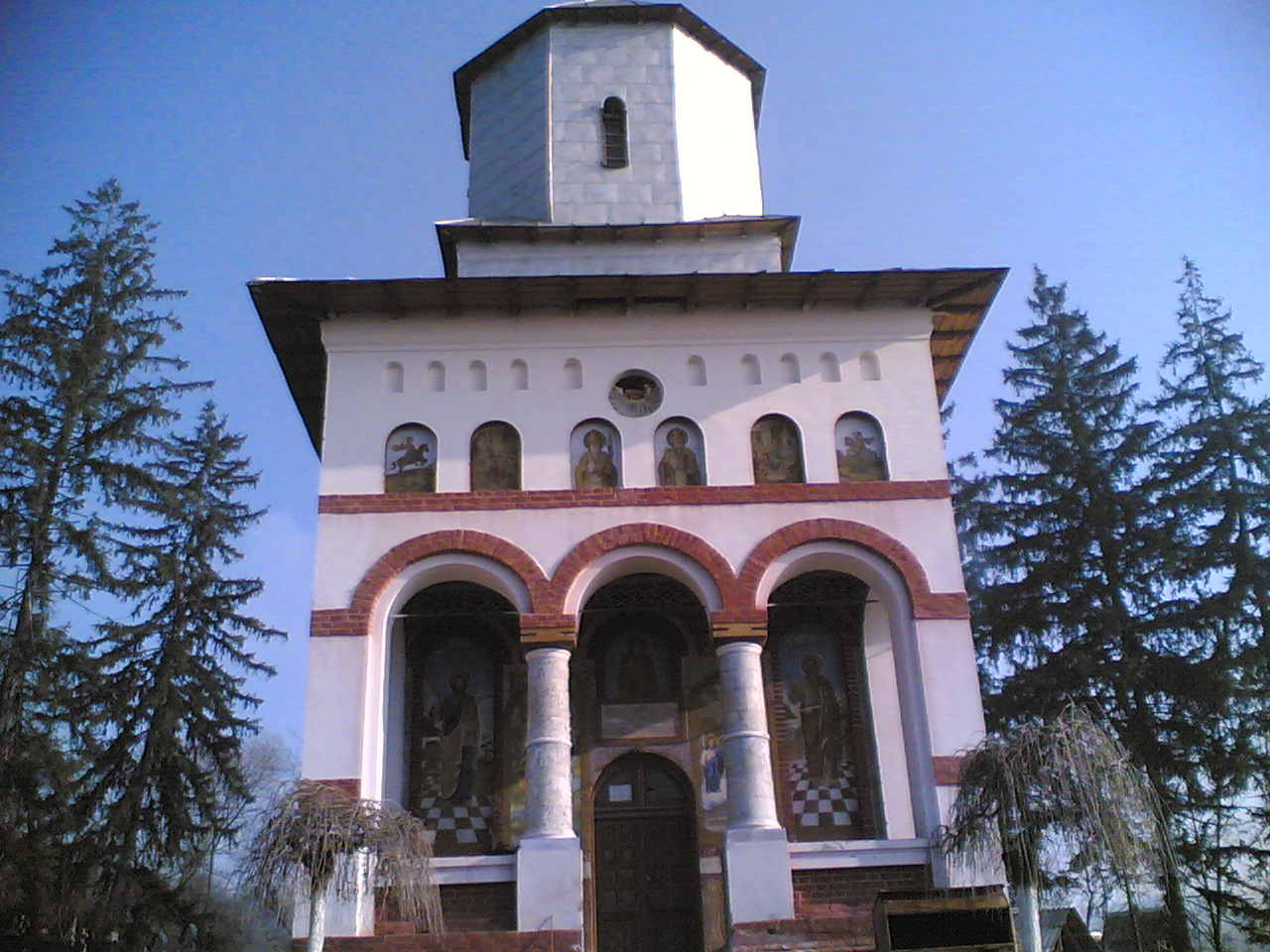
Main view of the Church

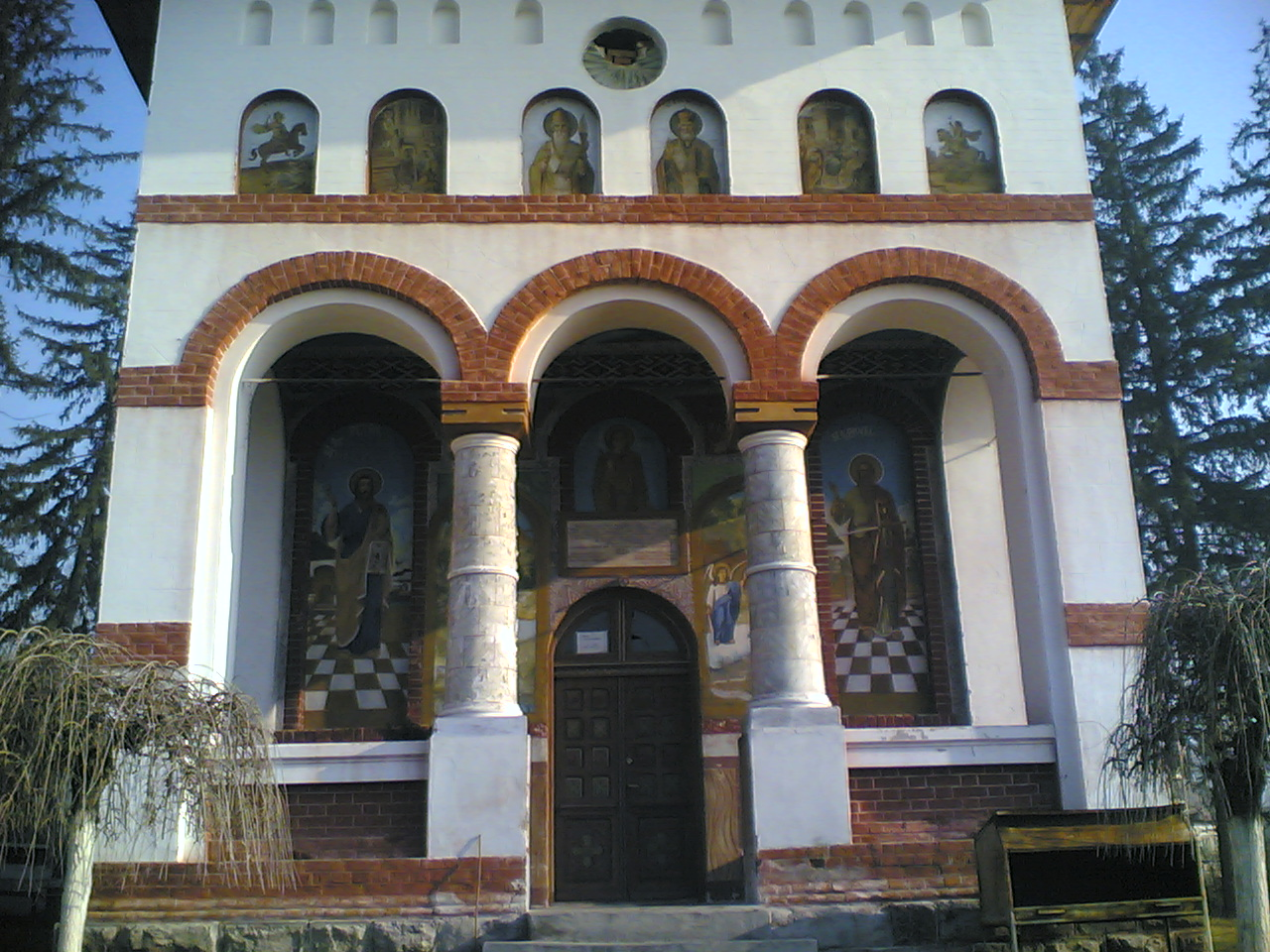
The entrance of the Church

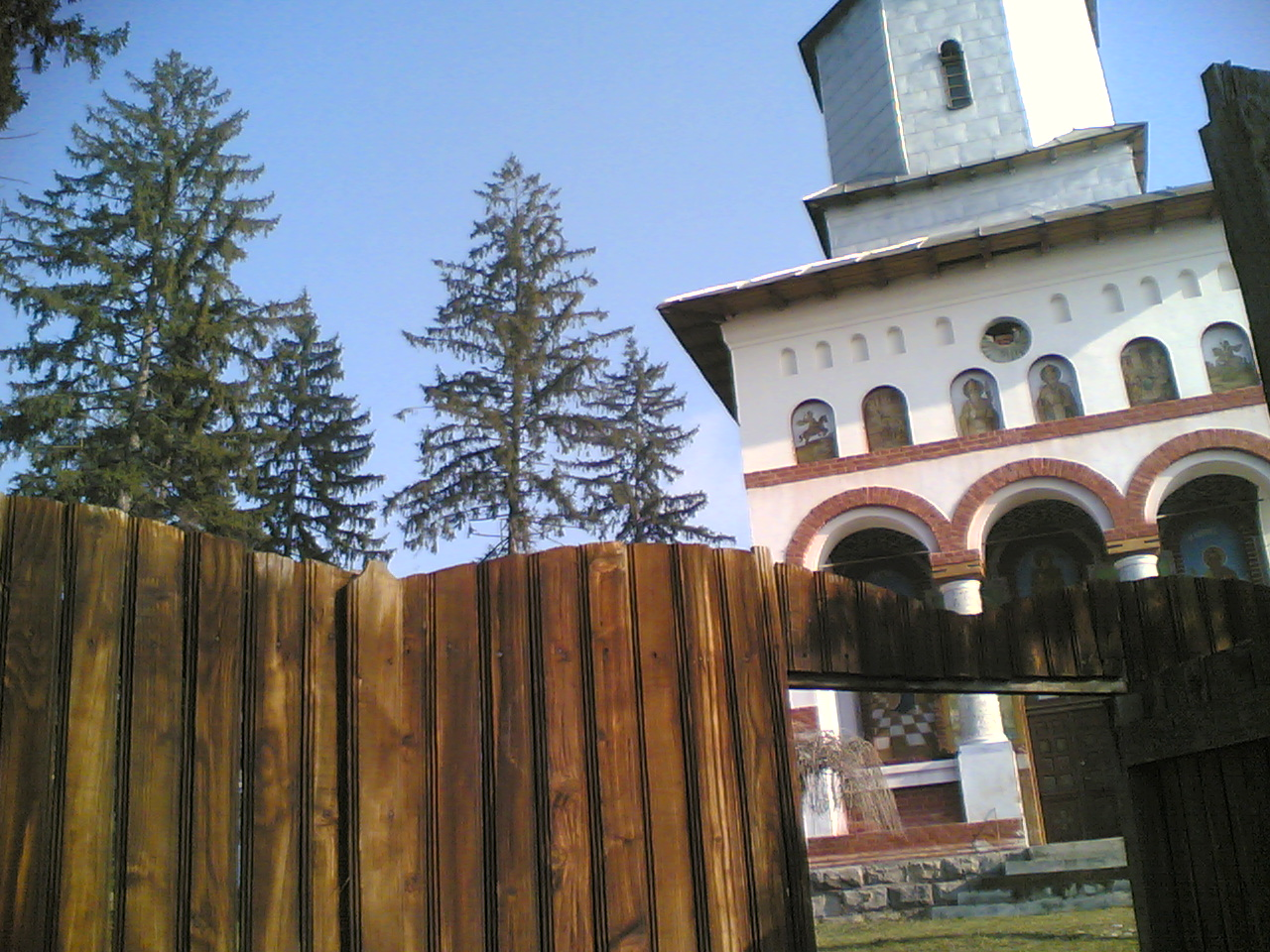
The Church

Oltenian Style House from Ciorăști

Oltenian Style House from Ciorăști

Oltenian Style House from Ciorăști

Oltenian Style House from Ciorăști
