= Bolotești =

- Commune
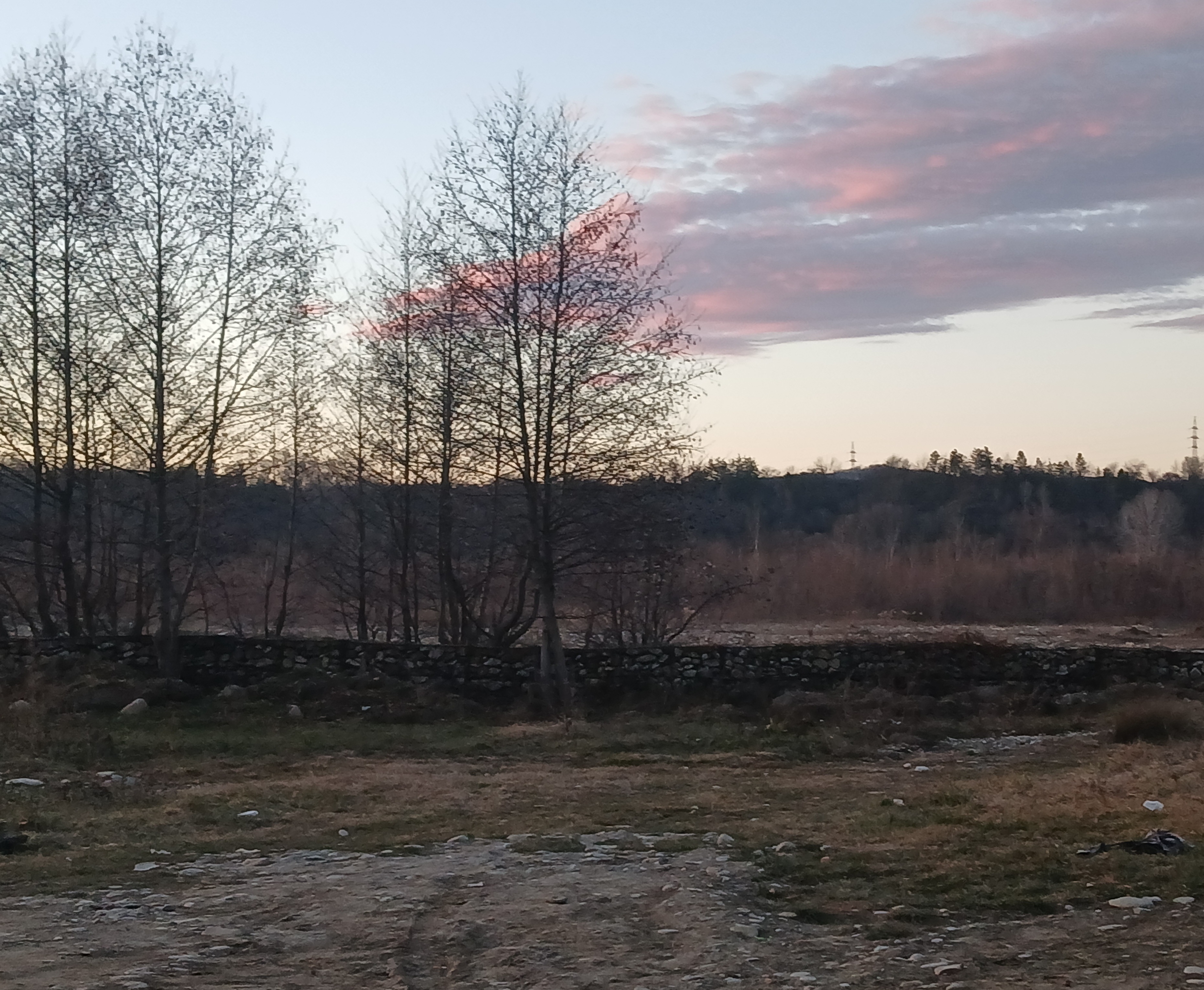

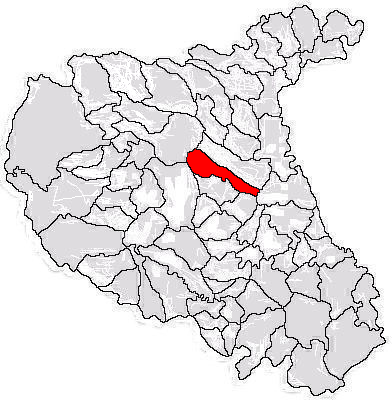
- Location in Vrancea County

- Location in Romania
- Coordinates: 45°50′N 27°4′E
- Country: Romania
- County: Vrancea

Government
  - Mayor (2024–2028): Fănică Popa (PNL)
- Area: 96.43 km^{2} (37.23 sq mi)
- Lowest elevation: 144 m (472 ft)
- Population (2021-12-01): 5,203
  - Density: 53.96/km^{2} (139.7/sq mi)
- Time zone: UTC+02:00 (EET)
  - Summer (DST): UTC+03:00 (EEST)
- Postal code: 627035
- Area code: +(40) 237
- Vehicle reg.: VN
- Website: comunabolotesti.ro

Bolotești is a commune located in Vrancea County, Romania. It is composed of six villages: Bolotești, Găgești, Ivăncești, Pietroasa, Putna, and Vităneștii de sub Măgură.

The commune is situated on the banks of the river Putna, 15 km (9.3 mi) from the town of Panciu.

Historical population
Year	Pop.	±%
2002	4,588	—
2011	4,231	−7.8%
2021	5,203	+23.0%
Source: Census data

== Natives ==
- Ion Cristoiu (born 1948), journalist, writer, and political analyst
