= Szatmári Magyar Hírlap =

- Type: Daily newspaper
- Format: Compact
- Owner(s): Pacurar Dumitru, Szilagyi Iosif
- Editor: Sam Grup Consulting
- Founded: 2005
- Headquarters: Retezatului str., Nr. 32, Satu Mare
- Website: hirlap.ro

Szatmári Magyar Hírlap (Hungarian News from Szatmár) is a Romanian daily newspaper, issued in Hungarian language by the Sam Grup Consulting company and focused mainly on politics, public affairs, sports and economy. The first edition was printed in 2005.
