= Krónika =

Romanian newspaper

- Type: Daily newspaper
- Owner(s): Krónika Kiadó
- Editor: Samu Csinta
- Founded: November 1999
- Language: Hungarian
- Headquarters: Septimiu Albini street 113; Cluj-Napoca, Romania
- Website: kronikaonline.ro

Krónika (English: Chronicle) is the sole Hungarian-language Romanian newspaper of national circulation. It is based in Cluj-Napoca. The circulation is approximately 80,000.
