= Transindex =

Hungarian news website (1999-2022)

- Website type: Online newspaper
- Available in: Hungarian
- Founded: 1999
- Dissolved: 2022
- Successor: Transtelex
- Headquarters: Cluj-Napoca
- Area served: Transylvania
- Website: transindex.ro
- Current status: Offline

Transindex was a Hungarian online newspaper published in Transylvania, Romania. Founded in 1999 and headquartered in Cluj-Napoca, it served as a primary independent news source for the Hungarian minority in Romania until its dissolution in 2022.

== History ==
It was originally intended by its founders as the Transylvanian edition of Index.hu, but in June 1999 it was launched independently with the support of the Transylvanian Hungarian Technical Scientific Society and Nextra Ltd. The first version of the portal, which was running in experimental mode, still closely resembled Internettó in appearance. At that time, its publisher was the Média Index Association, and the responsible editor was Attila Kelemen.

In 2017, two articles were written on Transindex, alleging that actor Lóránd Váta had committed sexual harassment. The actor then sued and won, resulting in him receiving financial compensation and Transindex's editor-in-chief stepping down.

In February 2022, the entire editorial staff resigned due to political pressure and funding cuts. The staff then partnered with Telex.hu to form Transtelex.
