= Tipograful Român =

Romanian workers' newspaper

Tipograful Român ('Romanian Typographer') was a Romanian language newspaper, which began publishing in 1865. Tipograful Român was the first Romanian workers' newspaper.
