= George Țărnea =

George Țărnea (born Ghiorghe Țărnea; November 10, 1945 – May 2, 2003) was a Romanian poet.

Born to Grigore and Maria Țărnea in Șirineasa, Vâlcea County, he graduated from the theoretical high school in nearby Băbeni. He then attended the faculty of philosophy at the University of Bucharest, interrupted without licence. His work appeared in most of Romania's main literary magazines. Țărnea's first published poem was "Drumeție", which ran in Secera și ciocanul newspaper in 1964. His first book, a poetry volume, was the 1974 Testamentele înțeleptului. In 1980, he was awarded prizes by the Romanian Writers' Union and by the organization's Craiova chapter.
