= Cornel Nistorescu =

Romanian journalist (born 1948)

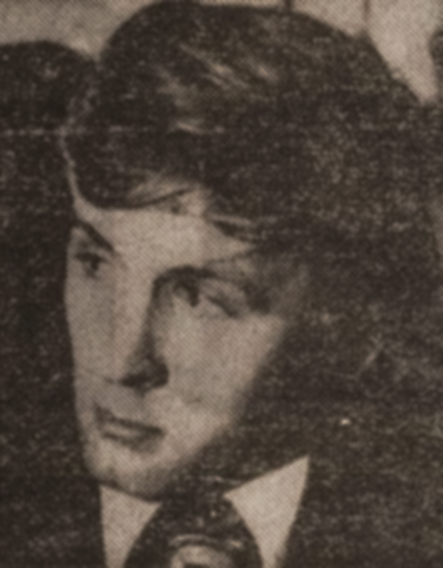
Nistorescu as a young man

Cornel Nistorescu (born December 15, 1948) is a Romanian journalist, known for his editorial "Ode to America" regarding the American response to the terrorist attacks of September 11, 2001.

Nistorescu was born in Turmaș, Hunedoara County, the son of Aurel Nistoresc and Ilina (née Popa). He graduated from the University of Cluj in 1974 with a degree in Philology, Romanian, and Italian Languages and Literatures. Nistorescu speaks Romanian, English, French, and Italian.

Nistorescu is a former editor and founder of several publications, and was the General Manager of the Evenimentul Zilei daily and head of the Expres company. He has written three books and is a contributor to cultural publications or newspapers and weeklies in Belgium, the Netherlands, France, and the United States.

== Honours ==
- (Romania) Romanian Royal Family: 67th Knight of the Royal Decoration of the Cross of the Romanian Royal House
