= Nine O'Clock =

Romanian English-language newspaper

- Type: Daily newspaper
- Format: print and online
- Owner(s): Mihai MANEA
- Publisher: Mihai MANEA
- Editor: Andreea DRAGAN
- Founded: 1991
- Headquarters: Piata Presei Libere no.1, Building C1, Ground floor, Office 10, 11, 14 A, 14 B, Sector 1, Bucharest
- City: Bucharest
- Country: Romania
- Website: www.nineoclock.ro

Nine O'Clock is a Romanian English-language newspaper.

The newspaper consists mainly of sections related to politics, business, sports, culture, Romania-related news and weather.
