= Evenimentul Zilei =

Online newspaper in Romania

- Type: Daily newspaper
- Format: Berliner
- Owner: Editura Evenimentul și Capital
- Founder(s): Ion Cristoiu; Cornel Nistorescu; Mihai Cârciog
- Editor-in-chief: Simona Ionescu
- Founded: 22 June 1992; 33 years ago
- Ceased publication: 30 December 2019; 5 years ago (physical)
- Language: Romanian
- Headquarters: Romexpo (entrance B), Pavilion G4, 65-67 Mărăști Boulevard, Sector 1, Bucharest 011465
- Country: Romania
- ISSN: 1222-328X
- OCLC number: 896832327
- Website: www.evz.ro

Evenimentul Zilei is a formerly physical and now exclusively online newspaper in Romania. Its name translates to "The event of the day" or "Today's event".

== History and profile ==
Evenimentul Zilei was founded by Ion Cristoiu, Cornel Nistorescu, and Mihai Cârciog, and the first issue was published on 22 June 1992. Ion Cristoiu, one of the 3 founders of the newspaper, was also its first director, but he is currently columnist at the same newspaper

The newspaper reached its peak daily circulation of 675,000 in 1993. In 1997 chief editor Ion Cristoiu quit and this job was taken by Cornel Nistorescu. The newspaper was purchased along with its parent company Expres Publishing in 1998 by the German company Gruner + Jahr (owned, in turn, by Bertelsmann), which later, in 2003 sold it to the Swiss press trust Ringier; at the time of purchase, Ringier representatives stated that there would be no direct or indirect intervention in the newspaper's editorial policy.

In September 2004 more than 50 Evenimentul Zilei journalists protested Ringier's management decisions. Similar issues were raised at the same time at rival daily România liberă, owned by Germany's WAZ-Mediengruppe. At both papers, journalists have complained that foreign owners are telling them to lessen the political coverage and tone down their negative reporting of the government. Their concern has been echoed by a variety of organizations including the Open Society Foundations. After this scandal, Evenimentul Zilei became one of the most fervent attackers of the government's corruption. Nonetheless, Evenimentul Zilei remained "The biggest thorn in [Adrian] Nastase's side" throughout the 2004 Romanian elections.

Ten days after Năstase's defeat in the 13 December 2004 runoff elections, the Ringier group moved the EZ editor-in-chief, Dan Turturică, to Bacău (officially, to look into the possibility of starting a free newspaper there) and began changing the editorial policy, to become a tabloid. As a response, 80 journalists signed a protest against these decisions and organized rallies in front of the Swiss and EU embassies. Subsequent negotiations were unsuccessful and on 4 January 2005, 30 journalists resigned, in addition to another five that resigned several days earlier. Paid circulation dropped at least 40% from a high of over 100,000.

In 2010 Ringier sold its shares in the paper to Bobby Păunescu. In 2019, the newspaper ceased to exist on paper after 8650 numbers. From 1 January 2020, the team moved exclusively online.
