= Új Magyar Szó =

Newspaper in Romania

- Type: Daily newspaper
- Owner(s): Scripta
- Editor: Hugó Ágoston
- Founded: October 2005
- Language: Hungarian
- Ceased publication: July 2012
- Headquarters: Piața Presei Libere, 1 Bucharest, Romania
- Website: maszol.ro

Új Magyar Szó (English: New Hungarian Word) was a Hungarian-language Romanian broadsheet newspaper, based in Bucharest. It had one of the largest audiences of all Hungarian-language papers in Romania; its readership was estimated at 40,000. Since 2012, only an online edition is accessible.

== History ==
The history of Új Magyar Szó can be traced back to 1947, when Romániai Magyar Szó ("Hungarian Word of Romania") was first published in Bucharest. In 1953 it changed its name to Előre ("Forward"), and it became the propaganda newspaper of the Communist Party. After the fall of Nicolae Ceaușescu, the name was changed back to Romániai Magyar Szó. In August 2005 Romániai Magyar Szó went bankrupt. Its successor was Új Magyar Szó, which was in print between 2005 and 2012. Since 2012, it appears only as an online edition.
