= Curierul Național =

Romanian daily newspaper

- Editor: Ștefan Rădeanu
- Categories: News
- Frequency: Daily
- Founded: December 5 1991
- Country: Romania
- Language: Romanian
- Website: curierulnational.ro

Curierul Național is a Romanian daily newspaper founded by Valentin Păunescu and Adrian Sârbu, along with five other shareholders, including George Constantin Păunescu and Sergiu Nicolaescu. The first issue was published in Bucharest on December 5, 1990, with Horia Alexandrescu as managing editor.

First editorial staff included Constantin Drăgan, Răzvan Bărbulescu, Dan Dumitrescu, and the section editors were Adrian Vasilescu, Alexandru Stroe and Cristian Teodorescu.The contributors included Fănuș Neagu, Beatrice Buzea, Florin Condurățeanu, Ralu Filip or Nicolae Truță.

In the 1990s, important names of the Romanian press, such as Radu Soviani, Eugen Ovidiu Chirovici, Dan Diaconescu or Marius Tucă, made their debut in media, and were part of the editorial staff of the publication.

Since 2005 Curierul Național has positioned itself as an economic newspaper and has switched to a new layout specific to this type of publication. The logo was changed from the original postcard to a simple logo, consisting of letters only, without any graphic elements.

Since issue 7576, published on February 16, 2018, Curierul Național has returned to the old logo, that has been restyled and used on all pages of the printed edition. The publication is also starting to revamp its editorial policy, publishing weekly interviews and materials with business people and employers' representatives from various industries.

Starting September 4, 2018, Curierul Național launched the new portal, an upgrade of the old version of the website. The print edition has been published continuously for over 30 years and has 12 pages, full color.

Curierul Național is the only Romanian publication that is a founding member of the Belt and Road Economic Information Partnership.
