= List of members of the European Parliament for Romania, 2024–2029 =

Members of the European Parliament for Romania
Observers	(2005)
Delegation	(2007)
6th term	(2007)
7th term	(2009)
8th term	(2014)
9th term	(2019)

This is a list of the 34 members of the European Parliament for Romania in the 2024 to 2029 session. The members were elected in the 2024 European Parliament election in Romania.

== List ==
Name	National party	EP Group	Ref.
Mihai Tudose	Social Democratic Party (PSD)	S&D	
Gabriela Firea	Social Democratic Party (PSD)	S&D	
Claudiu Manda	Social Democratic Party (PSD)	S&D	
Victor Negrescu	Social Democratic Party (PSD)	S&D	
Vasile Dîncu	Social Democratic Party (PSD)	S&D	
Gheorghe Cârciu	Social Democratic Party (PSD)	S&D	
Dragoș Benea	Social Democratic Party (PSD)	S&D	
Dan Nica	Social Democratic Party (PSD)	S&D	
Ștefan Mușoiu	Social Democratic Party (PSD)	S&D	
Roxana Mînzatu	Social Democratic Party (PSD)	S&D	
Andi Cristea	Social Democratic Party (PSD)	S&D	
Maria Grapini	Social Liberal Humanist Party (PUSL)	S&D	
Rareș Bogdan	National Liberal Party (PNL)	EPP	
Dan Motreanu	National Liberal Party (PNL)	EPP	
Adina-Ioana Vălean	National Liberal Party (PNL)	EPP	
Daniel Buda	National Liberal Party (PNL)	EPP	
Siegfried Mureșan	National Liberal Party (PNL)	EPP	
Mircea Hava	National Liberal Party (PNL)	EPP	
Gheorghe Falcă	National Liberal Party (PNL)	EPP	
Virgil-Daniel Popescu	National Liberal Party (PNL)	EPP	
Cristian Terheș	Romanian National Conservative Party (PNCR)	ECR	
Claudiu Târziu	Conservative Action	ECR	
Șerban-Dimitrie Sturdza	Conservative Action	ECR	
Gheorghe Piperea	Alliance for the Union of Romanians (AUR)	ECR	
Georgiana Teodorescu	Alliance for the Union of Romanians (AUR)	ECR	
Adrian-George Axinia	Alliance for the Union of Romanians (AUR)	ECR	
Dan Barna	Save Romania Union (USR)	RE	
Vlad Voiculescu	Save Romania Union (USR)	RE	
Eugen Tomac	People's Movement Party (PMP)	RE	
Iuliu Winkler	Democratic Alliance of Hungarians in Romania (RMDSZ)	EPP	
Lóránt Vincze	Democratic Alliance of Hungarians in Romania (RMDSZ)	EPP	
Diana Șoșoacă	S.O.S. Romania (SOS RO)	Non-attached members	
Luis Lazarus	S.O.S. Romania (SOS RO)	Non-attached members	
Nicolae Ștefănuță	Independent	Greens/EFA	
