= 2024 European Parliament election in Romania =

- 9 June 2024

All 33 Romanian seats in the European Parliament
- Turnout: 52.42%
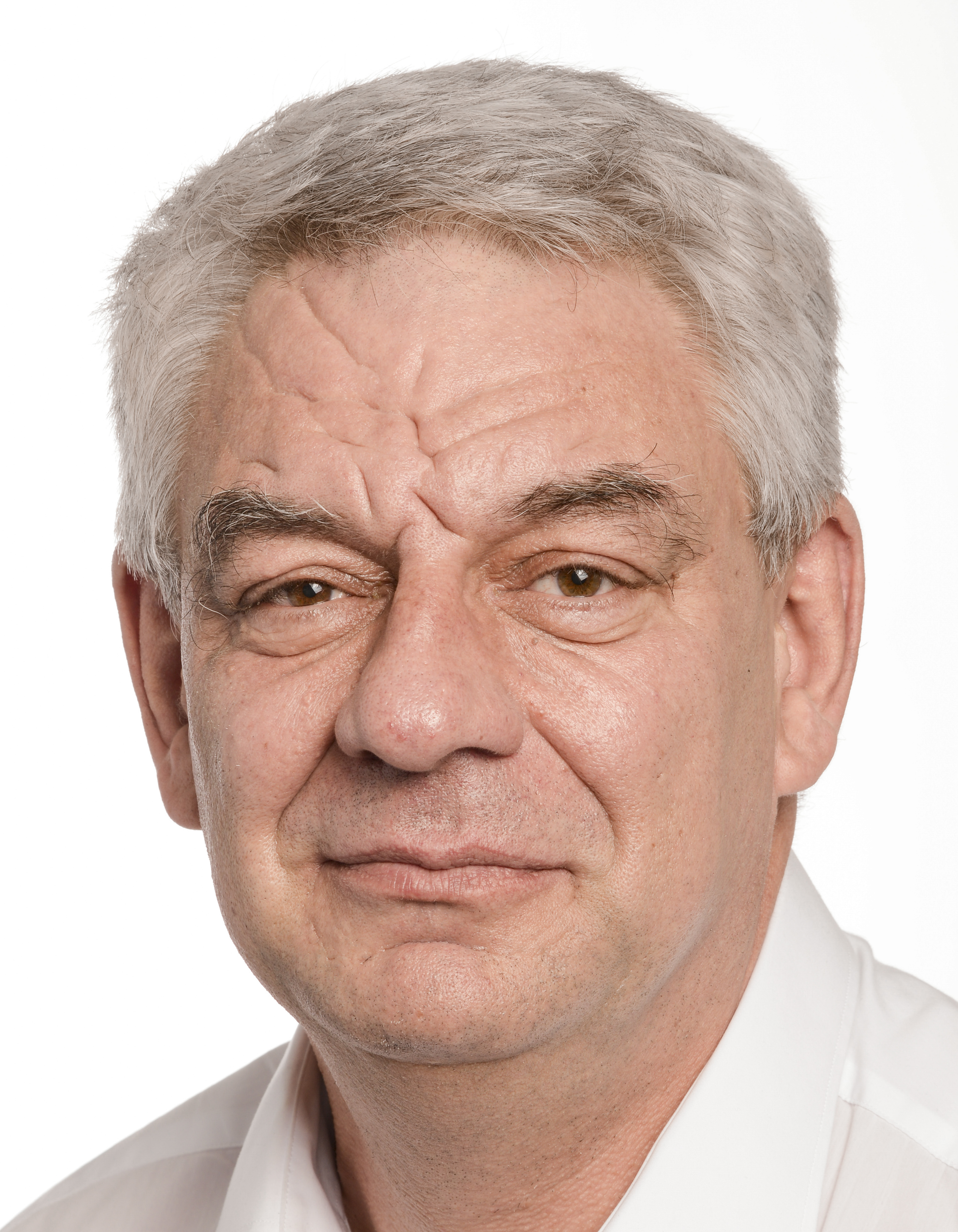

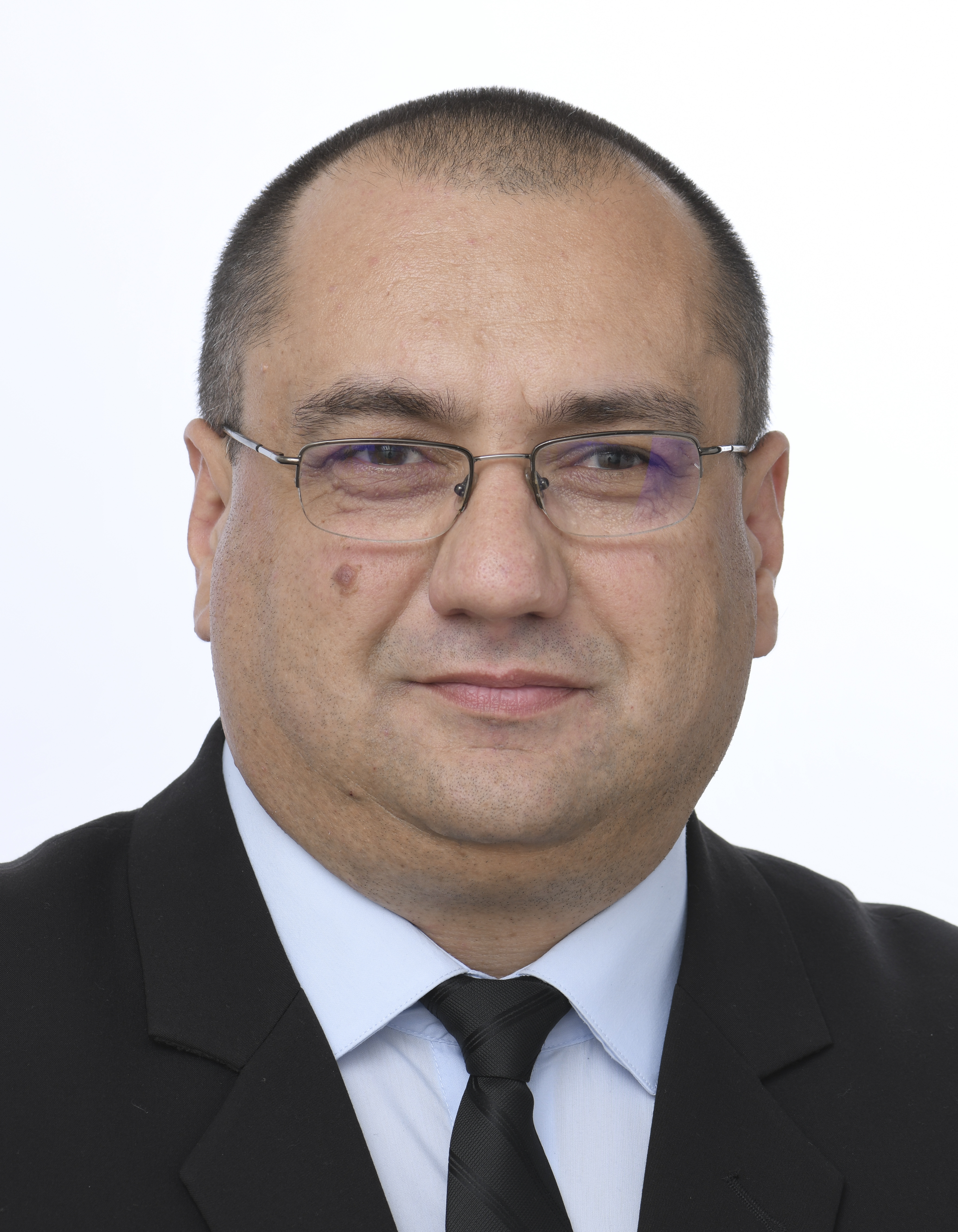

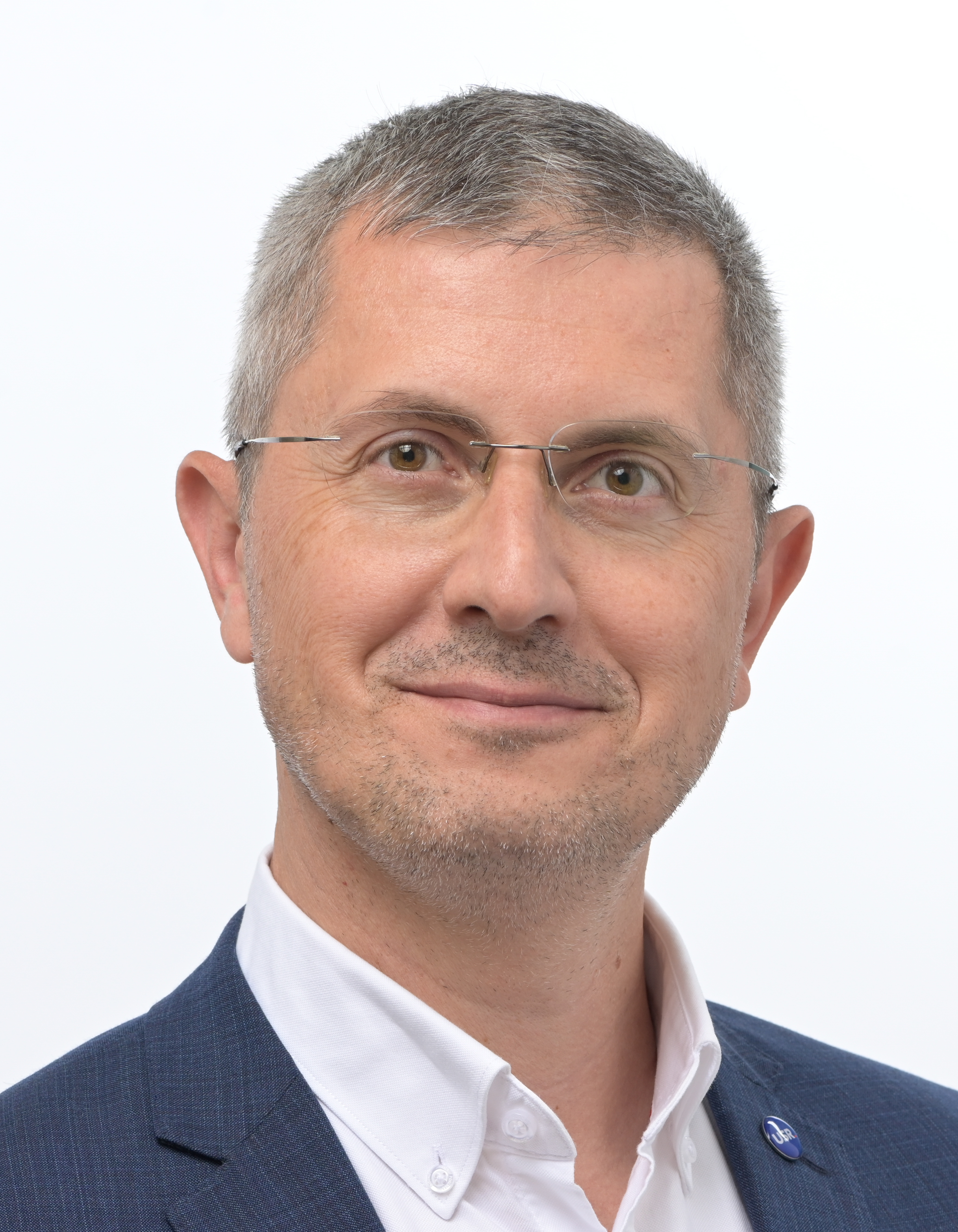

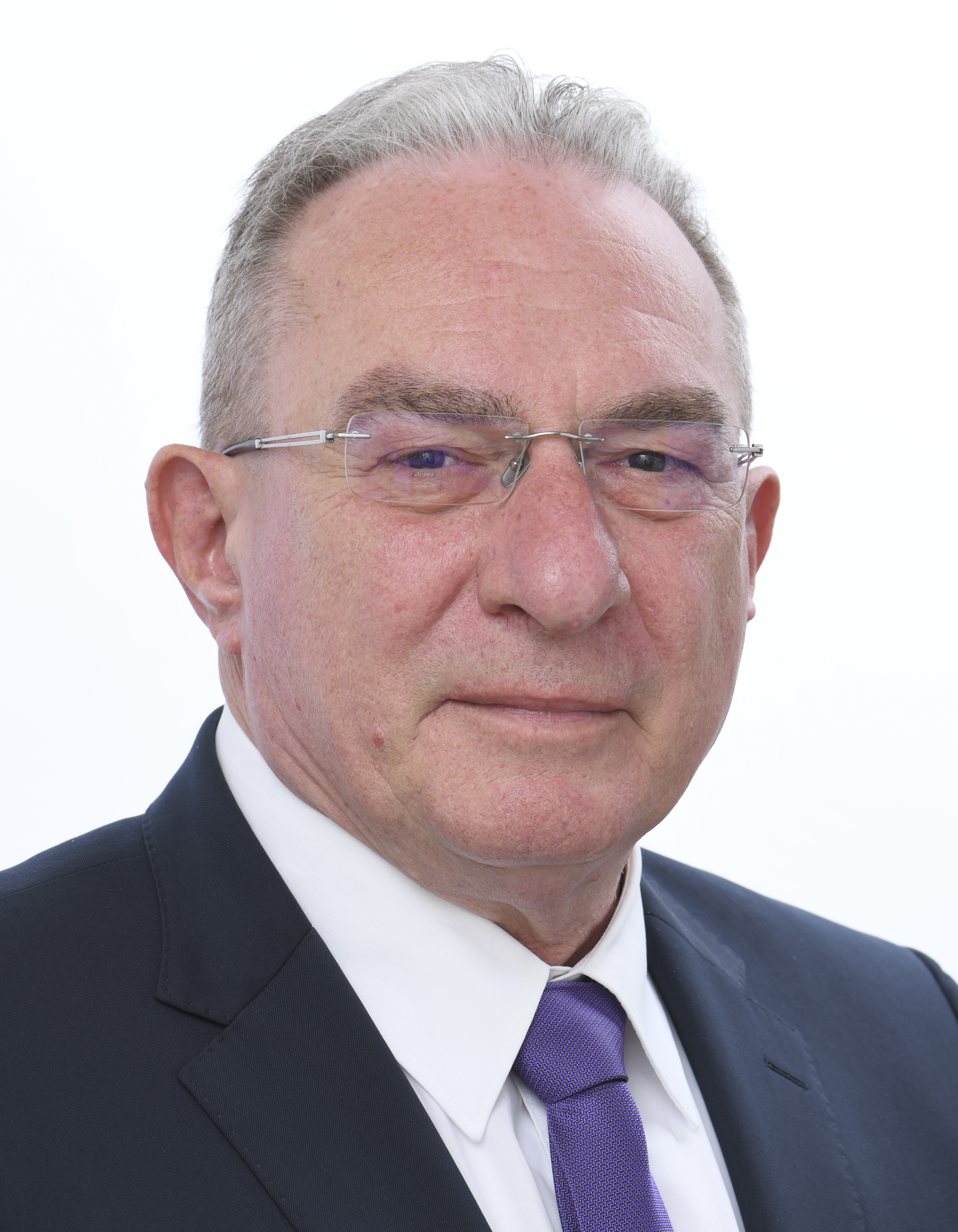

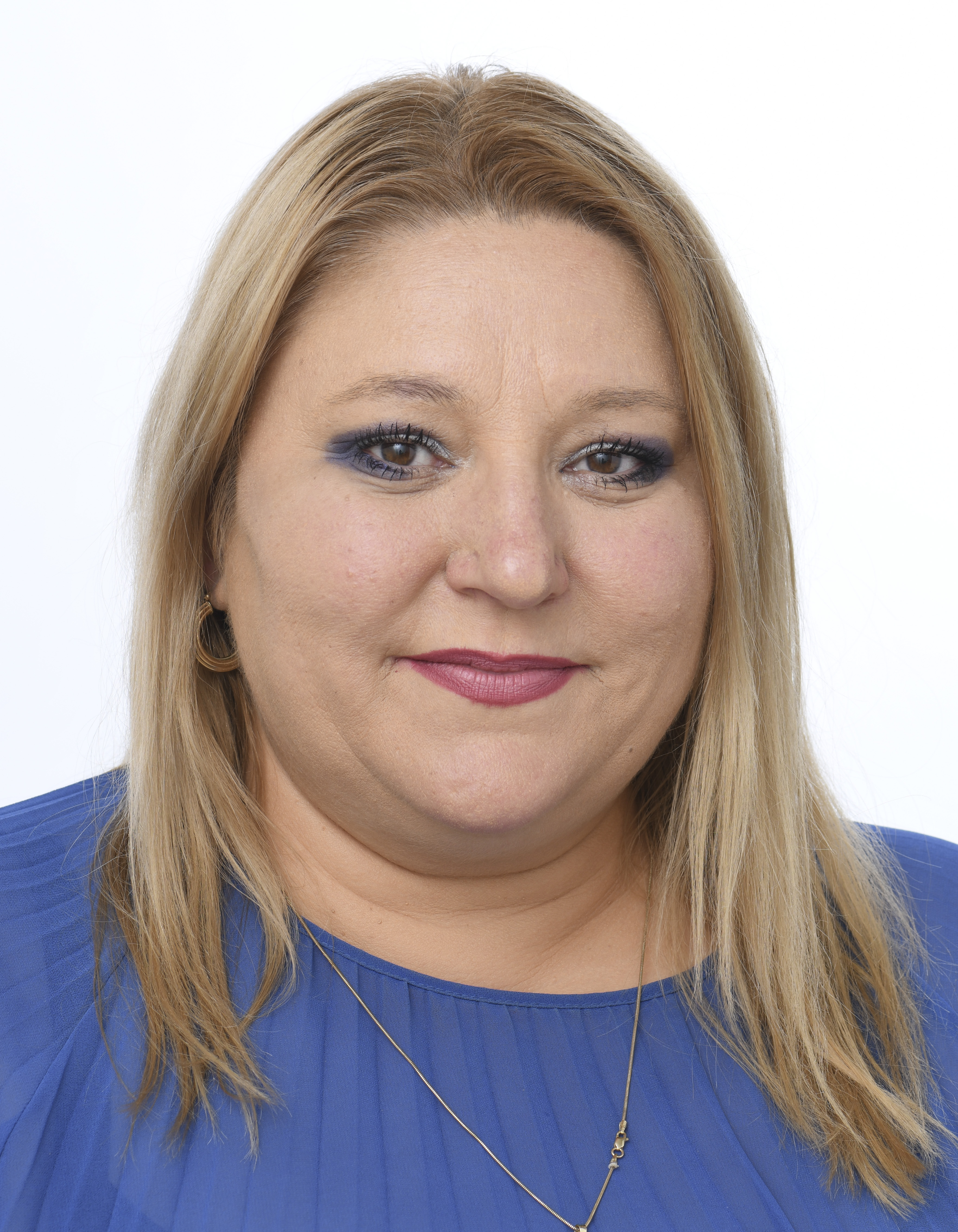

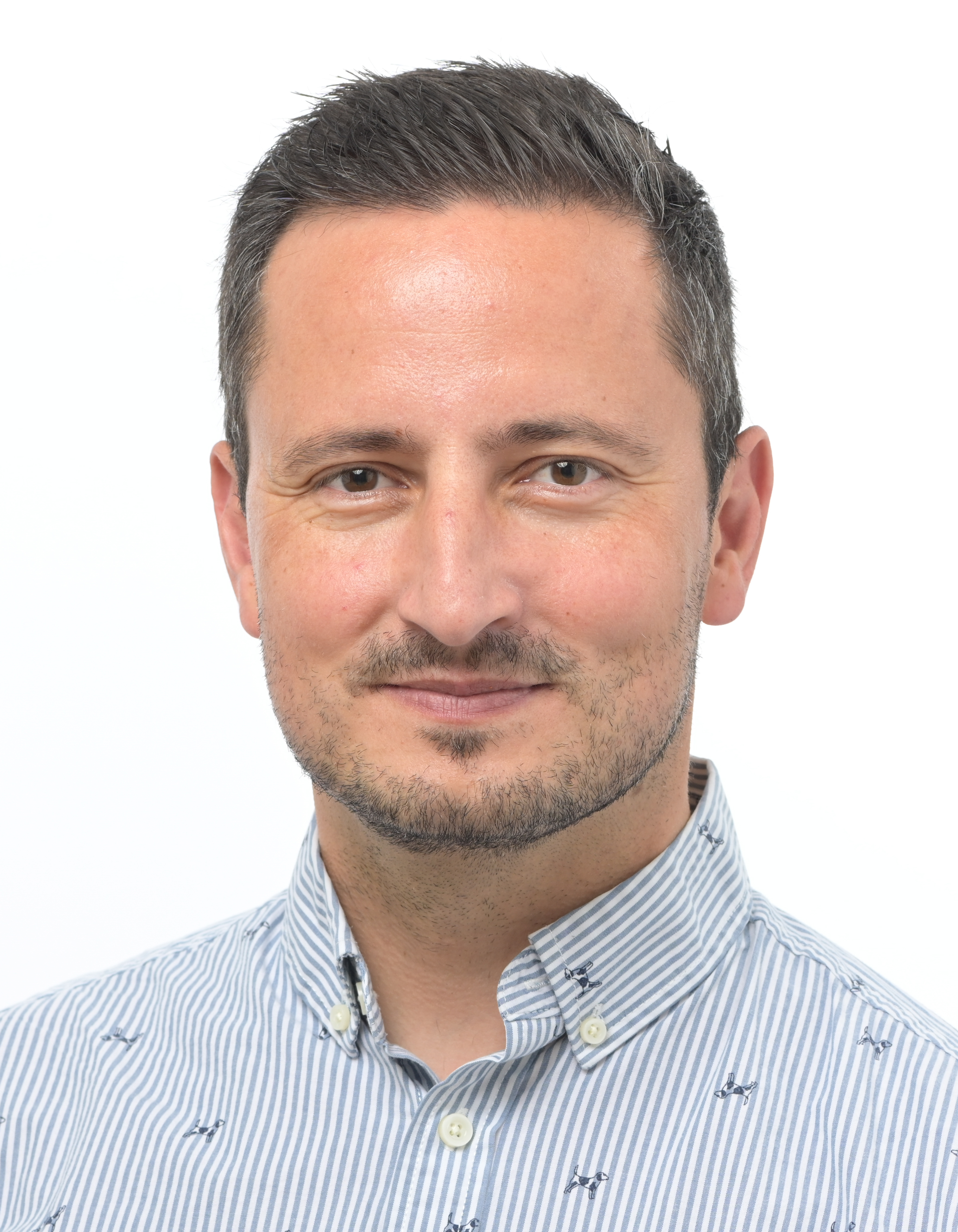
	First party	Second party	Third party
Leader	Mihai Tudose	Cristian Terheș	Dan Barna
Party	PSD–PNL	AUR Alliance	ADU
Alliance	S&D–EPP	ECR	RE
Last election	19 seats, 49.50%	– (Note: AUR leader George Simion ran as an independent candidate and received 1.29% of the votes, failing to gain a seat)	10 seats, 28.12%
Seats won	19	6	3
Seat change	Steady	New	▼7
Popular vote	4,341,686	1,334,905	778,901
Percentage	48.55%	14.93%	8.71%
	Fourth party	Fifth party	Sixth party
Leader	Iuliu Winkler	Diana Șoșoacă	Nicu Ștefănuță
Party	UDMR	SOS RO	Independent (Note: He was previously affiliated with the Democratic-Liberal Party, and then Save Romania Union)
Alliance	EPP	NI	Greens/EFA
Last election	2 seats, 5.26%	–	–
Seats won	2	2	1
Seat change	Steady	New	New
Popular vote	579,180	450,040	275,796
Percentage	6.48%	5.03%	3.08%
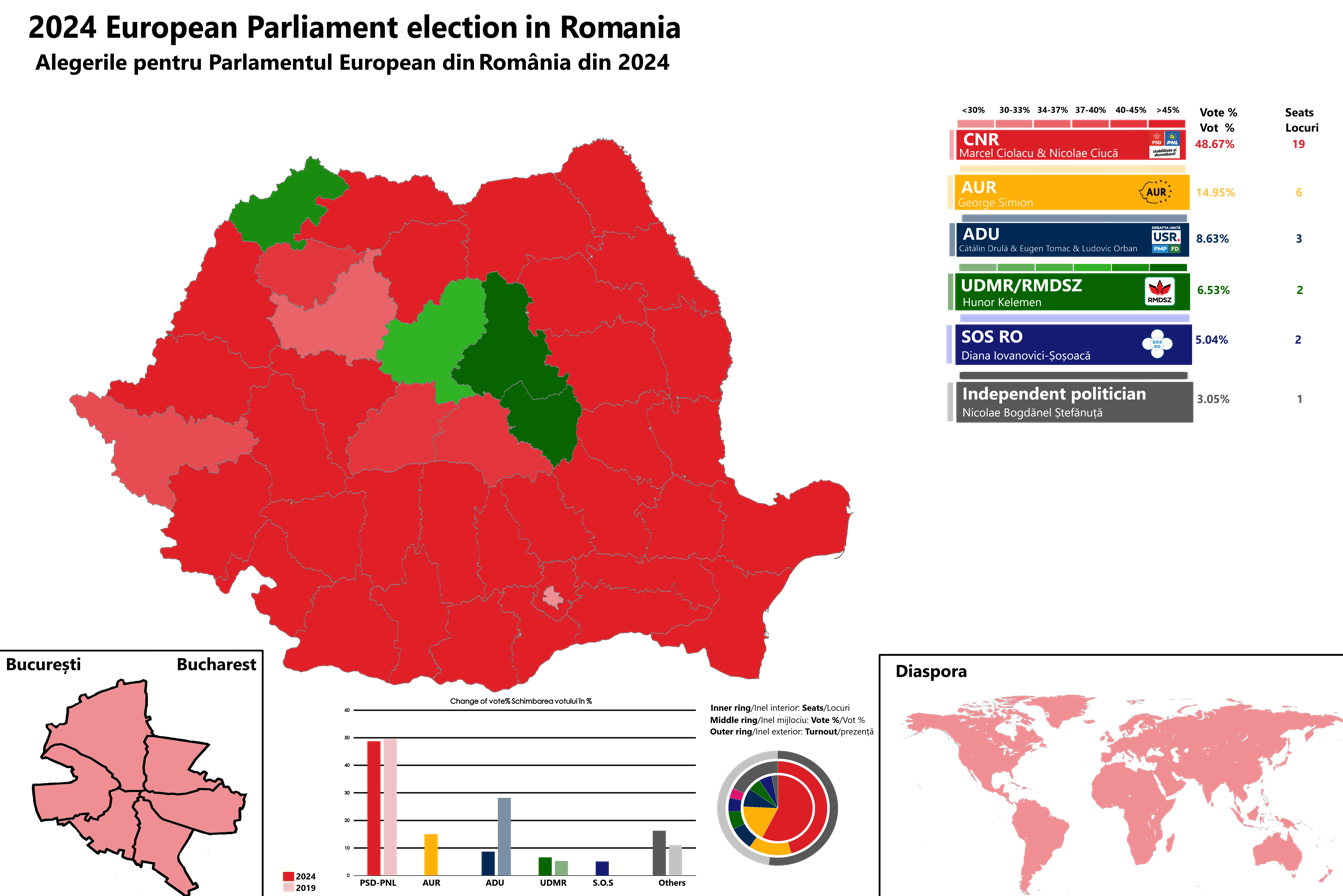

The 2024 European Parliament election in Romania was held on 9 June 2024. This was the fifth European Parliament election to be held in Romania since the country's accession to the European Union in 2007 and the first since Brexit.

== Voting procedure ==
The 33 Romanian MEPs (Note: After the official exit of UK from the European Union, the Romanian delegation in the European Parliament increased by one member, now having 33 MEPs.) are elected by direct universal suffrage by all EU citizens registered on the electoral rolls and over 18 years of age. The ballot is held in a single electoral district on the basis of proportional representation, which means that the number of MPs elected from each political party depends on the number of votes obtained by the party. Romania uses a closed list system, which does not allow changing the order number of the candidates on the list. Seats in the European Parliament are allocated to parties that obtain at least 5% of the votes validly cast by the D'Hondt method.

== Background ==
=== National Coalition for Romania ===
In the last European parliamentary elections, in 2019, PSD obtained 9 mandates. It was the weakest electoral result recorded by the PSD in its entire European Parliament electoral history, largely based on the soft eurosceptic and nationalist rhetoric that the party adopted during the leadership of Liviu Dragnea, the constant, brutal weakening of the rule of law, and the encouragement of corruption.

There followed a period when the party changed 2 presidents within a few months: Liviu Dragnea (27 May 2019) and Viorica Dăncilă (November 2019). In November 2019, Marcel Ciolacu took over as ad interim/acting president of the PSD and was later fully elected in 2020 at a party congress. Throughout Marcel Ciolacu's presidency, PSD tried to distance itself from the eurosceptic and nationalist rhetoric and 'wash' its image as a party endorsing corruption at high political level. From 2021, the PSD has been one of the two main governing parties alongside the National Liberal Party (PNL) within the National Coalition for Romania (CNR).

The National Liberal Party (PNL) ranked first in the last European parliamentary elections, obtaining 10 mandates. The speeches of PNL leaders and candidates oscillated during the campaign between a focus on European policy topics and an emphasis on domestic politics and disputes with the governing coalition. Among the electoral promises were: raising the MCV, Romania's accession to the Schengen Area and the eurozone, improving the rule of law and investments by accessing European funds.

After the 2020 parliamentary elections, the PNL entered the government together with the USR PLUS and the Democratic Alliance of Hungarians in Romania (UDMR/RMDSZ), a coalition that lasted until September 2021. Throughout 2021, tensions have increased within the National Liberal Party (PNL), with the then party's president Ludovic Orban being challenged by high-ranking politicians within the party. At the September 2021 party congress, former Romanian controversial Prime Minister Florin Cîțu won the party presidency over Ludovic Orban. However, Cîțu did not remain the party's president for too long, as in April 2022, at an extraordinary party congress with only one candidate, former Prime Minister Nicolae Ciucă became the new president of the party (and is still its current leader). Following the loss of the party presidency by former longtime president Ludovic Orban and the political crisis of 2021, a new splinter party from the PNL, Force of the Right (FD), was founded by former Prime Minister Ludovic Orban.

=== Save Romania Union (USR) ===
Save Romania Union (USR) participated in the 2019 elections as part of the 2020 USR PLUS Alliance, an alliance between the parties USR and Freedom, Unity and Solidarity Party (PLUS), which later merged together as Save Romania Union (USR), previously obtaining 8 MEP mandates. It was the best electoral result recorded by the USR since its establishment in 2016. The 2019 electoral campaign focused in particular on a pro-European platform, and, among the most notable electoral offers were the following: protecting the rights of Romanians in the European Union (EU), Romania's accession to the Schengen Area, positive changes in education, agriculture and infrastructure as well as taking measures to increase social welfare and the overall economic situation of the country. Also, in the rallies held during the election campaign, the message of the USR PLUS Alliance emphasized the fight against a corrupt and authoritarian government power.

In 2020, USR PLUS entered government alongside the National Liberal Party (PNL) and the Democratic Alliance of Hungarians in Romania (UDMR/RMDSZ). In 2021, USR and PLUS officially merged, with only the Save Romania Union (USR) name being retained by both parties as part of the fusion protocol. In September 2021, the forced exit of the USR from the government by the PNL and incumbent President Klaus Iohannis triggered a political crisis which ended by the subsequent entry of the PSD into government alongside PNL and UDMR/RMDSZ. In October 2021, the USR congress elected former Prime Minister Dacian Cioloș as president of the party, but the latter did not hold the position for a long time, as in February 2022 he resigned from this leading position within the party. Later on, Cătălin Drulă was elected party president and is the current party leader.

In January 2023, USR MEP Nicolae Ștefănuță announced his departure from the party and his affiliation with the Greens–European Free Alliance as an independent.

In the late of 2023, the leaders of USR, People's Movement Party (PMP) and Force of the Right (FD) announced their intention to form a center-right alliance to compete together in the 2024 European Parliament elections. On 18 December 2023, USR, PMP and FD officially launched United Right Alliance, going to run on a joint list for European Parliament elections.

=== Renewing Romania's European Project (REPER) ===
In May 2022, Dacian Cioloș together with 4 other MEPs previously elected on the USR PLUS' list announced the launch of a new political party, namely REPER, with MEPs Dragoș Pîslaru, Ramona Strugariu, Alin Mituța, and Dragoș Tudorache leaving the USR and joining REPER in the meantime.

=== Alliance for the Union of Romanians (AUR) ===
The Alliance for the Union of Romanians (AUR) is a political party that was founded by the independent 2019 MEP candidate George Simion in December 2019. The unexpected entry of the AUR into the Romanian Parliament after the 2020 elections resulted in the emergence over time in the press of articles labelling AUR as a right-wing extremist party with an ultra-nationalist, eurosceptic, neo-legionary, chauvinist and populist rhetoric. From 2021, AUR plans to affiliate with the European Parliament group of European Conservatives and Reformists (ECR).

=== AER for Romania Alliance (Greens and Ecologists) ===
On 9 December 2023, leaders of Green Party (Verzii) and Ecologist Party of Romania (PER) announced a new political alliance on political scene for 2024 European Parliament elections, AER for Romania Alliance Greens and Ecologists.

=== Social Liberal Humanist Party (PUSL) ===
On 17 March 2024, Sector 5 mayor Cristian Popescu Piedone announced that the he will be first on the party's list for the European Parliament Elections.

== The Romanian delegation to the European Parliament before the 2024 elections ==
European Parliament group	Mandates	National party	Mandates	Notes
European People's Party Group	14 / 33	National Liberal Party (PNL)	10 / 33	(Note: Vasile Blaga, Rareș Bogdan, Daniel Buda, Siegfried Mureșan, Cristian Bușoi, Gheorghe Falcă, Mircea Hava, Marian-Jean Marinescu, Dan Motreanu, Vlad Nistor)
European People's Party Group	14 / 33	People's Movement Party (PMP)	2 / 33	(Note: Traian Băsescu, Eugen Tomac)
European People's Party Group	14 / 33	Democratic Alliance of Hungarians in Romania (UDMR/RMDSZ)	2 / 33	(Note: Lóránt Vincze, Iuliu Winkler)
Progressive Alliance of Socialists and Democrats	10 / 33	Social Democratic Party (PSD)	8 / 33	(Note: Rovana Plumb, Carmen Avram, Dragoș Benea, Tudor Ciuhodaru, Claudiu Manda, Victor Negrescu, Dan Nica, Mihai Tudose)
Progressive Alliance of Socialists and Democrats	10 / 33	PRO Romania (PRO)	1 / 33	(Note: Corina Crețu)
Progressive Alliance of Socialists and Democrats	10 / 33	Social Liberal Humanist Party (PUSL)	1 / 33	(Note: Maria Grapini)
Renew Europe	7 / 33	Save Romania Union (USR)	1 / 33	(Note: Vlad Botoș)
Renew Europe	7 / 33	Renewing Romania's European Project (REPER)	5 / 33	(Note: Dacian Cioloș, Alin Mituța, Dragoș Pîslaru, Ramona Strugariu, Dragoș Tudorache)
Renew Europe	7 / 33	Independent	1 / 33	(Note: Vlad Gheorghe)
European Conservatives and Reformists	1 / 33	Christian Democratic National Peasants' Party (PNȚCD)	1 / 33	(Note: Cristian Terheș)
Greens–European Free Alliance	1 / 33	Independent	1 / 33	(Note: Nicolae Ștefănuță)
Source: European Parliament

== The Expected Romanian delegation to the European Parliament after the 2024 elections (partial results) ==
European Parliament group	Mandates	National party	Mandates	Notes
European People's Party Group	10 / 33	National Liberal Party (PNL)	8 / 33	
European People's Party Group	10 / 33	Democratic Alliance of Hungarians in Romania (UDMR/RMDSZ)	2 / 33	(Note: Lóránt Vincze, Iuliu Winkler)
Progressive Alliance of Socialists and Democrats	11 / 33	Social Democratic Party (PSD)	10 / 33	(Note: Mihai Tudose, Gabriela Firea, Claudiu Manda, Victor Negrescu, Vasile Dîncu, Gheorghe Cârciu, Dragoș Benea, Dan Nica, Ștefan Mușoiu, Roxana Mînzatu)
Progressive Alliance of Socialists and Democrats	11 / 33	Social Liberal Humanist Party (PUSL)	1 / 33	(Note: Maria Grapini)
Renew Europe	3 / 33	Save Romania Union (USR)	2 / 33	(Note: Dan Barna, Vlad Voiculescu)
Renew Europe	3 / 33	People's Movement Party (PMP)	1 / 33	(Note: Eugen Tomac)
European Conservatives and Reformists	6 / 33	Romanian National Conservative Party (PNCR)	1 / 33	(Note: Cristian Terheș)
European Conservatives and Reformists	6 / 33	Alliance for the Union of Romanians (AUR)	5 / 33	
Non-Inscrits	2 / 33	S.O.S. Romania	2 / 33	(Note: Diana Iovanovici Șoșoacă, Luis Lazarus)
Greens–European Free Alliance	1 / 33	Independent	1 / 33	(Note: Nicolae Ștefănuță)

== Opinion polling ==
Polling firm	Fieldwork date	Sample size	CNR		PUSL S&D	AUR+		ADU			PRO S&D	UDMR EPP	AER		AD ECR	S.O.S. NI	REPER Renew	Others	Lead
Polling firm	Fieldwork date	Sample size	PNL EPP	PSD S&D	PUSL S&D	PNCR ECR	AUR ECR	FD EPP	PMP EPP	USR Renew	PRO S&D	UDMR EPP	PER NI	PV G/EFA	AD ECR	S.O.S. NI	REPER Renew	Others	Lead
INSCOP	20 - 25 May 2024	1,100	43.7		1.3	17.5		14.1			—N/a	6.0	—N/a	—N/a	—N/a	4.4	1.3	11.7	26.2
Sociopol	17–22 May 2024	1,002	47		2	—N/a	21	15			—N/a	5	—N/a	—N/a	0	2	4	4 (Note: Independents 4%, Greater Romania Party 0%, Socialist Romania 0%, Patriotic Party 0%, United Diaspora Party 0%)	24
CSPS	7–15 May 2024	2,613	27		—N/a	—N/a	34	25			—N/a	7	—N/a	—N/a	—N/a	3	4	3	7
INSCOP	12–20 April 2024	1,100	46.6		1.5	—N/a	16.7	13.8			2.7	5.1	2.4	2.0	—N/a	4.5	1.8	2.8	29.9
CSPS	1-7 April 2024	4,085	27.2		—N/a	—N/a	30.2	23.4			—N/a	4.8	—N/a	—N/a	—N/a	2.8	5.8	5.7	3
Sociopol	26 March-2 April 2024	1,002	47		5	—N/a	23	14			1	4	2	—N/a	—N/a	3	0	1	24
CURS	19-28 March 2024	1,067	53		4	—N/a	14	14			—N/a	5	—N/a	—N/a	—N/a	5	—N/a	5	39
CSPS	17-29 March 2024	2,088	37		—N/a	—N/a	27	21			—N/a	4	—N/a	—N/a	—N/a	—N/a	—N/a	11	10
Euractiv	March 2024	—N/a	42		—N/a	—N/a	25	14			2	5	—N/a	—N/a	—N/a	5	1	6	17
Ipsos	23 Feb–5 Mar 2024	970	42.4		3.0	—N/a	20.7	14.2			5.1	3.4	—N/a	—N/a	—N/a	5.9	—N/a	5.2	21.7
INSCOP	22-29 Feb 2024	1,100	43.7		—N/a	—N/a	20.6	13.7			3.7	3.9	3.4		—N/a	6.4	0.9	3.7	23.1
Sociopol	Feb 2024	–	42		1	—N/a	28	15			2	5	2	—N/a	0	3	1	1 (Note: Independents 1%, Sovereign Romania Party 0%)	14
Sociopol	Feb 2024	–	17	31	1	—N/a	24	13			2	5	2	—N/a	0	3	1	1 (Note: Independents 1%, Sovereign Romania Party 0%)	14
INSOMAR	Feb 2024	1,030	40.8		1.5	—N/a	30.5	11.5			1.7	4.5	—N/a	—N/a	—N/a	2	—N/a	7.5 (Note: Romanian Sovereigntist Bloc (NI): 4.2%)	10.3
Avangarde	19–20 Feb 2024	950	20	31	—N/a	—N/a	18	15			—N/a	5	—N/a	—N/a	—N/a	8	2	1	11
CURS	3–14 Feb 2024	1,067	20	31	2	—N/a	20	13			2	4	—N/a	—N/a	—N/a	4	—N/a	4 (Note: Party of the Patriots: 2%)	11
60m.ro	20 Jan 2024	927	16	28	—N/a	—N/a	30	17			—N/a	5	—N/a	—N/a	—N/a	4	—N/a	—N/a	2
INSCOP	16-24 Jan 2024	1,100	18.8	29.5	—N/a	—N/a	18.4	12.9			3.0	4.8	3.5		—N/a	6.5	0.5	2	10.7
CURS	15–27 Jan 2024	1,082	19	30	3	—N/a	21	14			—N/a	5	—N/a	—N/a	—N/a	4	—N/a	4	9
Avangarde	8-22 Jan 2024	1,150	21	31	—N/a	—N/a	19	14			—N/a	5	—N/a	—N/a	—N/a	8	1	1	10
INSOMAR	Jan 2024	1,050	21	25	—N/a	—N/a	22	—N/a	2	9	1	3	—N/a	—N/a	—N/a	3	—N/a	9 (Note: Romanian Sovereigntist Bloc (NI): 3%)	3
Sociopol	Jan 2024	–	17	29	1	0	23	13			2	5	2	—N/a	1	3	1	1 (Note: Independents 2%, ALDE 0%, Sovereign Romania Party 0%)	6
CIRA	Jan 2024	1,000	20	30	—N/a	—N/a	18	2	2	14	—N/a	5	—N/a	—N/a	—N/a	6	2	1	10
CURS	26–30 Dec 2023	852	19	31	4	—N/a	19	1	4	9	2	4	—N/a	—N/a	—N/a	5	—N/a	2	12
Mercury Research	30 Oct–6 Nov 2023	1,227	16	26	0	—N/a	19	22			—N/a	3	—N/a	—N/a	—N/a	7	1	5	4
Mercury Research	30 Oct–6 Nov 2023	1,227	16	28	1	—N/a	19	2	4	15	—N/a	3	—N/a	—N/a	—N/a	7	1	3	9
Avangarde	20–28 Sep 2023	994	21	31	—N/a	—N/a	19	1	3	13	1	5	—N/a	—N/a	—N/a	5	—N/a	1	10
LARICS	11–25 Sep 2023	1,003	22.9	31.5	1.0	—N/a	14.6	—N/a	4.4	15.2	—N/a	3.2	—N/a	—N/a	—N/a	4.7	—N/a	2.4	8.6
INSOMAR	28–31 Aug 2023	1,030	15	25	2	—N/a	27	3	3	7	—N/a	4	—N/a	—N/a	—N/a	4	—N/a	10	2
2020 parliamentary election	6 Dec 2020	6.058.625	25.2	28.9	1.0	—N/a	9.1	—N/a	4.9	15.4	4.1	5.7	1.3	0.4	0.0	—N/a	—N/a	4.1	3.7
2019 election	26 May 2019	9.069.822	27.0	22.5			—N/a	—N/a	5.8	22.4	6.4	5.3	—N/a	—N/a	—N/a	—N/a	—N/a	6.6	4.5

== Regional polls ==
=== Bucharest ===
Polling firm	Fieldwork date	Sample size	PNL EPP	PSD S&D	PUSL S&D	ADU			PLUS Renew	PRO S&D	UDMR EPP	AUR ECR	S.O.S. ID	REPER Renew	Others	Lead
Polling firm	Fieldwork date	Sample size	PNL EPP	PSD S&D	PUSL S&D	FD EPP	PMP EPP	USR Renew	PLUS Renew	PRO S&D	UDMR EPP	AUR ECR	S.O.S. ID	REPER Renew	Others	Lead
AtlasIntel	1-5 Jun 2024	2.873	7.6	24.2	—N/a	39.3			—N/a	—N/a	—N/a	12.1	4.7	4.4		15.1
Ipsos	1 Nov-18 Dec 2023	5.400	15.5	39.5	—N/a	1.8	2.3	22.4	—N/a	—N/a	0.7	11.7	2.7	1.4	1.9	17.1
2019 election	26 May 2019	943.118	15.48	16.38		—N/a	7.99	39.89		6.75	0.36	—N/a	—N/a	—N/a	13.15	23.51

== Announced candidates ==
Save Romania Union (USR) and the Alliance for the Union of Romanians (AUR) were the first political parties that announced their official candidates for the European Parliament so far.On 18 December 2023, Save Romania Union officially announced formation of United Right Alliance with Force of the Right (FD) and People's Movement Party (PMP). These three parties ran on a joint list for European Parliament elections.

=== United Right Alliance (USR-PMP-FD) ===
1. Dan Barna
2. Vlad Voiculescu
3. Eugen Tomac
4. Vlad Botoș
5. Cristina-Mădălina Prună
6. Violeta Alexandru
7. Radu Mihail
8. Corina Atanasiu
9. Adriana Cristian
10. George Gima
11. Teodora Stoian
12. Ramona Goga
13. Alina Gîrbea
14. Geta Daniela Drăghici
15. Alina Totti
16. Nicolae Mihai Șvab
17. Emilia Mateescu
18. Ion Belu
19. Gabriela Ferguson
20. Lucia Hang
21. Dan Adrian Pop
22. Lucian Judele
23. Raluca Bercea
24. Ciprian Alexandru
25. Andrei Chirica
26. Răzvan Socolov
27. Adrian Giurgiu
28. Sergiu Grui
29. Daniela Șarpe
30. Aurel Fierăscu
31. Alina Bălășcău
32. Alex Cozma
33. Silviu Andrei
34. Maria Udrescu
35. Mihai Zvîncă
36. Laurențiu Gheorghe
37. Liana Ursa
38. Florin Drăgulin
39. Ion-Marian Lazăr
40. Robert Voicu
41. Alexandru German
42. Irena Pleșoiu
43. Eusebiu Iftode
44. Ioan Bledea

=== Alliance for the Union of Romanians (AUR) ===
1. Cristian Terheș
2. Mugur Mihăescu
3. Monica Iagăr
4. Dan Tanasă
5. Claudiu Târziu
6. Gheorghe Piperea
7. Felicia Akkaya
8. Adrian Axinia
9. Radu Baltasiu
10. Răzvan Biro
11. Ramona-Ioana Bruynseels
12. Paul Costea
13. Peter Costea
14. Ringo Dămureanu
15. Cristina-Emanuela Dascălu
16. Dragoș Dragoman
17. Elena Doboș
18. Cristina Dumitrescu
19. Mihai Enache
20. Raisa Enachi
21. Avram Fițiu
22. Tiberiu Floriș
23. Laura Gherasim
24. Veronica Grosu
25. Silviu Gurlui
26. Ramona-Paula Hotea
27. Mirela Irindea
28. Marius Lulea
29. Nicuşor-Cristian Mancaş
30. Dumitrina Mitrea
31. Elena-Viorica Năstăsoiu
32. Liviu Natea
33. Maria-Lăcrămioara Nicolescu
34. Vlad Olteanu
35. Luminiţa Fernandes
36. Simona-Maria Petcu
37. Ioan-Aurelian Popa
38. Mihai Silviu Popa
39. Șerban-Dimitrie Sturdza
40. Georgiana Teodorescu
41. Aurora Ursu
42. Selena Vîlcu
43. Nicolae Vlahu

=== National Coalition for Romania (PSD-PNL) ===
1. Mihai Tudose
2. Rareș Bogdan
3. Gabriela Firea
4. Dan Motreanu
5. Claudiu Manda
6. Adina Vălean
7. Victor Negrescu
8. Daniel Buda
9. Vasile Dîncu
10. Maria Grapini
11. Siegfried Mureșan
12. Dragoș Benea
13. Mircea Hava
14. Gheorghe Cârciu
15. Gheorghe Falcă
16. Virgil Popescu
17. Dan Nica
18. Alexandru Muraru
19. Mara Mareș

=== Renewing Romania's European Project (REPER) ===
1. Dacian Cioloș
2. Ramona Strugariu
3. Dragoș Pîslaru
4. Oana Cambera
5. Andrei Lupu
6. Andreea Leonte
7. Cristian Presură
8. Simina Tulbure
9. Ciprian Mihali
10. Ana Maria Boghean

=== Social Liberal Humanist Party (PUSL) ===
1. Cristian Barbu
2. Lia Ardelean
3. Mugur Ciuvică

== Results ==
Party	Votes	%	Seats	+/–
PSD–PNL Alliance	4,341,686	48.55	19	–
AUR Alliance	1,334,905	14.93	6	New
United Right Alliance	778,901	8.71	3	–7
Democratic Alliance of Hungarians in Romania	579,180	6.48	2	–
S.O.S. Romania	450,040	5.03	2	New
Renewing Romania's European Project	334,703	3.74	0	New
United Diaspora Party	159,943	1.79	0	New
Social Liberal Humanist Party	132,402	1.48	0	New
Patriots Party	65,440	0.73	0	New
Greater Romania Party	59,272	0.66	0	–
The Right Alternative	40,281	0.45	0	New
Socialist Romania Alliance (PSR–PSDM)	37,119	0.42	0	New
Independents	628,754	7.03	1	–
Total	8,942,626	100.00	33	+1
Valid votes	8,942,626	94.82		
Invalid/blank votes	488,551	5.18		
Total votes	9,431,177	100.00		
Registered voters/turnout	18,025,329	52.32		
Source: BEC
