= Ștefan Mușoiu =

Romanian politician (born 1975)

Ștefan Mușoiu MEP
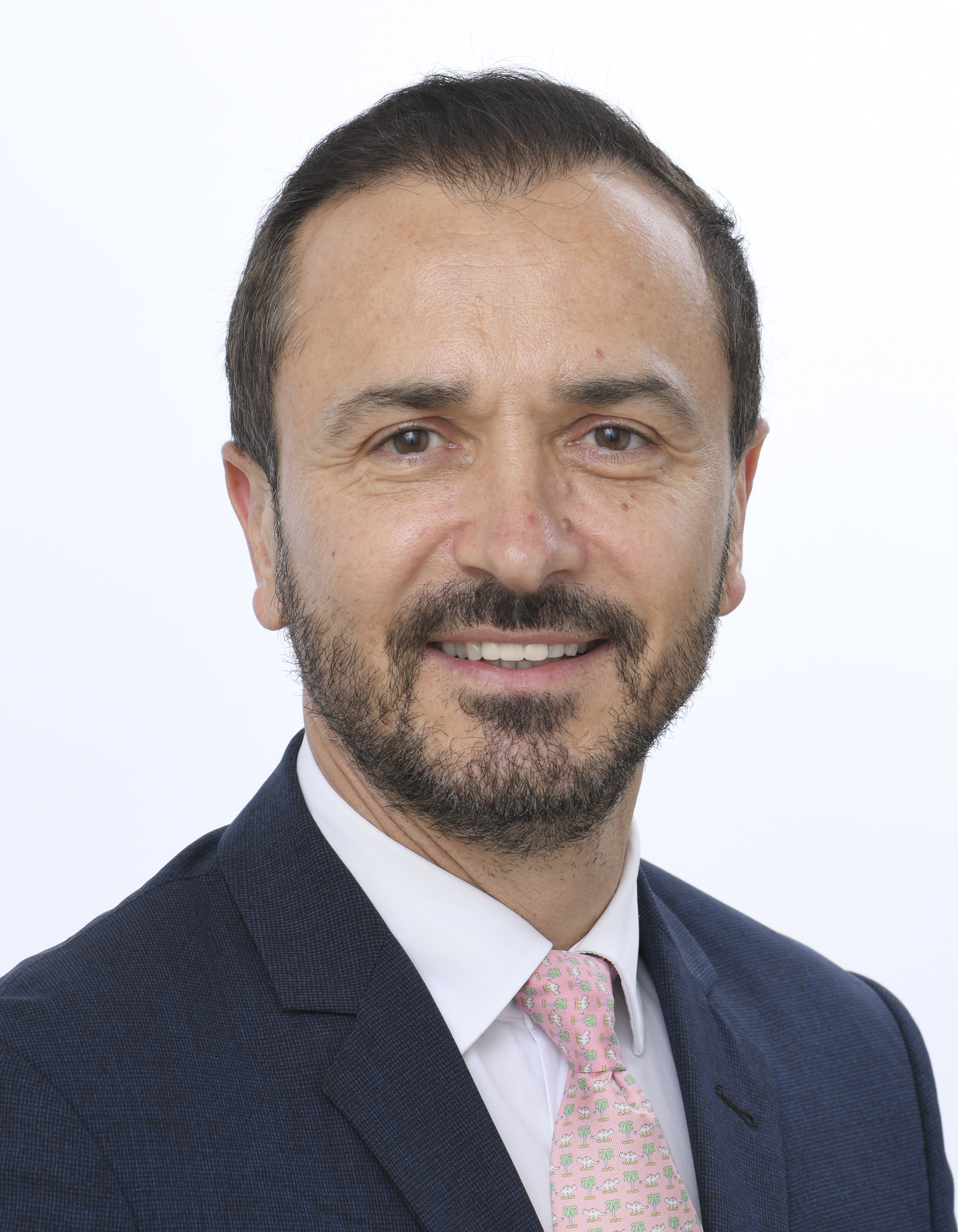
- Mușoiu in 2024

Member of the European Parliament for Romania
- Incumbent
- Assumed office 16 July 2024

Personal details
- Born: 16 June 1975 (age 50)
- Party: Social Democratic Party
- Other political affiliations: Party of European Socialists

Ștefan Mușoiu (born 16 June 1975) is a Romanian politician of the Social Democratic Party who was elected member of the European Parliament in 2024. He served in the Chamber of Deputies from 2016 to 2024.
