= Tudor Ciuhodaru =

Romanian politician

Tudor Ciuhodaru MEP
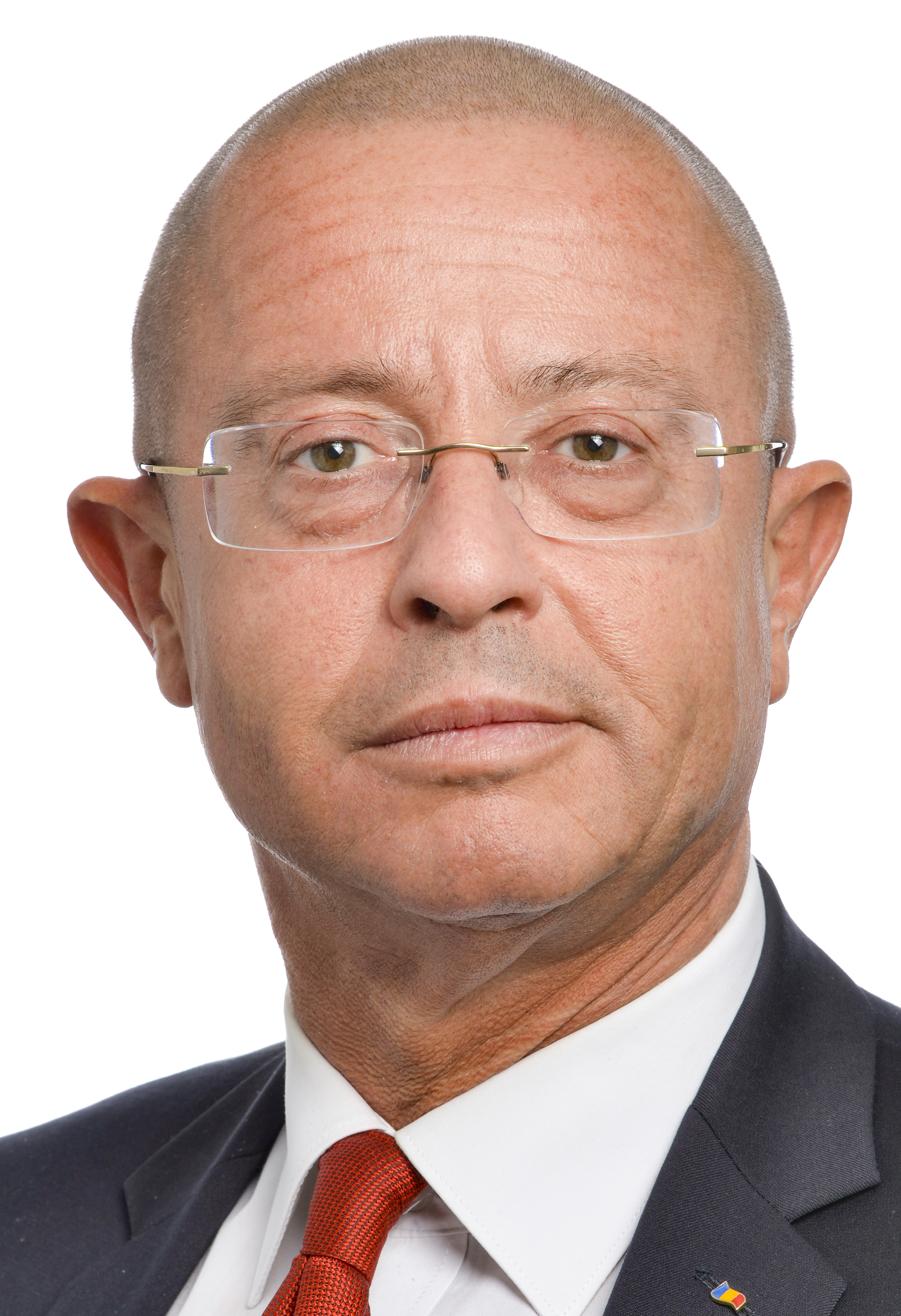

Member of the European Parliament for Romania

Personal details
- Party: Social Democratic Party

Tudor Ciuhodaru is a Romanian medical doctor and politician who has been serving as a Member of the European Parliament for the Social Democratic Party since 2019.

== Member of the European Parliament, 2019–present ==
In parliament, Ciuhodaru has been serving on the Committee on the Environment, Public Health and Food Safety (since 2019) and the Special Committee on the COVID-19 pandemic (since 2022). He was previously a member of the Committee on Civil Liberties, Justice and Home Affairs (2019–2020) and the Special Committee on Beating Cancer (2020–2022).

In addition to his committee assignments, Ciuhodaru has been part of the parliament's delegation for relations with India. He is also a member of the European Parliament Intergroup on Small and Medium-Sized Enterprises (SMEs).
