= Nicolae Ștefănuță =

Vice President of the European Parliament since 2024

Nicolae Ștefănuță MEP
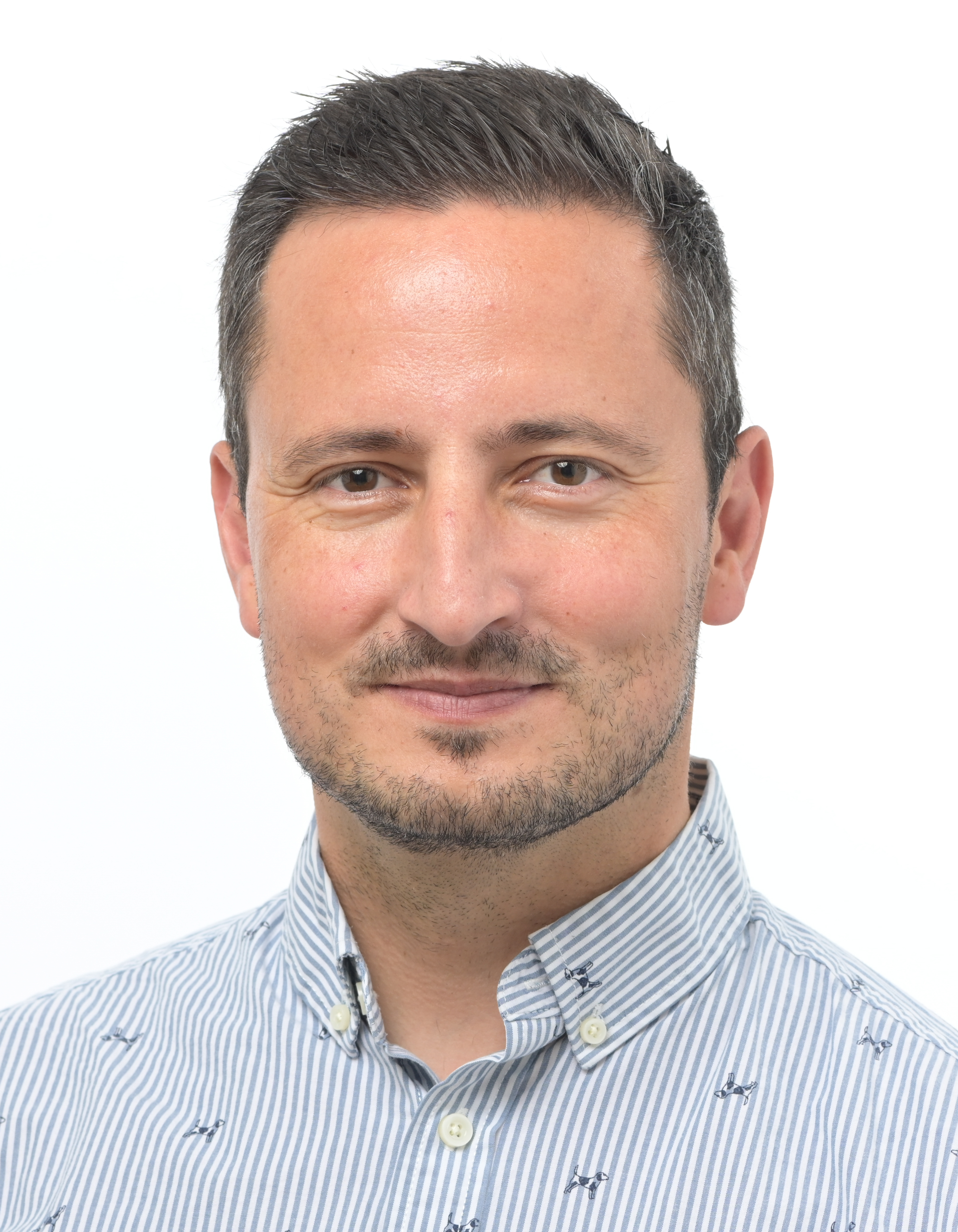
- Ștefănuță in 2024

Vice-President of the European Parliament
- Incumbent
- Assumed office 16 July 2024 Serving with See List
- President: Roberta Metsola

Member of the European Parliament for Romania
- Incumbent
- Assumed office 2 July 2019
- Constituency: Romania

Personal details
- Born: 3 January 1982 (age 44) Rășinari, Socialist Republic of Romania
- Party: Health Education Nature Sustainability Party (2024-present)
- Other political affiliations: Independent (2023-2024); USR PLUS (2019–2023); Democratic Liberal Party (2007–?); Democratic Party (until 2007)
- Education: Georgetown University (MPP); Diplomatic Academy of Vienna (MA); University of Vienna (MA); West University of Timișoara (BEcon)
- Profession: Politician

Nicolae-Bogdănel Ștefănuță or Nicu Ștefănuță (born 3 January 1982) is a Romanian politician, elected as a Member of the European Parliament (MEP) for Romania in the ninth term (2019–2024) of the European Parliament [EP], on the USR PLUS Alliance list, and re-elected in the tenth term (2024–2029) as an independent. He is currently one of the Vice Presidents (VPs) of the European Parliament. In this position, he coordinates portfolios related to foreign affairs, European democracy, relations with civil society and interinstitutional dialogue.

== Political career ==
Nicolae Ștefănuță's first job was as a diplomatic attaché at the Ministry of Foreign Affairs in 2006.

In 2007, he joined the Democratic Liberal Party (PDL), where he was briefly an assistant to MEP Monica Iacob Ridzi, after which, in the same year, he became an official of the European Parliament Committee on Agriculture and Rural Development in the European Parliament.

As a member of USR PLUS, Ștefănuță was elected as MEP in 2019. In parliament, in the first mandate, he served on the Committee on Budgets and on the Committee on the Environment, Public Health and Food Safety. In 2020, he also joined the Special Committee on Beating Cancer. Ștefănuță has been serving as the parliament’s lead rapporteur on the budget of the European Union for 2023.

In addition to his committee assignments, Ștefănuță is part of the parliament's delegation for relations with the United States. He co-chairs the informal MEP Interest Group on Antimicrobial Resistance (AMR). He is also a member of the European Parliament Intergroup on Climate Change, Biodiversity and Sustainable Development, the European Parliament Intergroup on LGBT Rights, the European Parliament Intergroup on Children’s Rights and the European Parliament Intergroup on Traditional Minorities, National Communities and Languages. He is also a member of the Disability Intergroup.

In March 2023, Ștefănuță left the Save Romania Union party and the Renew Europe parliamentary group for the Greens–European Free Alliance as an independent MEP.

After the 2024 European elections, Ștefănuță has become the fourth independent in Romanian history to get a mandate. He got 3.08% of votes, which is above the 3% needed to get in as an independent.

== Political positions ==
In 2021, Ștefănuță joined seven other Romanian MEPs in co-signing a letter to Ursula von der Leyen and Maroš Šefčovič in which they call on the European Commission to stop the United Kingdom from holding EU nationals in immigration removal centres.

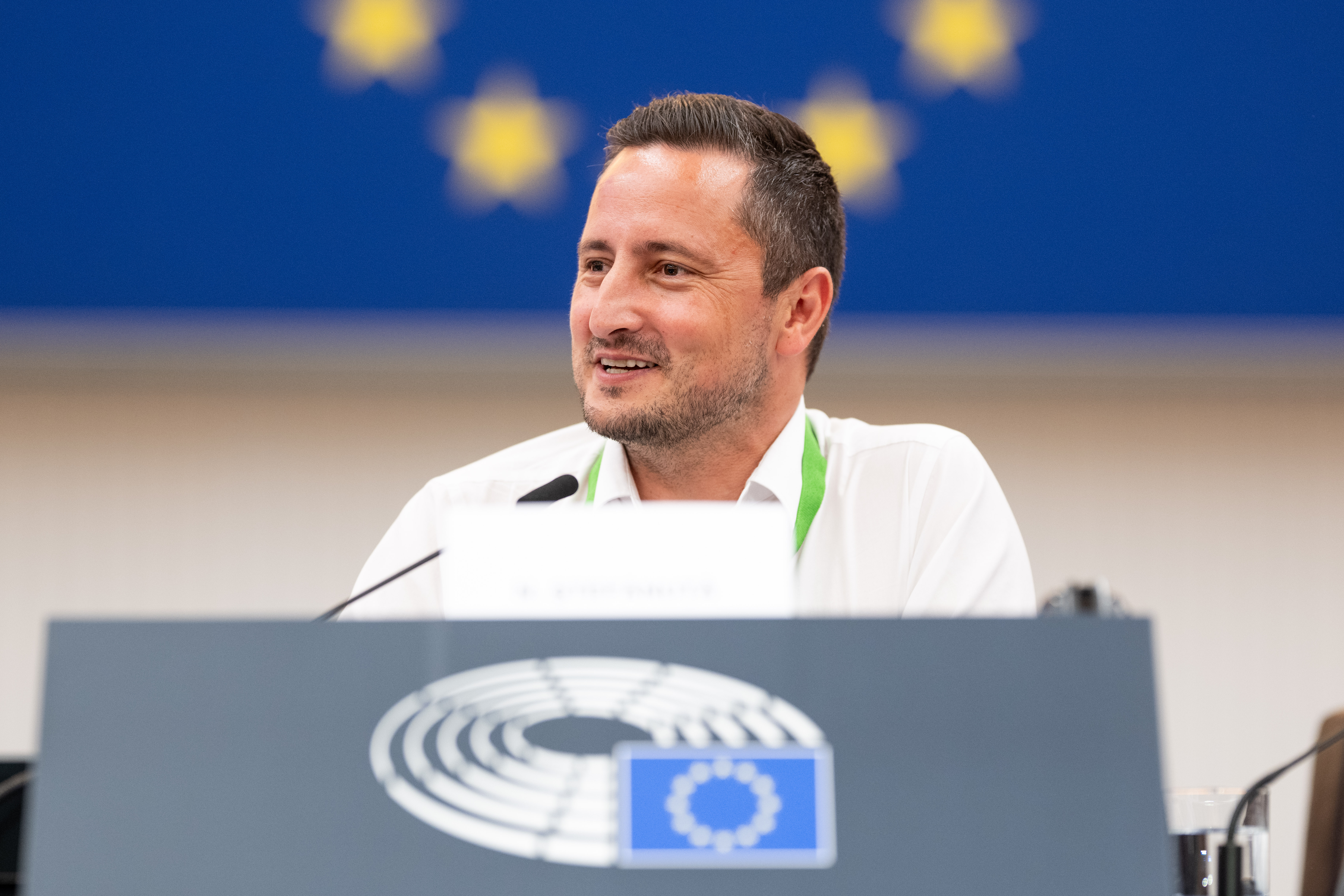
Nicolae Ștefănuță at the European Youth Event 2025

Ștefănuță is a strong supporter of Palestine. He participated in a pro-Palestinian rally in Bucharest on 19 May 2024. Later, on 20 June 2024, the management of the University of Bucharest called the gendarmes to evacuate the pro-Palestine protesters occupying its territory, Ștefănuță compared this event with the invitation of miners by President Ion Iliescu in 1990, which resulted in the infamous June 1990 Mineriad.

Ștefănuță attended the 2024 Bucharest Pride, and identifies as an ally of the LGBTQIA+ community.

In July 2025, Ștefănuță endorsed and signed the Stop Killing Games initiative.
