= Raisa Enachi =

Romanian politician (born 1982)

Member of the Chamber of Deputies
- Incumbent
- Assumed office 21 December 2020
- Constituency: Vaslui

Personal details
- Born: 10 March 1982 (age 44)
- Party: Alliance for the Union of Romanians

Raisa Enachi (born 10 March 1982) is a Romanian politician of the Alliance for the Union of Romanians. Since 2020, she has been a member of the Chamber of Deputies. She served as president of the gender equality committee for two years. In the 2024 European Parliament election, she was a candidate for member of the European Parliament.
