= Oana Cambera =

Romanian politician (born 1980)

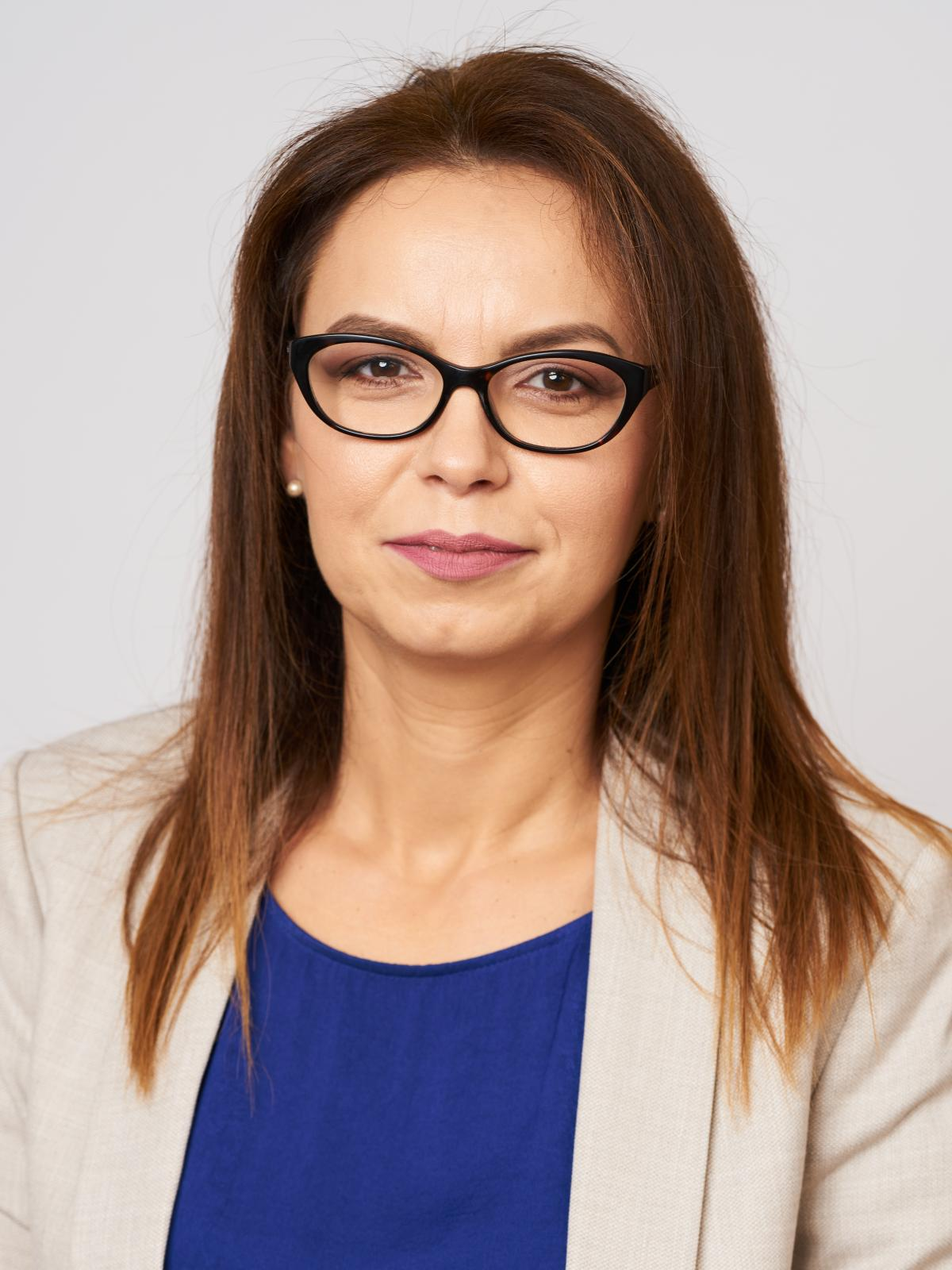
- Cambera in 2020

Member of the Chamber of Deputies
- Incumbent
- Assumed office 21 December 2020
- Constituency: Ilfov

Personal details
- Born: 27 August 1980 (age 45)
- Party: REPER (since 2022)
- Other party: USR (2021–2022); PLUS (2018–2021)

Oana-Alexandra Cambera (born 27 August 1980) is a Romanian politician of Renewing Romania's European Project. Since 2020, she has been a member of the Chamber of Deputies. She joined the Freedom, Unity and Solidarity Party in 2018, and was elected to the chamber as a candidate of the USR PLUS alliance. She switched to the newly founded Renewing Romania's European Project in 2022. In the 2024 European Parliament election, she was a candidate for member of the European Parliament.
