= Adrian-George Axinia =

Romanian politician (born 1977)

Adrian-George Axinia MEP
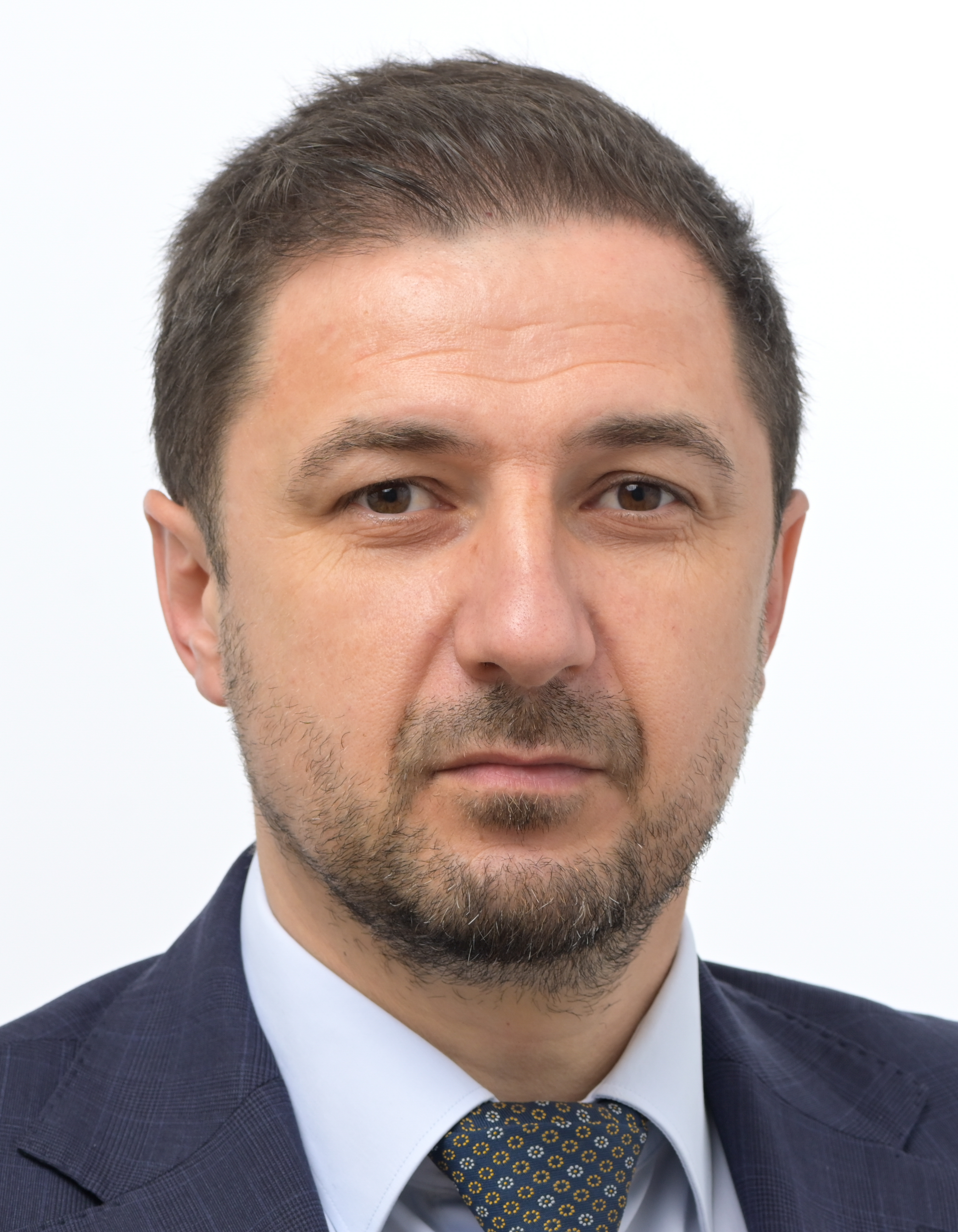
- Official portrait, 2024

Member of the European Parliament for Romania
- Incumbent
- Assumed office 16 July 2024

Member of the Chamber of Deputies
- In office 21 December 2020 – 26 June 2024

Personal details
- Born: 18 October 1977 (age 48) Focșani, Vrancea County, Socialist Republic of Romania
- Party: Alliance for the Union of Romanians
- Other political affiliations: European Conservatives and Reformists
- Education: Technical University of Civil Engineering of Bucharest

Adrian-George Axinia (born 18 October 1977) is a Romanian civil engineer and politician of the Alliance for the Union of Romanians who was elected member of the European Parliament in 2024. He is a vice president of the party and served in the Chamber of Deputies from 2020 to 2024.

== Early life and education ==
Adrian-George Axinia was born on 18 October 1977 in Focșani, Vrancea County, in the Socialist Republic of Romania. Axinia began studies at the Technical University of Civil Engineering of Bucharest in 2006, graduating in 2011.

== Architectural career ==
From 2006 to 2011, Axinia served as director of Ideal Proiect Architecture & Engineering SRL, and between 2012 and 2016 he worked as an engineer in civil, industrial and agricultural constructions for the same company. Between October 2016 and November 2017, she was a construction expert at Ideal Inginerie și Arhitectură SRL.

== Political career ==
=== Champer of Deputies (2020–2024) ===
In the 2020 Romania parliamentary election on 6 December, Axinia was elected a member of the Champer of Deputies for Prahova County, taking office on 21 December.

=== MEP (2024–present) ===
In the 2024 European Parliament election on 9 June of that year, Axinia was elected a member of the European Parliament, joining the European Conservatives and Reformists Group, taking office on 16 July.

His vacant seat in the Champer of Deputies was filled by Petre Pușcașu, who was approved as Axinia's replacement during a vote in the Chamber of Deputies Plenum on 26 June, with 210 votes in favour. Adrian-George Axinia is part of the Committee on Transport and Tourism, Committee of Petition and is a member of the Delegation for relations with Palestine, the Delegation for relations with India and the Delegation to the Euronest Parliamentary Assembly.

In the European Parliament, Axinia has a dynamic activity. In the first year of his mandate, he was the ECR group’s author for the report on the activities of PETI in 2023. He was also appointed as shadow rapporteur for two very important reports in TRAN: Animal Transport and Registration documents for vehicles and vehicle registration data recorded in national vehicle registers. He has repeatedly questioned the European Commission on several pressing issues, ranging from the economic situation and the restructuring of the TAROM company to energy prices and the state of the automotive industry as a result of the implementation of the Green Deal.

== See also ==
- Legislatura 2020-2024 (Camera Deputaților)
- Parliament of Romania
