= Georgiana Teodorescu =

Romanian politician (born 1985)

Georgiana Teodorescu MEP
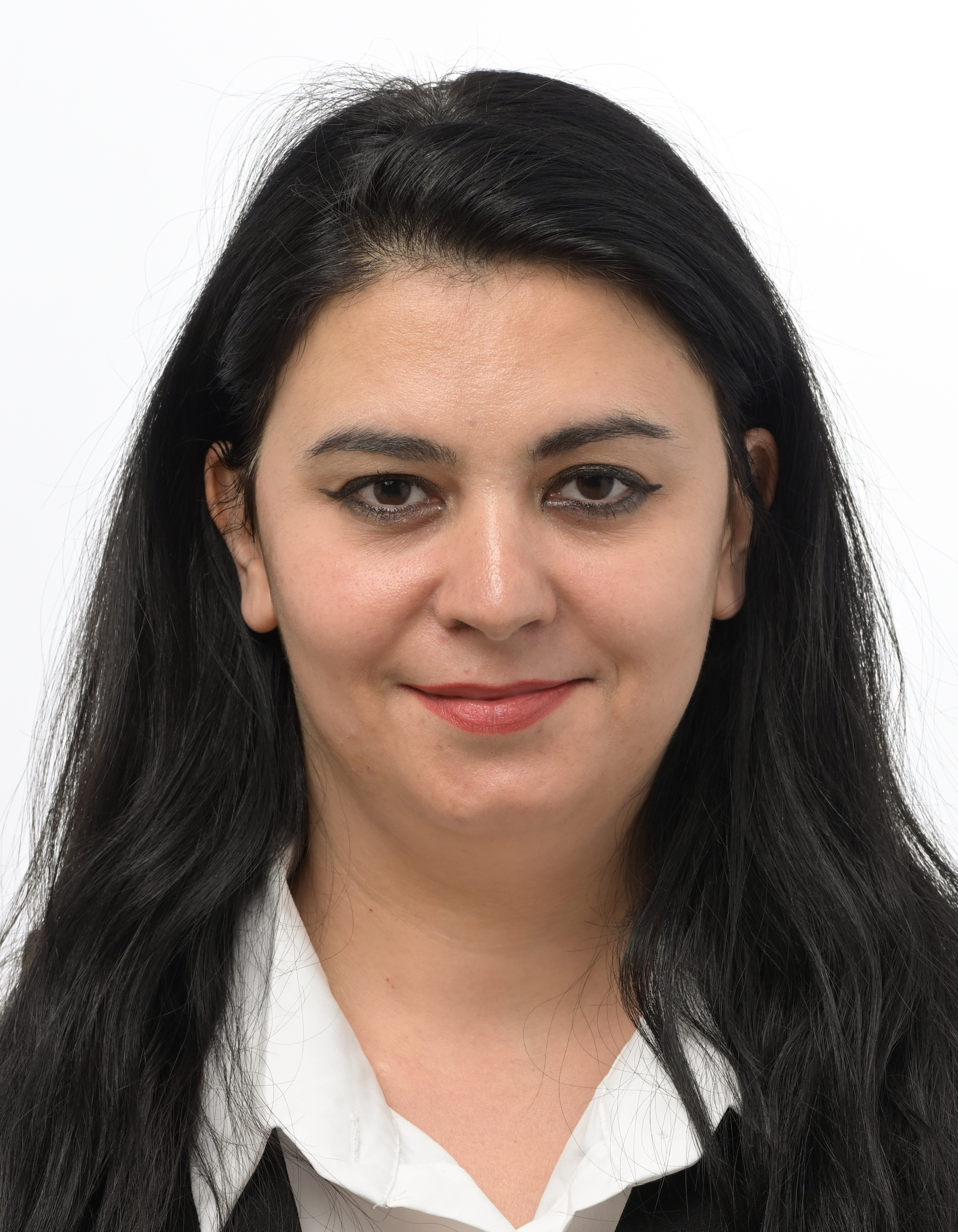
- Official portrait, 2024

Member of the European Parliament for Romania
- Incumbent
- Assumed office 16 July 2024

Personal details
- Born: 19 August 1985 (age 41) Iași, Socialist Republic of Romania
- Party: Alliance for the Union of Romanians
- Other political affiliations: European Conservatives and Reformists
- Education: Alexandru Ioan Cuza University; Nicolae Titulescu University; Titu Maiorescu University
- Occupation: Lawyer
- Website: georgianateodorescu.ro

Maria-Georgiana Teodorescu (born 19 August 1985) is a Romanian lawyer and politician of the Alliance for the Union of Romanians who was elected member of the European Parliament in 2024. She is a lecturer at Titu Maiorescu University and specializes in criminal law.

Born in Iași, Teodorescu studied law at Alexandru Ioan Cuza University from 2004 to 2008. From 2009 to 2010, she served as vice president of the League of Romanian Students Abroad and obtained a Master's degree in business law from Nicolae Titulescu University in Bucharest. She went on to obtain a Ph.D. in criminal law from Titu Maiorescu University in 2015.
