= Șerban-Dimitrie Sturdza =

Romanian politician (born 1967)

Șerban Dimitrie Sturdza MEP
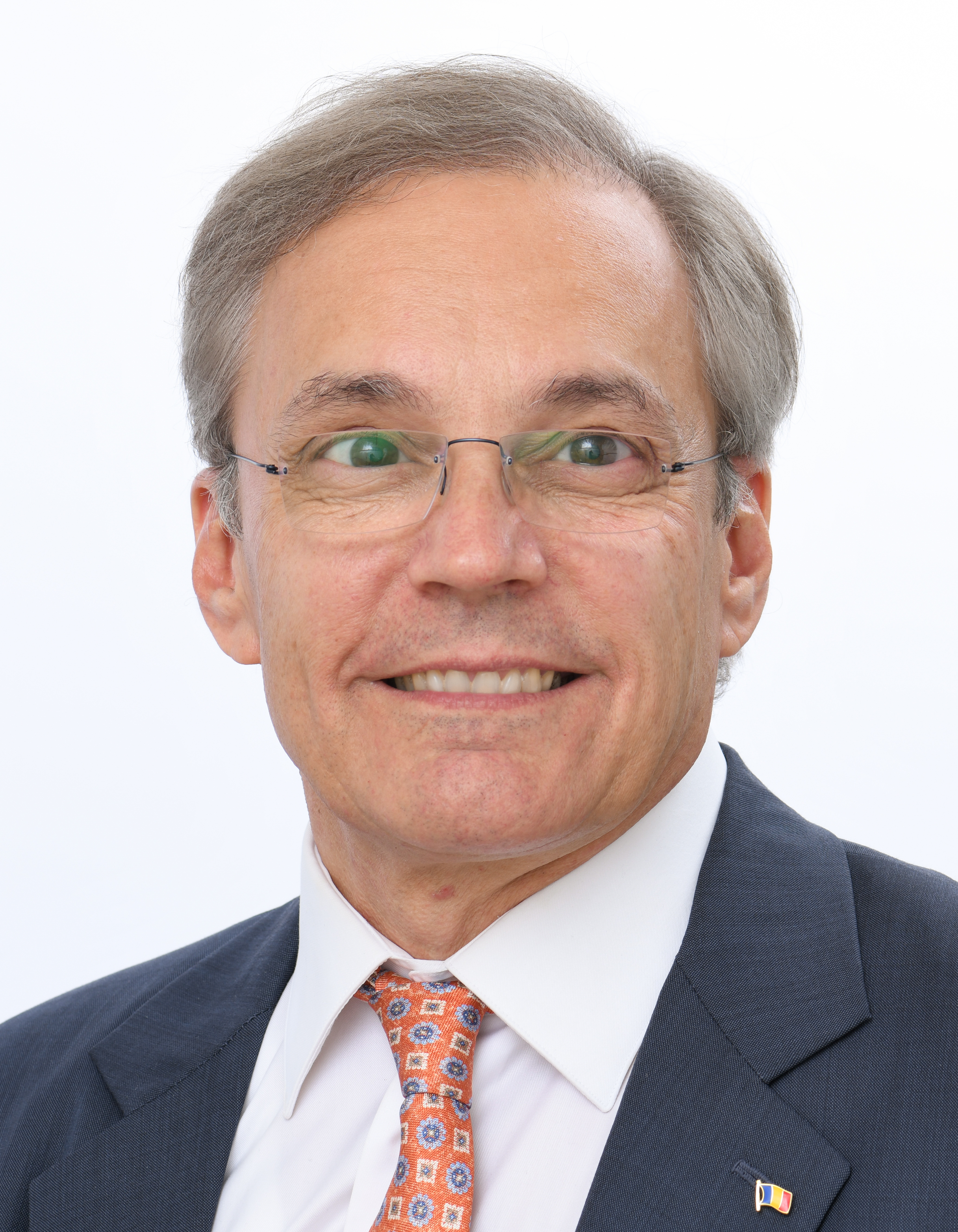
- Official portrait, 2024

Member of the European Parliament for Romania
- Incumbent
- Assumed office 16 July 2024

Personal details
- Born: 30 March 1967 (age 59) Bucharest, Socialist Republic of Romania
- Party: Conservative Action
- Other political affiliations: European Conservatives and Reformists
- Spouse: Dana Andreea Sturdza
- Children: 2
- Parent: Ion Mihail Sturdza (father)
- Relatives: Mihail Sturdza (great-great-great-grandfather)

Șerban Dimitrie Sturdza (born 30 March 1967) is a Romanian politician who was elected member of the European Parliament in 2024. He is the great-great-great-grandson of Mihail Sturdza.

He was born in Bucharest, the son of Ion Mihail Sturdza, and studied art at the Nicolae Tonitza High School in his native city. From 1987 he lived in exile in France, where he was active in exiled opposition circles, including the World Union of Free Romanians organization of Ion Rațiu. In 1992 he moved to Montreal, and in 1998 he returned to Romania. Sturdza brought lawsuits for the return of real estate confiscated from his family by the communist authorities, and became the owner of the Chérica Hotel in Constanța. At the time, he was the Honorary Consul of North Macedonia in Constanța.

He is married to Dana Andreea Sturdza, and has two children.
