= Andrei Lupu =

Romanian politician (born 1992)

Member of the Chamber of Deputies
- Incumbent
- Assumed office 21 December 2020
- Constituency: Prahova

Personal details
- Born: 6 May 1992 (age 33)
- Party: REPER (since 2022)
- Other political affiliations: USR (2021–2022); PLUS (until 2021)

Andrei-Răzvan Lupu (born 6 May 1992) is a Romanian politician of Renewing Romania's European Project. Since 2020, he has been a member of the Chamber of Deputies. He was elected as a member of the Freedom, Unity and Solidarity Party, and became a member of the Save Romania Union when the parties merged. He switched to the newly founded Renewing Romania's European Project in 2022. In the 2024 European Parliament election, he was a candidate for member of the European Parliament.
