= Luis Lazarus =

Romanian politician (born 1967)

Luis Lazarus MEP
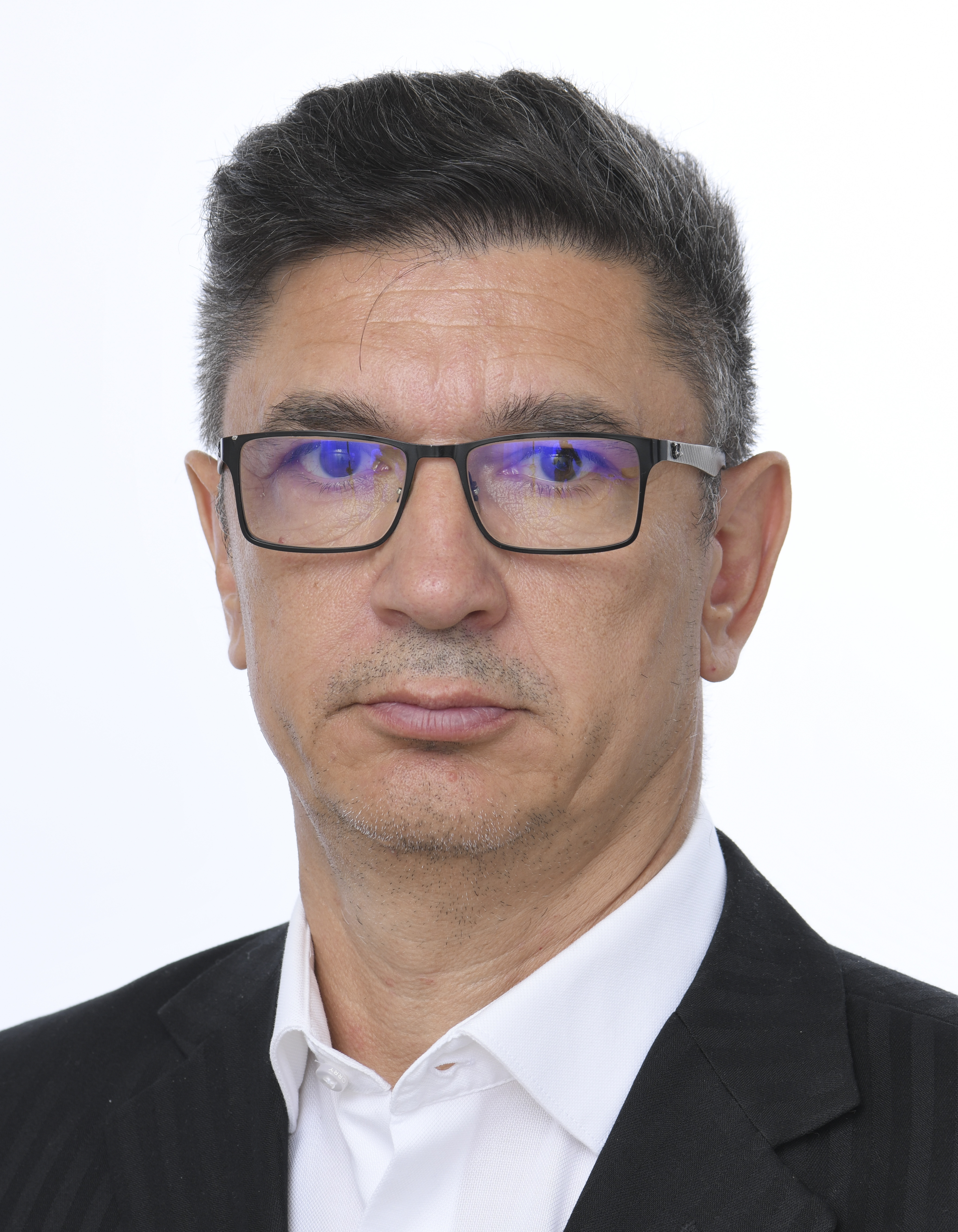
- Official portrait, 2024

Member of the European Parliament for Romania
- Incumbent
- Assumed office 16 July 2024

Personal details
- Born: 12 March 1967 (age 59) Turnu Severin, Socialist Republic of Romania
- Party: Dreptate și Fratie

Luis-Vicențiu Lazarus (born Vasile Tuturigă, 12 March 1967) is a Romanian television personality and politician of Dreptate și Frăție party who was elected member of the European Parliament in 2024. He has worked as a producer and show creator for several television stations.
