= Vlad Botoș =

Romanian politician

Member of the European Parliament for Romania
- In office 10 November 2020 – 16 July 2024

Personal details
- Party: Save Romania Union (USR)(since 2016)
- Other political affiliations: Christian Democratic National Peasants' Party (2006–2012); Civic Force (2012–2012); National Liberal Party (2012–2014)
- Education: Vasile Goldiș Western University of Arad

Vlad Marius Botoș is a Romanian politician that formerly served as a Member of the European Parliament for the Save Romania Union (USR).
