= Gheorghe Cârciu =

Romanian politician (born 1973)

Gheorghe Cârciu MEP
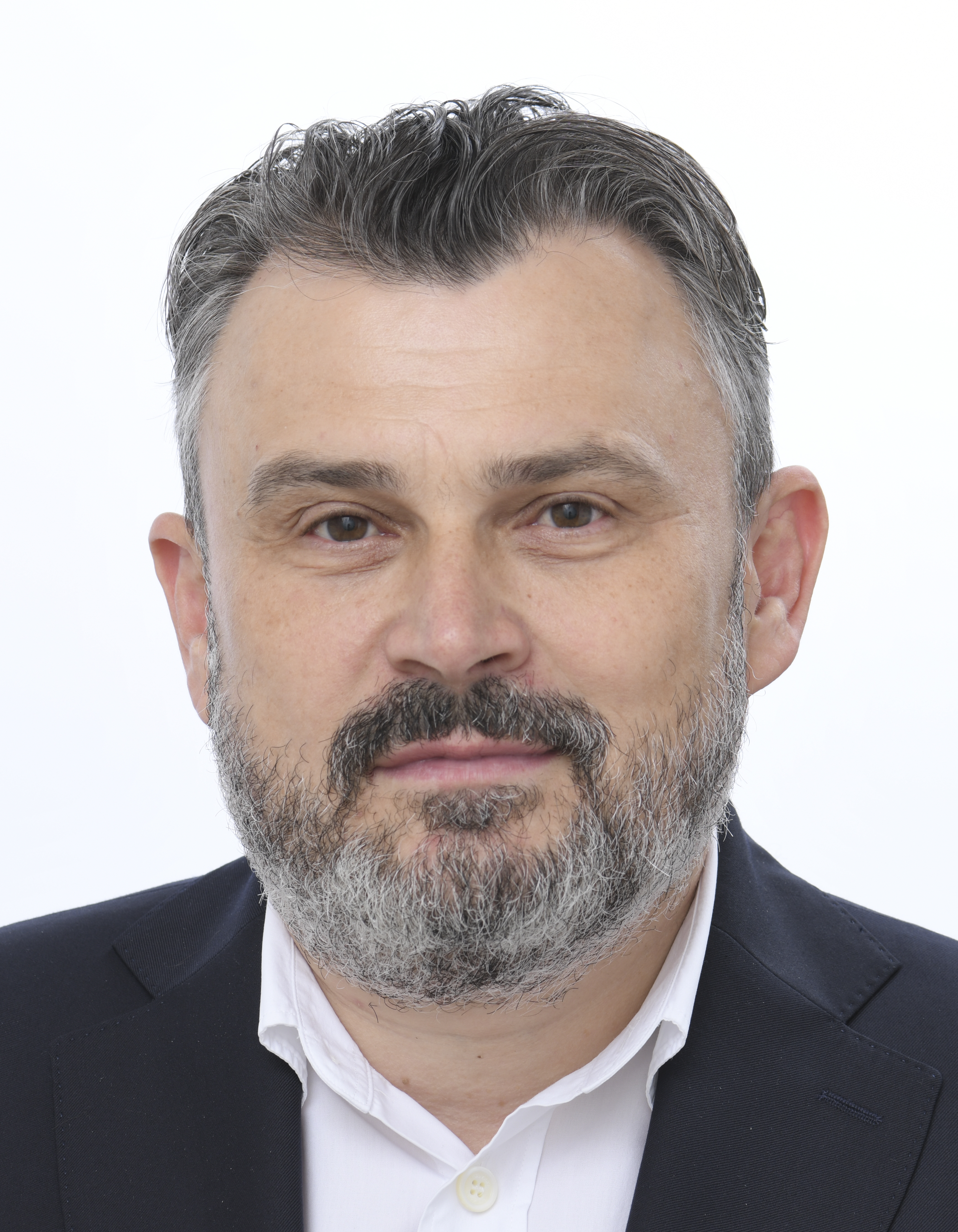
- Official portrait, 2024

Member of the European Parliament for Romania
- Incumbent
- Assumed office 16 July 2024

Personal details
- Born: 14 April 1973 (age 53)
- Party: Social Democratic Party
- Other political affiliations: Party of European Socialists

Gheorghe-Florin Cârciu (born 14 April 1973) is a Romanian politician of the Social Democratic Party who was elected member of the European Parliament in 2024. He served as state secretary at the Department for Romanians Abroad from 2022 to 2024.
