= Singureni, Giurgiu =

Singureni
- Commune
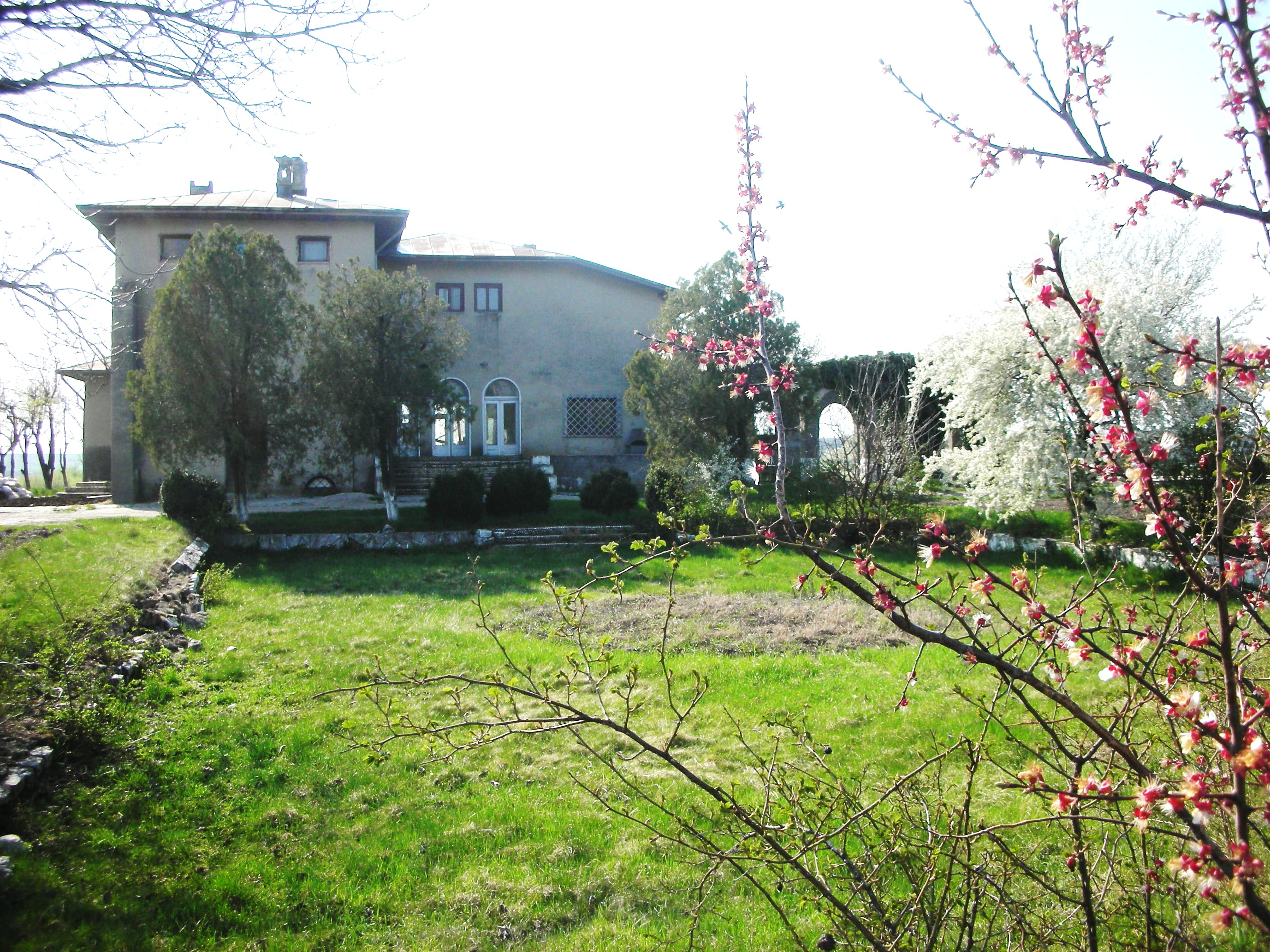

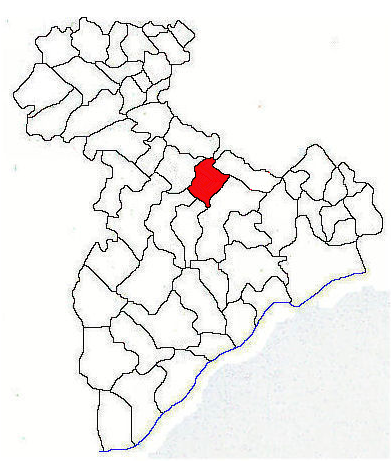
- Location in Giurgiu County

- Location in Romania
- Coordinates: 44°14′N 25°57′E
- Country: Romania
- County: Giurgiu

Government
  - Mayor (2024–2028): Marian Pătuleanu (PSD)
- Area: 51.2 km^{2} (19.8 sq mi)
- Elevation: 60 m (200 ft)
- Population (2021-12-01): 3,083
  - Density: 60.2/km^{2} (156/sq mi)
- Time zone: UTC+02:00 (EET)
  - Summer (DST): UTC+03:00 (EEST)
- Postal code: 87205
- Area code: +(40) 246
- Vehicle reg.: GR
- Website: primariasingurenigr.ro

Singureni is a commune located in Giurgiu County, Muntenia, Romania. It is composed of three villages: Crânguri, Singureni, and Stejaru.

Historical population
Year	Pop.	±%
2002	3,536	—
2011	3,191	−9.8%
2021	3,083	−3.4%
Source: Census data

== Natives ==
- Victor Iliescu (1884–1959), general in World War II
- Gheorghe Piperea (born 1970), lawyer and politician
