= Gheorghe Piperea =

Romanian politician (born 1970)

Gheorghe Piperea MEP
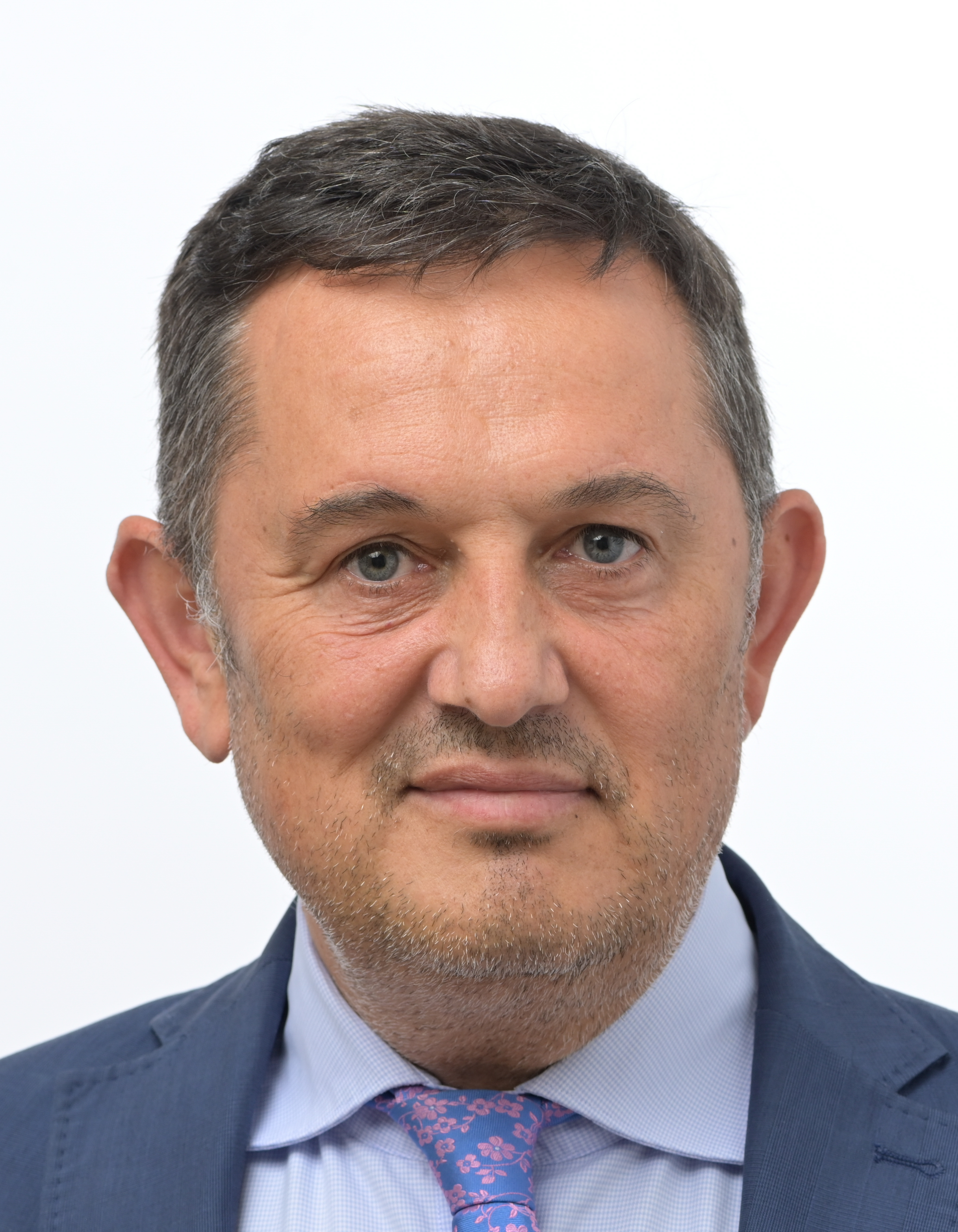
- Official portrait, 2024

Member of the European Parliament for Romania
- Incumbent
- Assumed office 16 July 2024

Personal details
- Born: 1 March 1970 (age 56) Singureni, Giurgiu
- Party: Alliance for the Union of Romanians
- Other political affiliations: European Conservatives and Reformists
- Education: University of Bucharest; Sorbonne University
- Occupation: Lawyer

Gheorghe Piperea (born 1 March 1970) is a Romanian politician of the Alliance for the Union of Romanians who was elected member of the European Parliament in 2024.

He was born in Singureni, Giurgiu County. He studied law at the University of Bucharest (1990–1994) and obtained a doctorate from Sorbonne University and the University of Bucharest (1998–2005). From 1994 to 1996 he served as judge in Sector 1 of Bucharest, and has been a lawyer since 1996. He was a professor at the Law School of the University of Bucharest.

His name was cited in a Financial Times investigation as the MEP declaring the highest additional earnings (3.2 million lei, or 641,000€) which he reportedly derives from his equity in an insolvency firm, despite "leading negotiations for his group on insolvency laws."
