= Ringo Dămureanu =

Romanian politician (born 1973)

Member of the Chamber of Deputies
- Incumbent
- Assumed office 21 December 2020
- Constituency: Dolj

Personal details
- Born: 18 August 1973 (age 53) Craiova, Socialist Republic of Romania
- Party: Alliance for the Union of Romanians
- Education: University of Craiova; National University of Political Studies and Public Administration

Ringo Dămureanu (born 18 August 1973) is a Romanian politician of the Alliance for the Union of Romanians. He was elected member of the Chamber of Deputies in the 2020 parliamentary election. Since 2021, he has served as president of the constitutionality committee. In 2024, he was a candidate for president of the Dolj County Council.

Born in Craiova, he attended from 1987 to 1991 the Frații Buzești National College and from 1992 to 1997 the University of Craiova, graduating with a degree in computer engineering. From 2007 to 2009, he pursued his studies at the National University of Political Studies and Public Administration in Bucharest, obtaining a Master's degree in law and public affairs.
