= Lóránt Vincze =

Romanian politician

Lóránt Vincze MEP
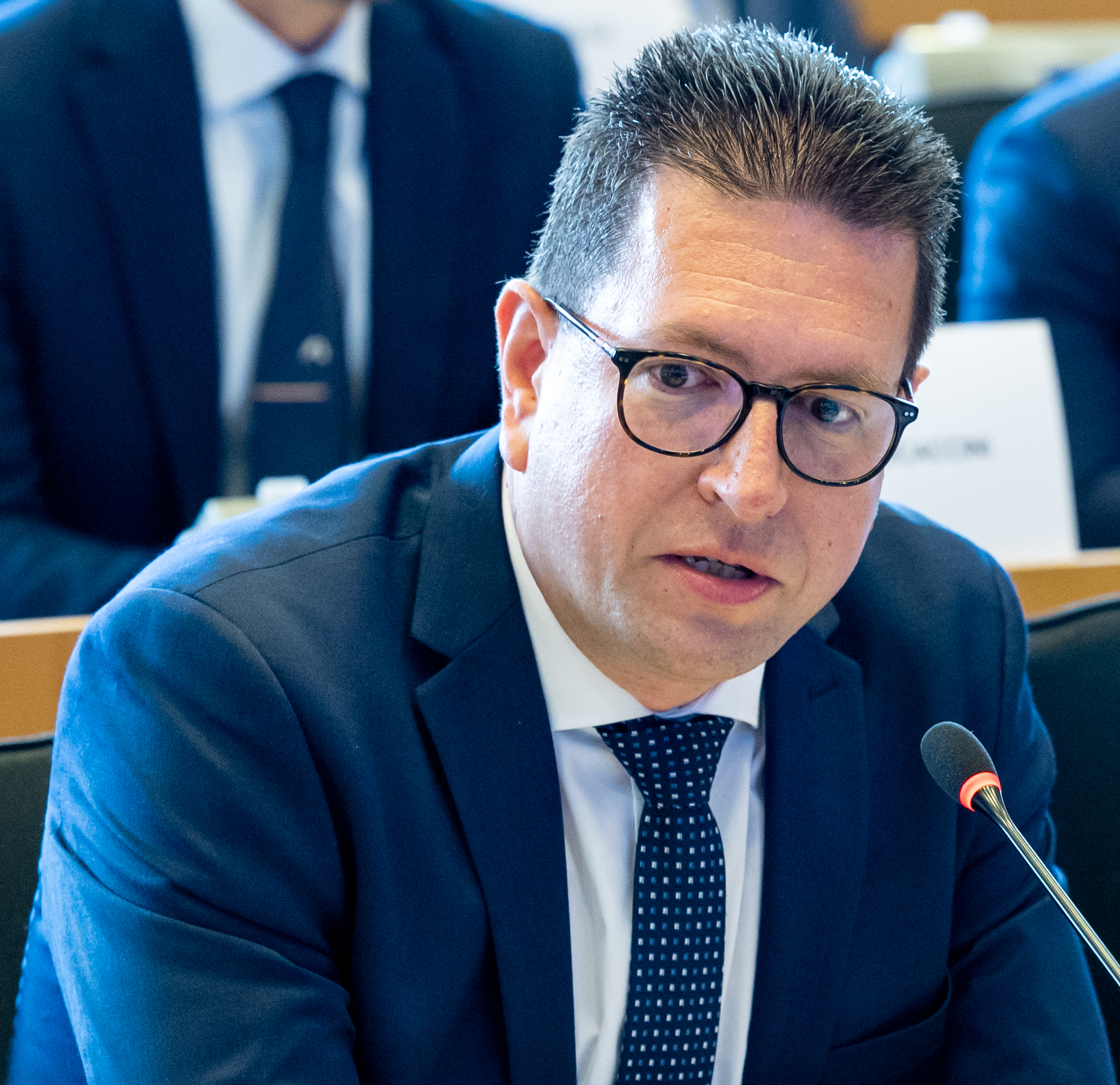
- Vincze in 2024

Member of the European Parliament for Romania
- Incumbent
- Assumed office 2 July 2019

Personal details
- Born: 3 November 1977 (age 48) Târgu Mureș, Romania
- Party: Democratic Alliance of Hungarians in Romania (UDMR/RMDSZ); European People's Party (EPP)
- Education: Babeș-Bolyai University; University of Bucharest

Lóránt-György Vincze (born 3 November 1977) is a Romanian politician currently serving as a Member of the European Parliament on behalf of the Democratic Alliance of Hungarians in Romania (UDMR/RMDSZ).

He was born in Târgu Mureș, completed a BA (journalism, 2000) at Babeș-Bolyai University in Cluj-Napoca and an MA (Public administration and e-government, 2006) at the University of Bucharest. Vincze belongs to the Hungarian minority in Romania, and also serves as the president of the Federal Union of European Nationalities (FUEN).
