= Dan Motreanu =

Romanian politician

Dan Motreanu MEP
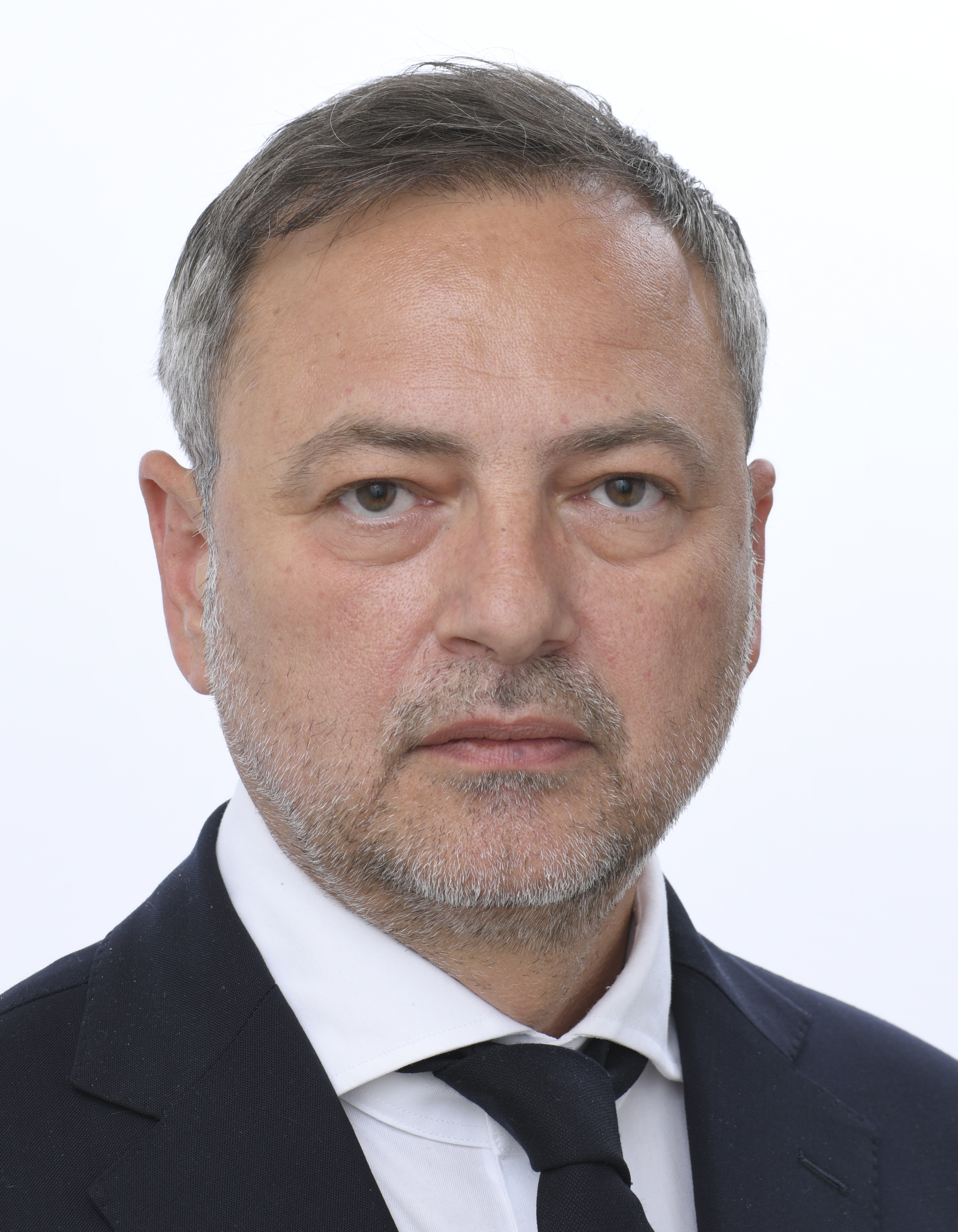
- Official portrait, 2024

Member of the European Parliament for Romania
- Incumbent
- Assumed office 2 July 2019

Minister of Agriculture, Forests and Rural Development
- In office 6 December 2006 – 5 April 2007
- Prime Minister: Călin Popescu-Tăriceanu
- Preceded by: Gheorghe Flutur
- Succeeded by: Decebal Traian Remeș

Personal details
- Born: 11 September 1970 (age 56) Orăștie, Hunedoara County, Socialist Republic of Romania
- Party: National Liberal Party
- Education: West University of Timișoara

Dan-Ștefan Motreanu MEP (born 11 September 1970) is a Romanian politician who has been serving as a Member of the European Parliament (MEP) since 2019. A member of the National Liberal Party (PNL), he sits with the EPP group.

== Biography and career ==
Motreanu was born in Orăștie and graduated from the West University of Timișoara in 1995 with a degree in Philosophy and History. He later completed postgraduate studies at Babeș-Bolyai University (2000) and the National Defence College (2005). Before entering public office, he worked as a high school teacher and as a regional correspondent for the Mediafax news agency.

Motreanu joined the PNL in 1990 and served in the Romanian Chamber of Deputies from 2004 to 2016, holding roles including Vice-President of the Chamber. From December 2006 to April 2007, he was the Minister for Agriculture, Forestry, and Rural Development in the first Tăriceanu cabinet, overseeing Romania's transition into the European Union's agricultural framework. He has also served as General Secretary and First Vice President of the PNL.

Motreanu was elected to the European Parliament in 2019 and re-elected in 2024. He serves as a full member of the Committee on Regional Development (REGI) and the Committee on the Environment, Public Health and Food Safety (ENVI).
