= Rareș Bogdan =

Romanian politician

Rareș Bogdan MEP
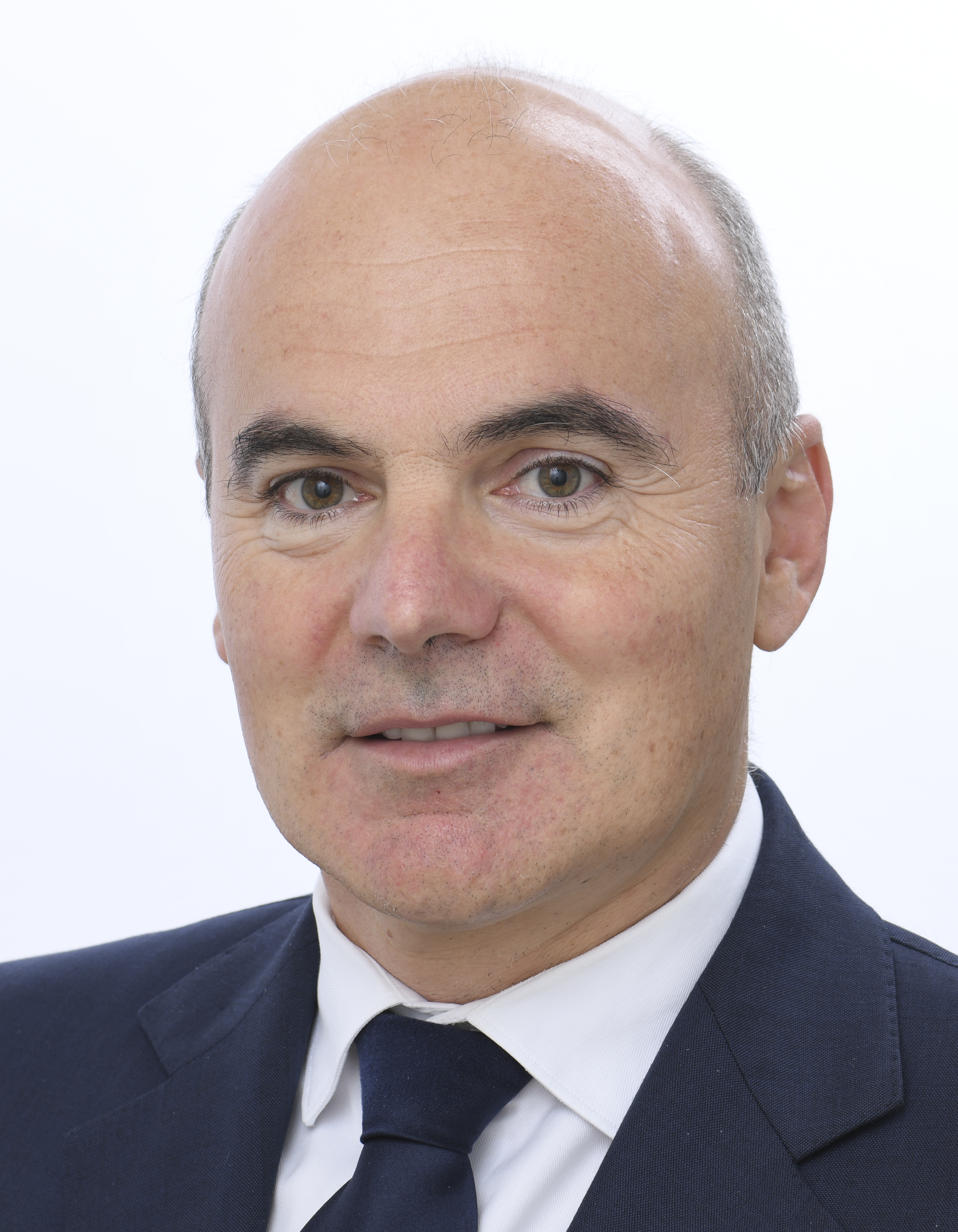
- Official portrait, 2024

Member of the European Parliament for Romania
- Incumbent
- Assumed office 2 July 2019

Personal details
- Born: 17 September 1974 (age 52) Ocna Mureș, Alba County, Romania
- Party: National Liberal Party (PNL); European People's Party (EPP)
- Education: Babeș-Bolyai University (UBB)

Ioan-Rareș Bogdan (born 17 September 1974) is a conservative Romanian politician who has been a PNL member of the European Parliament for Romania since 2019. He was the leader of the National Liberal Party's electoral list for the 2019 elections. He sits with the European People's Party group (EPP for short).

He self-identifies as a Christian-conservative and nationalist.

== Personal life ==
Rareș Bogdan's father, Ioan Bogdan, was a local councillor in Ocna Mureș between 1996 and 2000 and a member of the Social Democracy Party of Romania (PDSR).

He was born in Ocna Mureș.

After the 2026 PNL national congress he was kicked out of the party for his loyalty to the Social Democrats.
