= Claudiu Manda =

Romanian politician

Claudiu Manda MEP
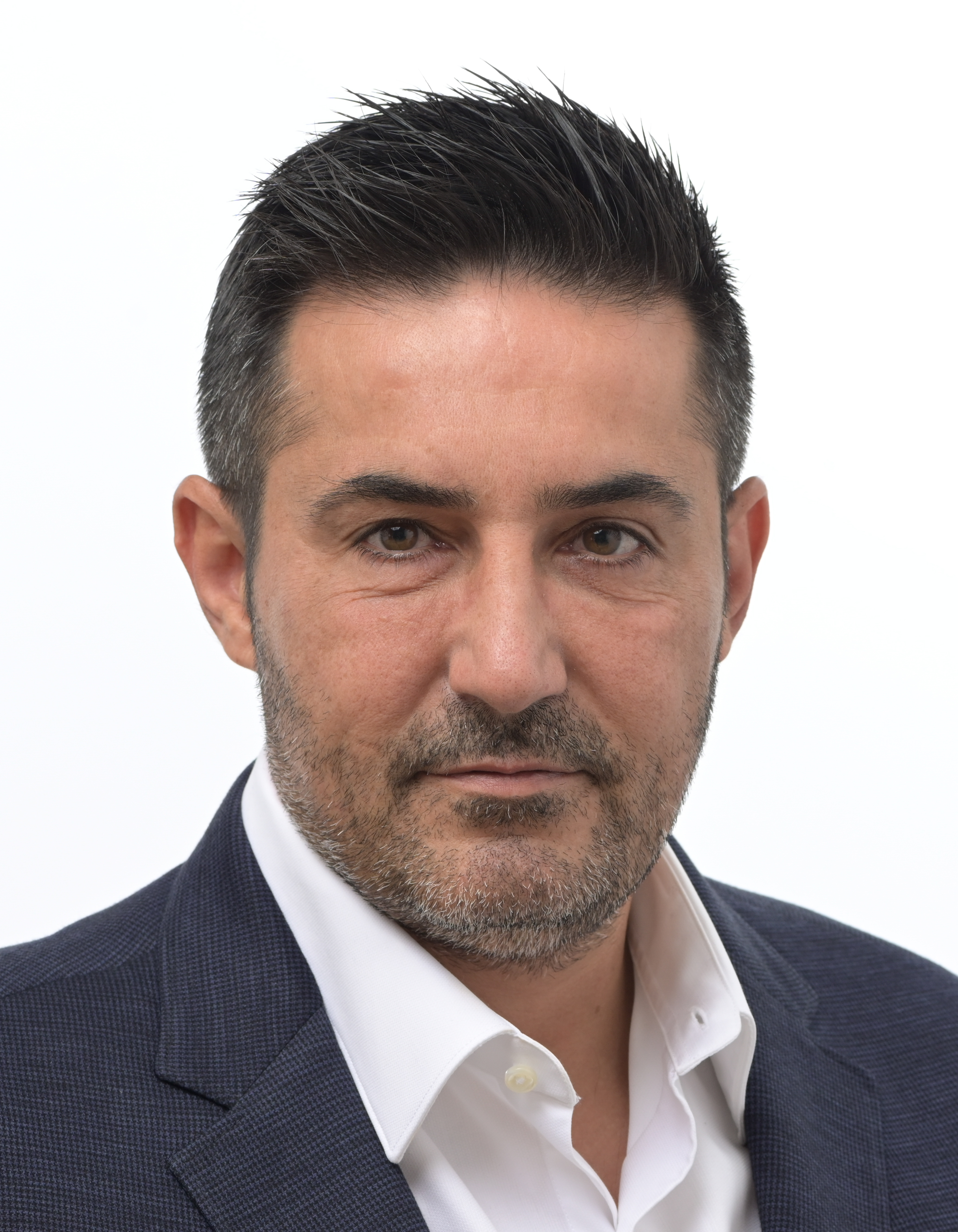
- Official portrait, 2024

Member of the European Parliament for Romania
- Incumbent
- Assumed office 2 July 2019

Personal details
- Party: Social Democratic Party

Claudiu Manda (born 20. December 1975) is a Romanian politician currently serving as a Member of the European Parliament for the Social Democratic Party. Since December 2025, he also serves as Secretary of the Romanian Social Democratic Party (PSD).
