= Simina-Geanina-Daniela Tulbure =

Romanian politician (born 1992)

Member of the Chamber of Deputies
- Incumbent
- Assumed office 21 December 2020
- Constituency: No 43 Diaspora

Personal details
- Born: July 4, 1992 (age 33)

Simina-Geanina-Daniela Tulbure is a Romanian politician who is member of the Chamber of Deputies

== Biography ==
She was elected in 2020.
