= Dragoș Benea =

Romanian politician

Dragoș Benea MEP
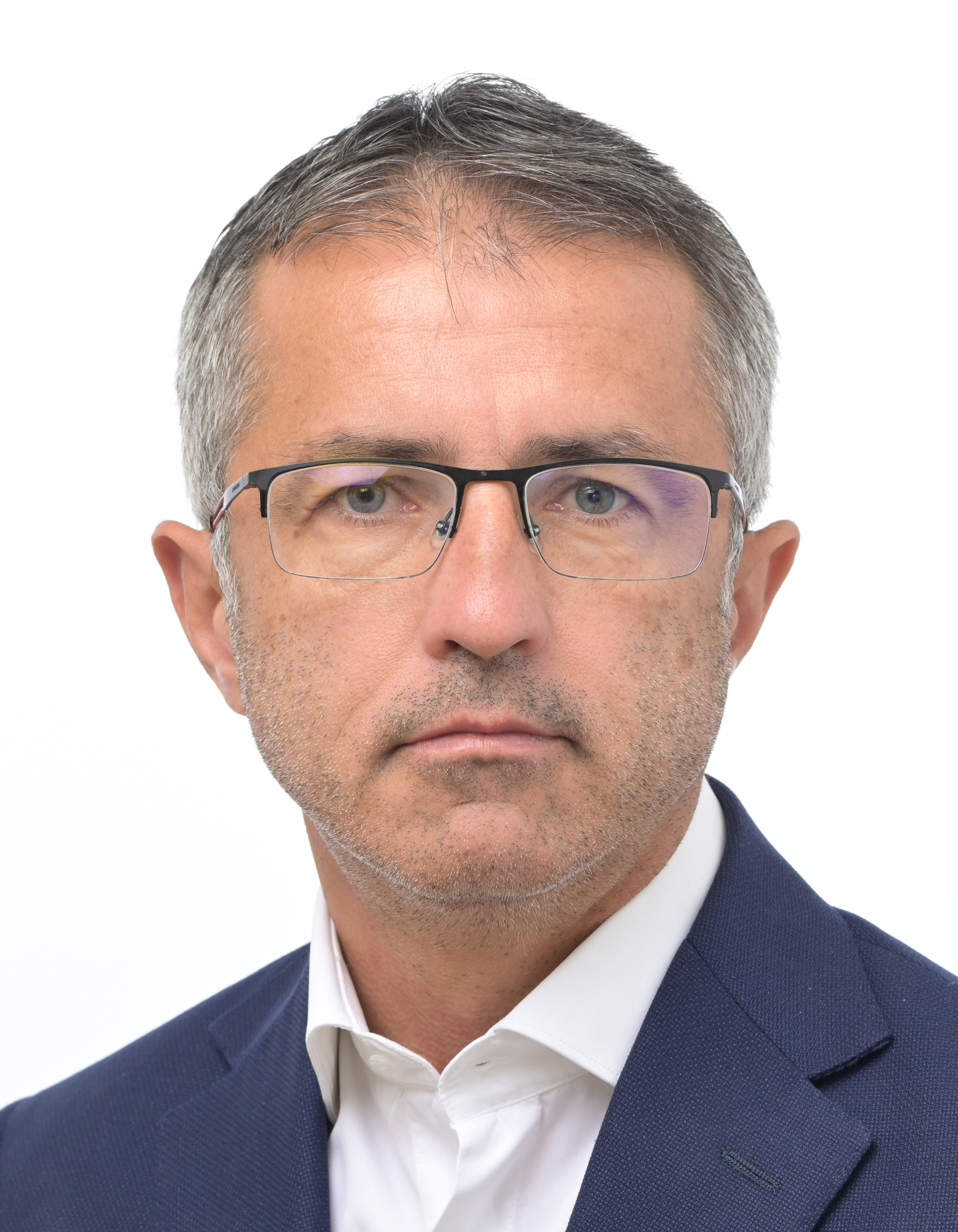
- Official portrait, 2024

Member of the European Parliament for Romania
- Incumbent
- Assumed office 2 July 2019

Senator of Romania
- In office 11 December 2016 – 1 July 2019

Personal details
- Born: 18 December 1975 (age 50)
- Died: Bacău, Bacău County, Socialist Republic of Romania
- Party: Social Democratic Party
- Education: Vasile Alecsandri University of Bacău

Adrian Dragoș Benea (born December 18, 1975) is a Romanian politician currently serving as a Member of the European Parliament for the Social Democratic Party.

He was born in Bacău and holds a degree in Marketing and Commerce from the University of Bacău. From 2000 to 2004 he served as Deputy Mayor of Bacău and from 2004 to 2016 he was President of the Bacău County Council. At the 2016 Romanian parliamentary election he was elected to the Senate of Romania, where he served until 2019.
