= Mugur Ciuvică =

Romanian political analyst and presidential aide

Mugur Ciuvică (Romanian pronunciation: ['mugur ʧu'vikə]) is a former presidential aide of ex-President Emil Constantinescu and a controversial Romanian political analyst.

In 2002, Ciuvică was briefly detained and subsequently placed under investigation for distributing via the Internet a report entitled Armageddon II, which alleged that then-Romanian Prime Minister Adrian Năstase was involved in corrupt business affairs. Rights groups said that the indictment undermined freedom of expression.

Ciuvică is the leader of the Group for Political Investigations. Ciuvică appears frequently on Antena 3 news channel. In July 2013, he ranked second among Romanian public figures with the highest number of presences in TV studios.

Ciuvică is a frequent critique of former President Traian Băsescu. In April 2009, Mircea Băsescu, President Traian Băsescu's brother, threatened to beat Ciuvică.
