= Gheorghe Falcă =

Romanian politician and engineer

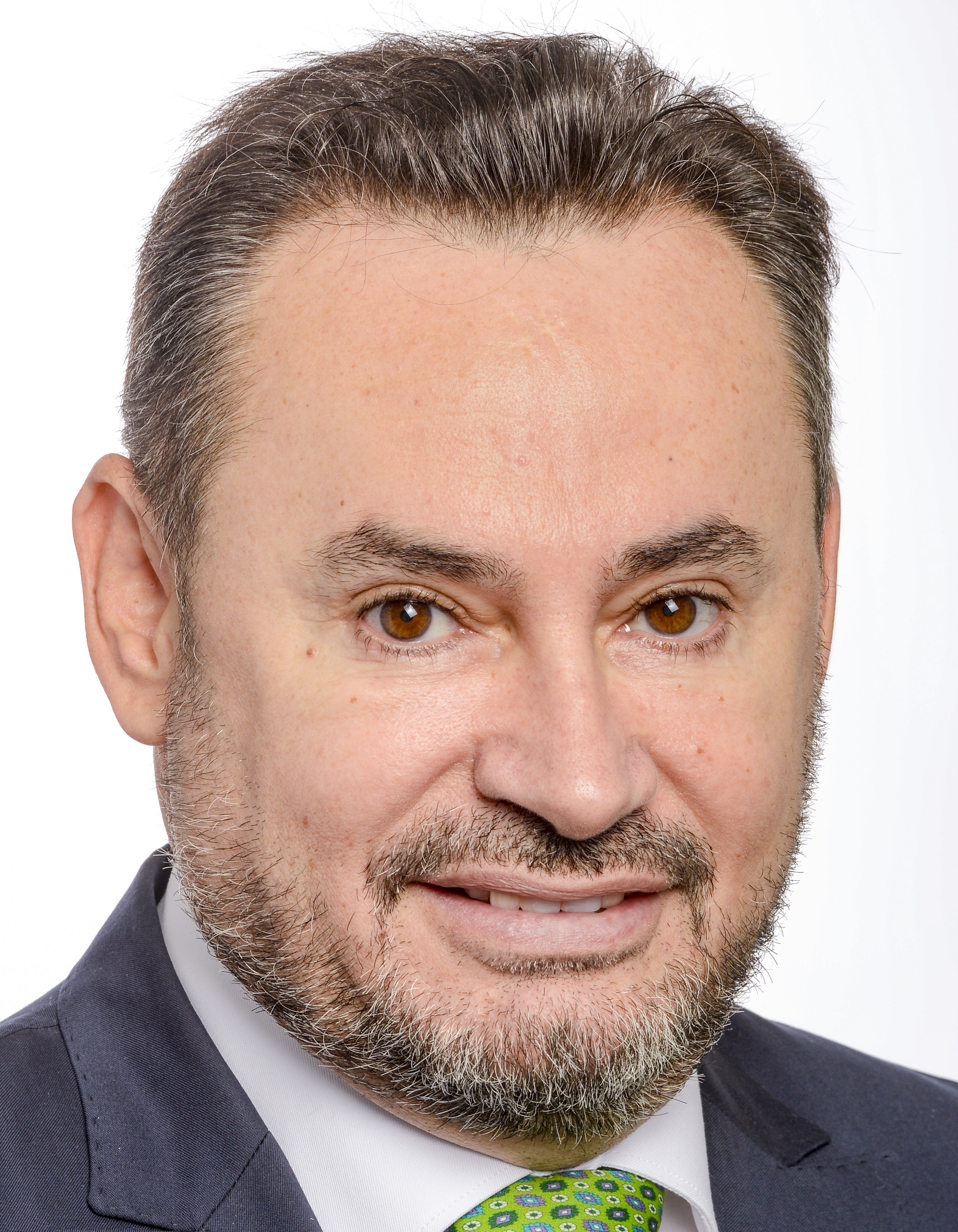
Official portrait, 2024

Gheorghe Falcă (born 22 January 1967) is a Romanian politician and engineer. He was the mayor of Arad from the summer of 2004 up until 2019. He is currently warranted as a MEP on behalf of Romania in the European Parliament.
