= Virgil-Daniel Popescu =

Romanian politician (born 1968)

Virgil-Daniel Popescu MEP
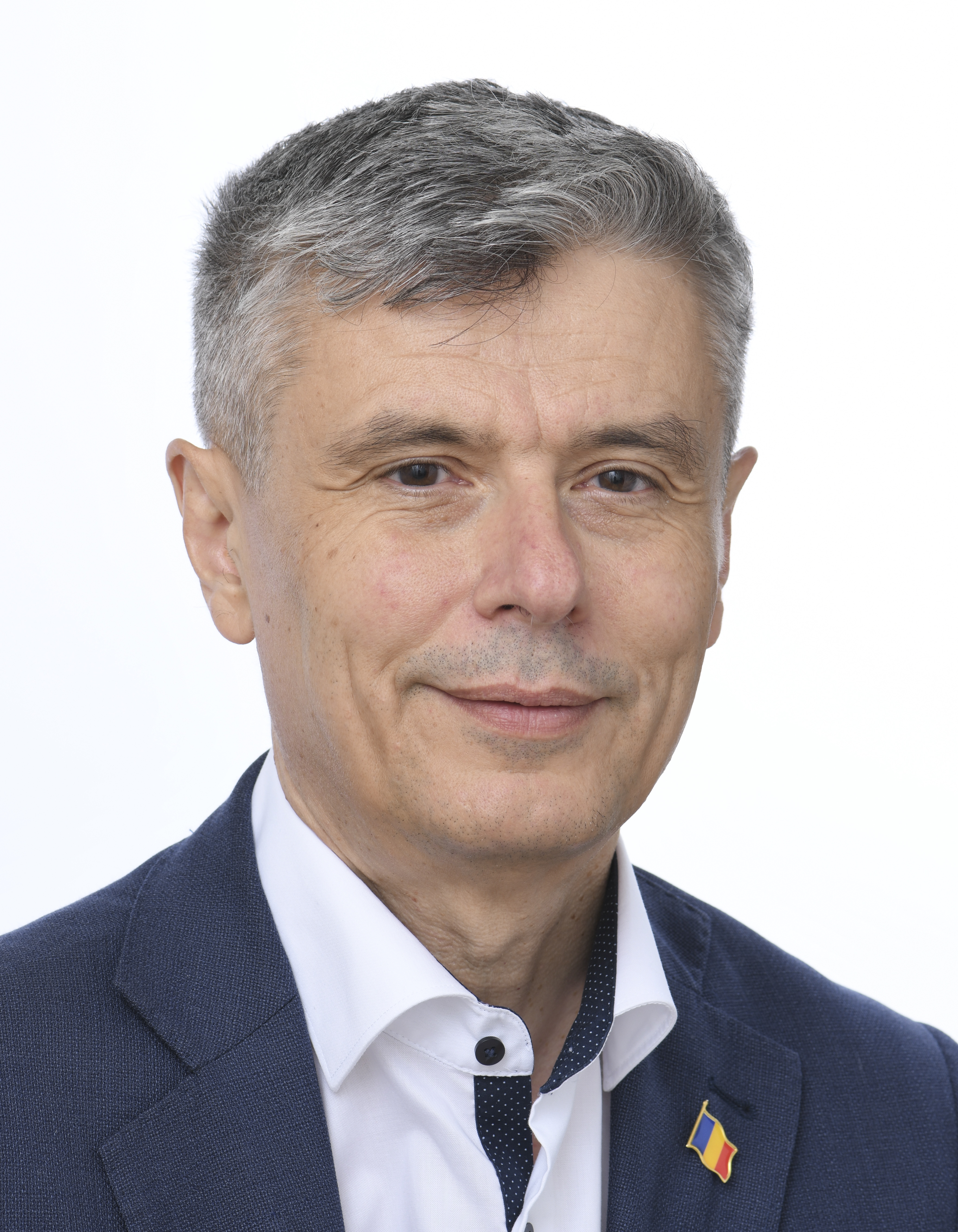
- Official portrait, 2024

Minister of Energy
- In office 4 November 2019 – 15 June 2023
- Prime Minister: Ludovic Orban; Nicolae Ciucă (Acting); Florin Cîțu; Nicolae Ciucă

Personal details
- Born: April 25, 1968 (age 58) Drobeta-Turnu Severin, Mehedinți County, Romania
- Party: National Liberal Party (PNL)
- Education: Politehnica University of Bucharest

Virgil-Daniel Popescu (born April 25, 1968) is a Romanian politician who served as Minister of Energy in the Ciucă Cabinet, led by Prime Minister Nicolae Ciucă, from 4 November 2019 to 15 June 2023. He previously served in the first and second cabinets led by Ludovic Orban, as well as in the cabinet led by Florin Cîțu.

Born in Drobeta-Turnu Severin, he graduated the Faculty of Automatic Control and Computers of the Politehnica University of Bucharest in 1991. He holds a doctor's degree in Management from the Faculty of Economic Sciences at the University of Craiova (2000) and a master's degree in Business Analysis, Diagnosis and Assessment from the Faculty of Economy and Business Management at the University of Craiova (2009). Since December 2016, he has been representing Mehedinți County in the Chamber of Deputies, as a member of the National Liberal Party.
