= Mircea Hava =

Romanian politician

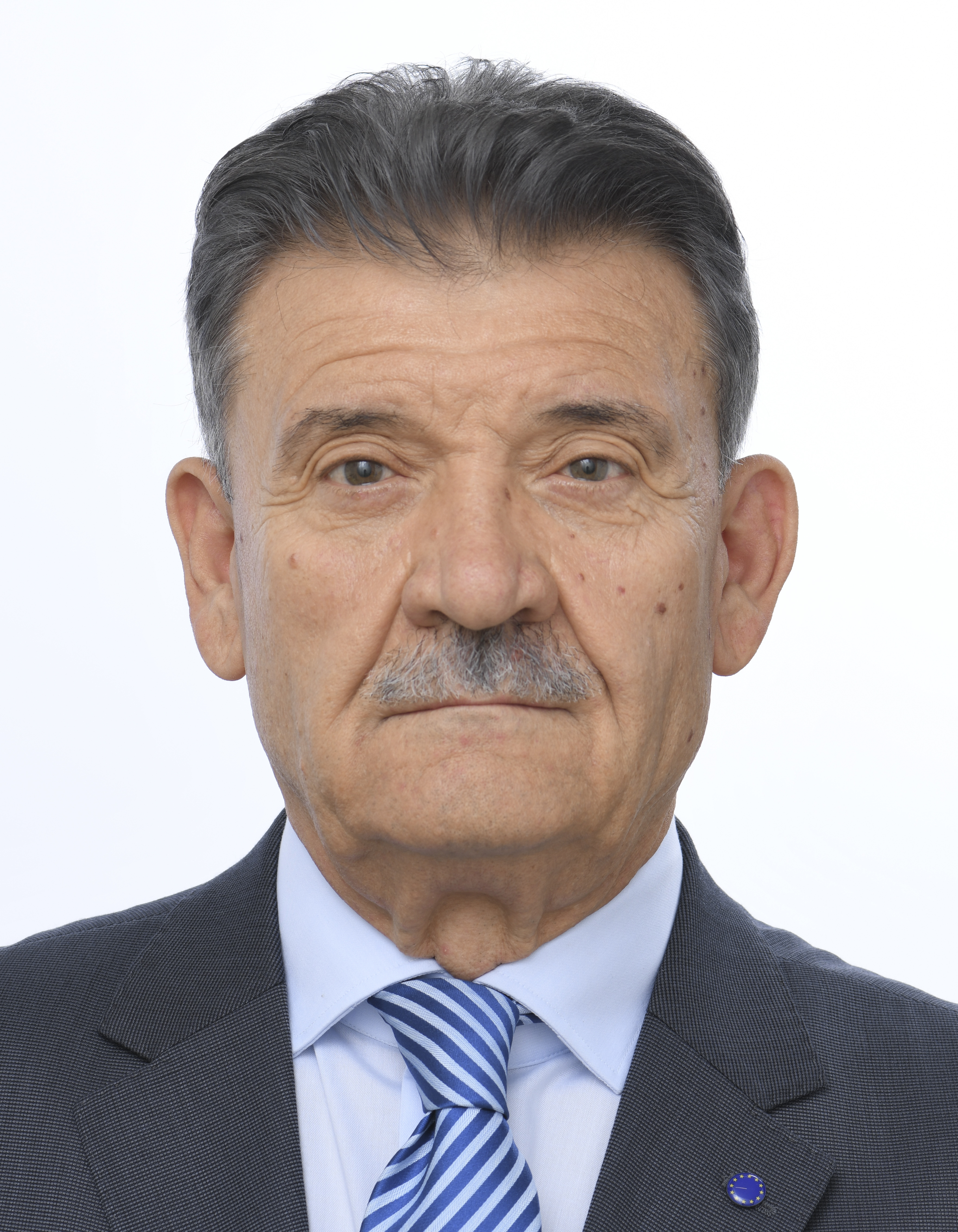
Official portrait, 2024

Mircea Hava MEP (born 26 December 1956) is a Romanian politician, engineer, and member of the European Parliament. Hava was elected as member of the European Parliament on the list of the National Liberal Party (PNL) at the 2019 European Parliament election in Romania.

Hava was also mayor of Alba Iulia for 25 years, firstly between 1991 and 1992 and then once more from 1996 to 2019. He was also a member of the Democratic Party (PD) before joining the National Liberal Party (PNL).

In 2004, he was reelected with more than 70% of the votes.

== Orders and decorations ==
- Officer National Order of Merit – 2011
- Knight National Order of Merit – 2004
