= Romania (European Parliament constituency) =

Constituency of the European Parliament

- European Parliament constituency
- Location among the current constituencies
- Member state: Romania
- Created: 2007
- MEPs: 35 (2007–2009); 33 (2009–2014); 32 (2014–present)

Romania is a European Parliament constituency for elections in the European Union covering the member state of Romania. It is currently represented by thirty-three Members of the European Parliament.

== Elections ==
=== 2007 ===
The 2007 European election was Romania's first election since joining the European Union (EU) which occurred during the same year.

=== 2009 ===
The 2009 European election was the seventh election to the European Parliament and the second for Romania.

=== 2014 ===
The 2014 European election was the eighth election to the European Parliament and the third for Romania.

=== 2019 ===
The 2019 European election was the ninth election to the European Parliament and the fourth for Romania.

=== 2024 ===
The 2024 European election was the tenth election to the European Parliament and the fifth for Romania.
