= 2019 European Parliament election in Romania =

- 26 May 2019

All 32 Romanian seats in the European Parliament (33 after Brexit)
- Turnout: 51.15%
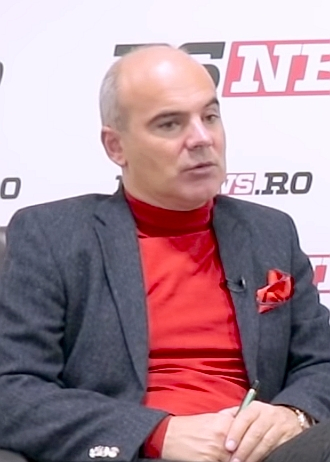

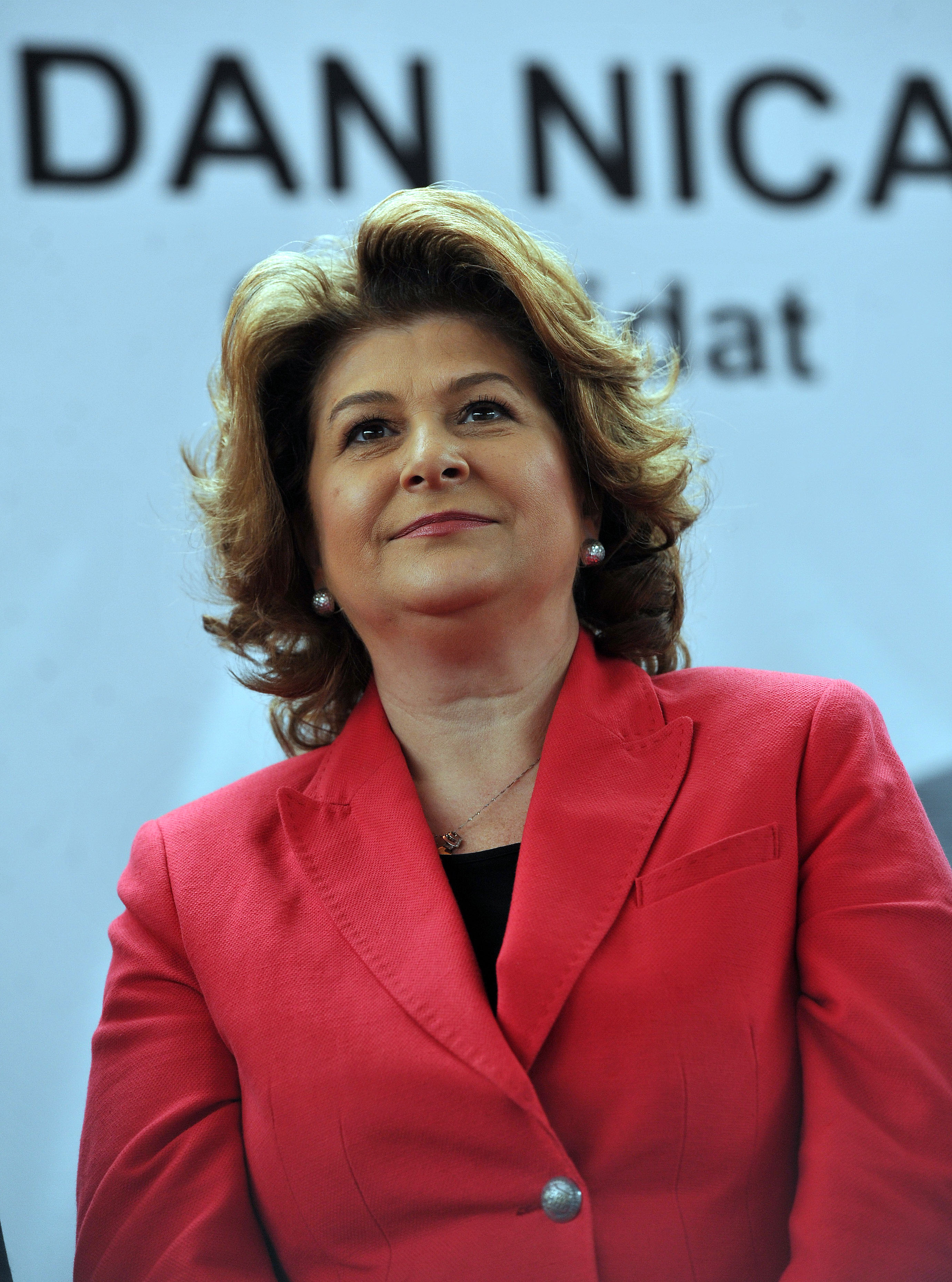

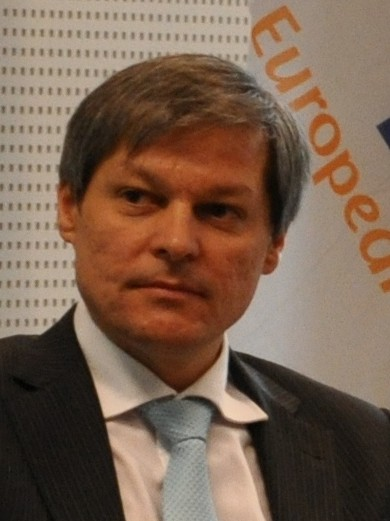

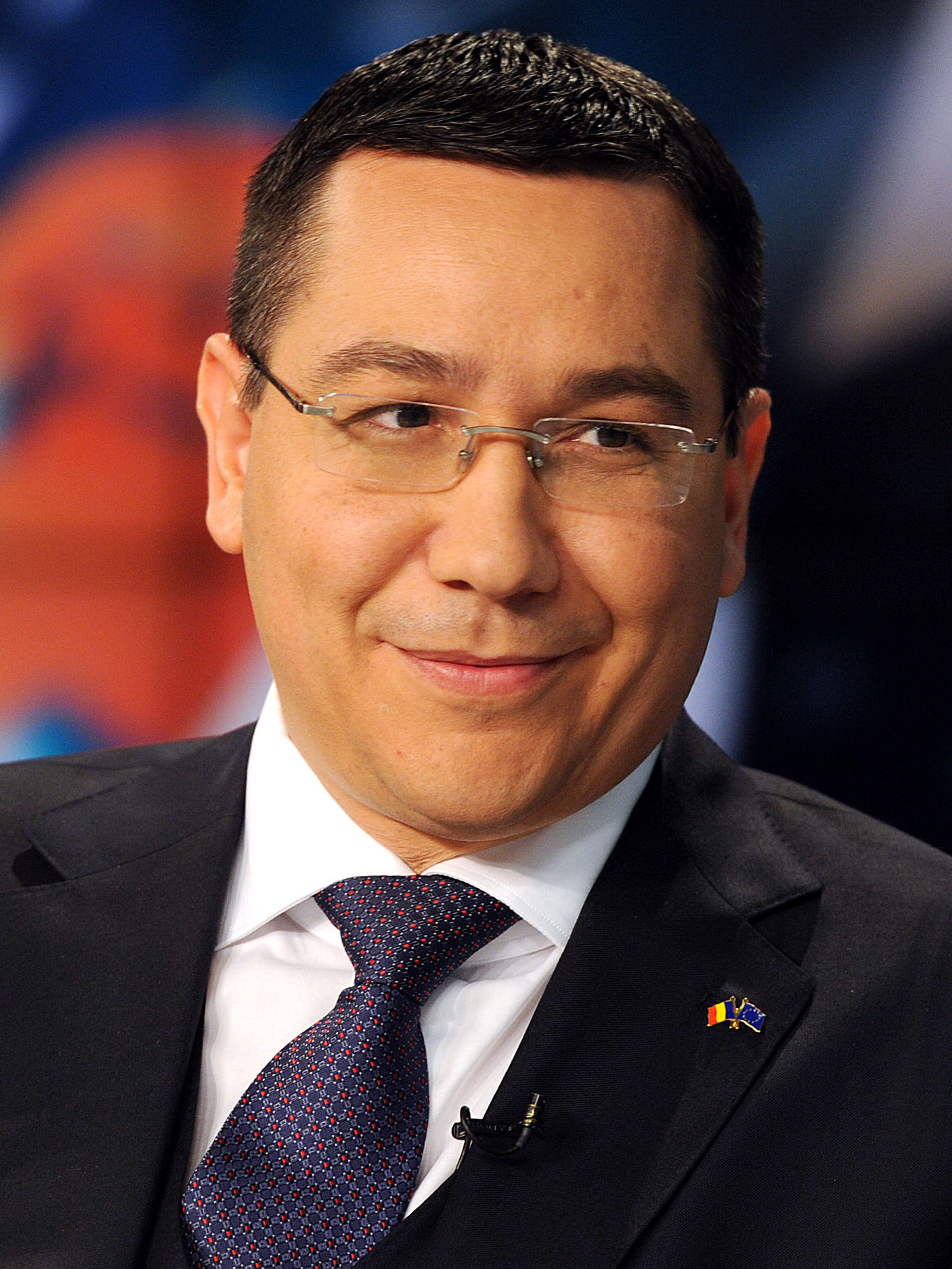

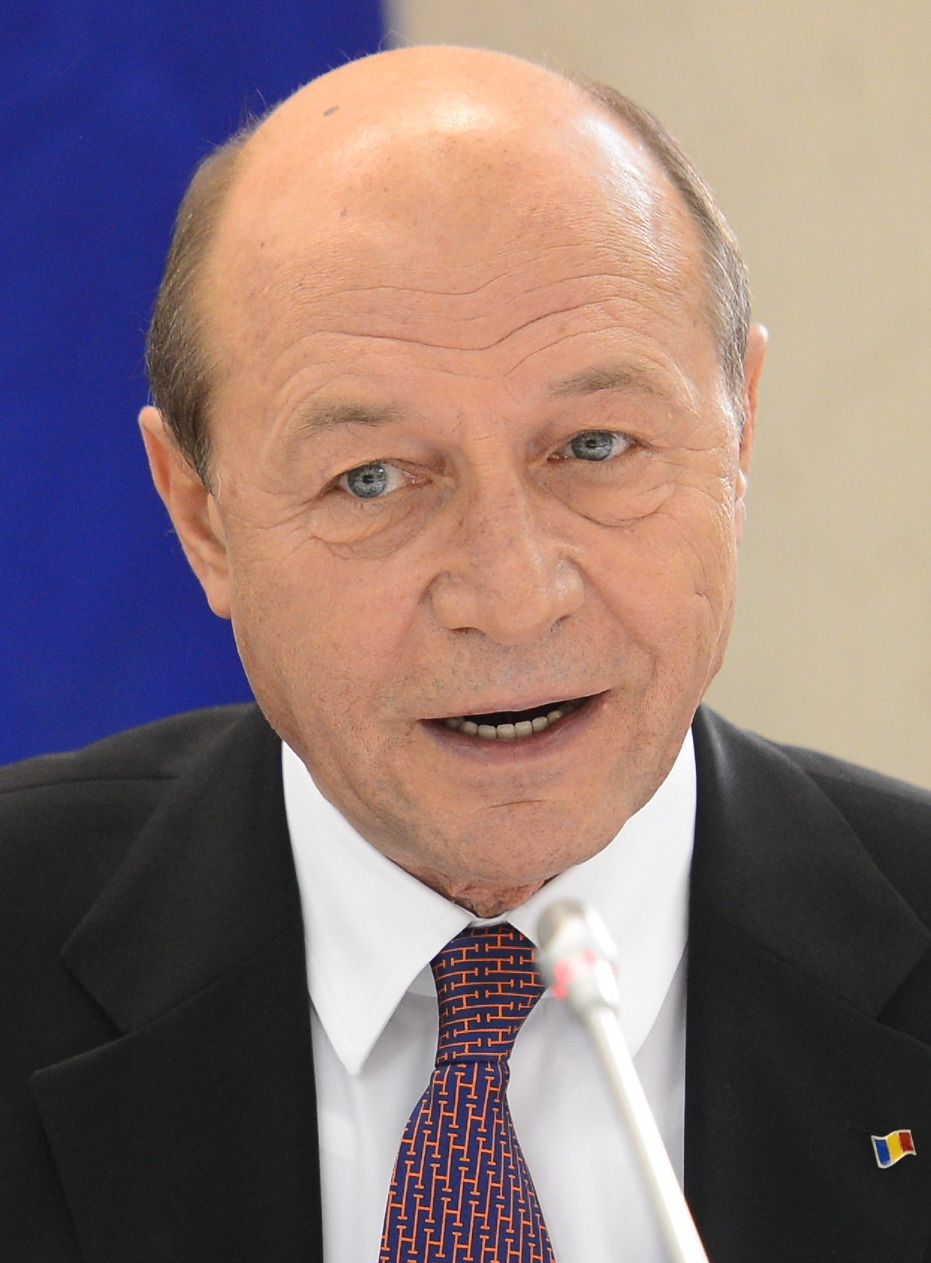

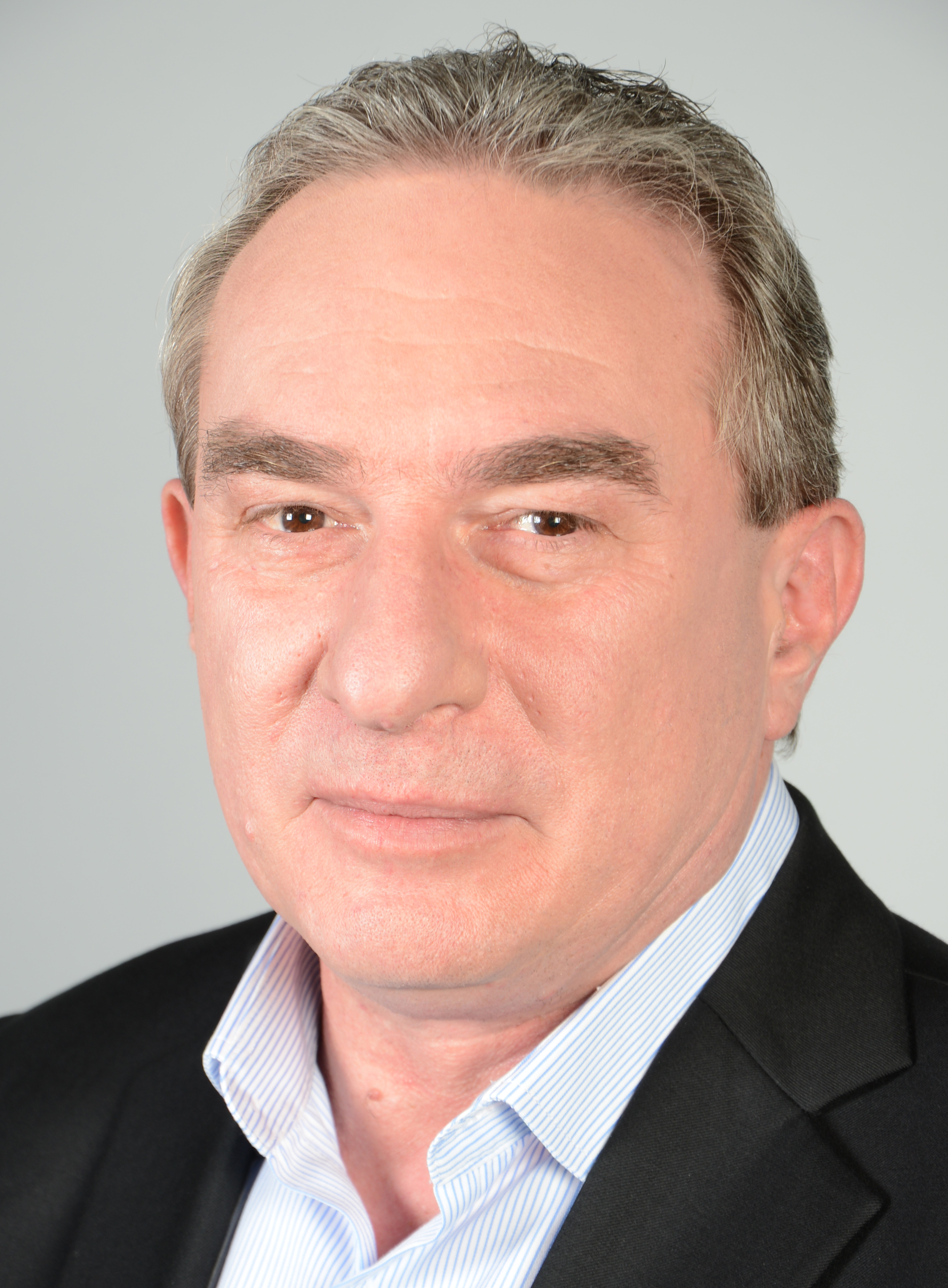
	First party	Second party	Third party
Leader	Rareș Bogdan	Rovana Plumb	Dacian Cioloș
Party	PNL	PSD	USR PLUS
Alliance	EPP	S&D	RE
Last election	11 seats	12 seats	–
Seats won	10	9	8
Seat change	▼1	▼3	New
Popular vote	2,449,068	2,040,765	2,028,236
Percentage	27.00%	22.50%	22.36%
	Fourth party	Fifth party	Sixth party
Leader	Victor Ponta	Traian Băsescu	Iuliu Winkler
Party	PRO Romania	PMP	UDMR
Alliance	S&D	EPP	EPP
Last election	–	2 seats	2 seats
Seats won	2	2	2
Seat change	New	Steady	Steady
Popular vote	583,916	522,104	476,777
Percentage	6.44%	5.76%	5.26%
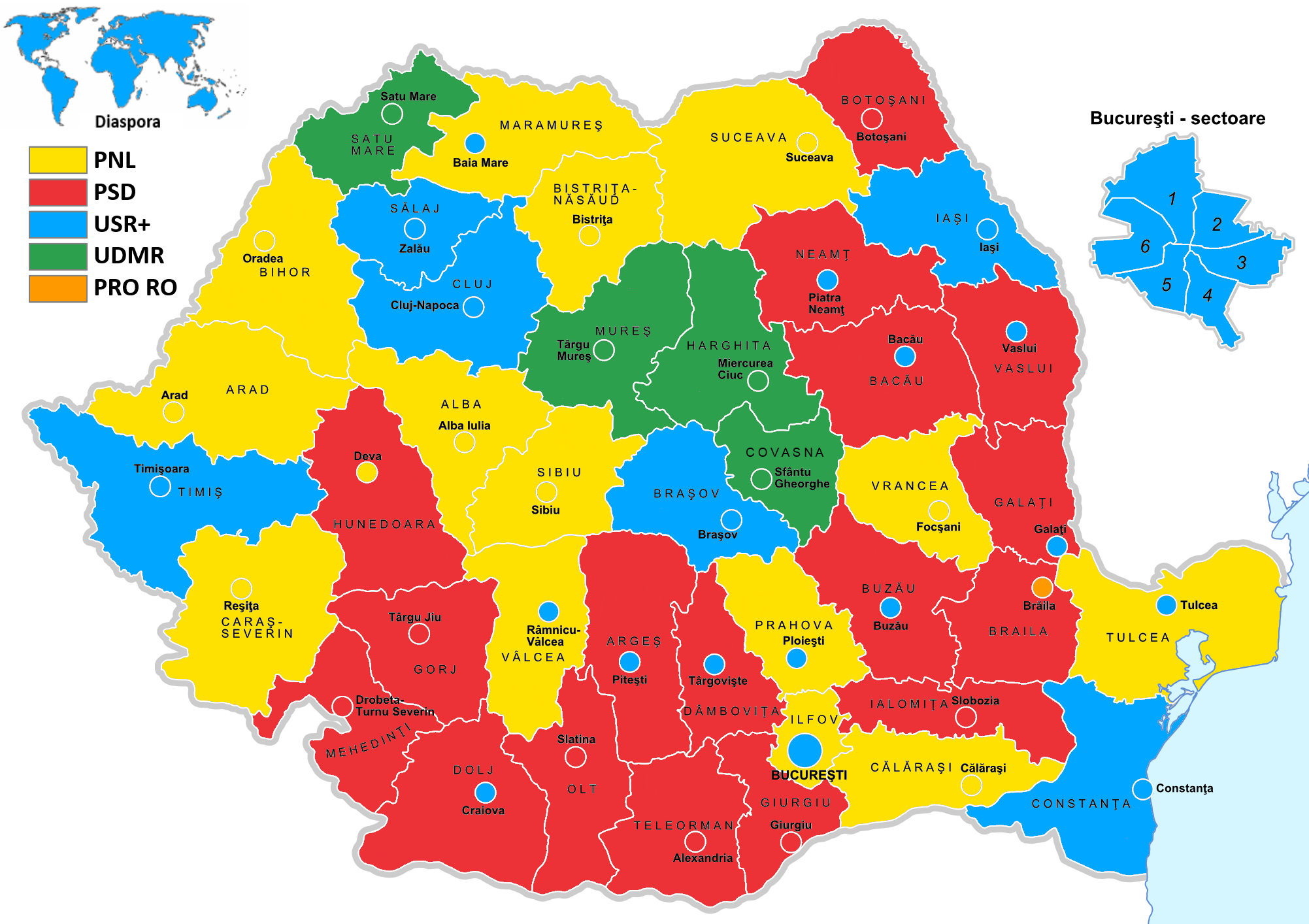
- Winning party by county

European Parliament elections were held in Romania on 26 May 2019.

== Background ==
=== Social Democratic Party (PSD) ===
In April 2019, the Party of European Socialists (PES) announced on Wednesday that it would freeze relations with the Social Democrats (PSD) at least until June, citing concerns about the rule of law in the country. Since then the (PSD) moved further to Euroscepticism. Victor Ponta, who was expelled from the PSD in 2017, said "The PSD unfortunately has turned to a very populist, very nationalistic, demagogic party," he said.

=== National Liberal Party (PNL) ===
Three days after the 2014 election, on 28 May 2014, National Liberal Party president Crin Antonescu announced that the party would change European affiliation from ALDE to EPP, and it has started negotiations for the merger with the Democratic Liberal Party. The newly created party would still be called National Liberal Party, and be a member of the EPP. Democratic Liberal Party president Vasile Blaga later that day confirmed the merger of the two parties. MEP Norica Nicolai, first candidate on the National Liberal Party list refused to join the European People's Party group, and continued to stay a member of the Alliance of Liberals and Democrats for Europe group. After the 2014 presidential election, MEP Renate Weber, second candidate on the National Liberal Party list, resigned the European People's Party group, and joined the Alliance of Liberals and Democrats for Europe group. After the completion of the merger of the two parties, the two MEPs were given an ultimatum to join the European People's Party group or face party exclusion. They failed to fulfill the request and thus were expelled from the National Liberal Party, and currently stand with the Alliance of Liberals and Democrats for Europe group. Later, MEP Norica Nicolai joined the Alliance of Liberals and Democrats.

In late August 2017, MEP Ramona Mănescu, third candidate on the National Liberal Party list, resigned the party, but continued to stand with the European People's Party group.

In May 2018, People's Movement Party MEP Siegfried Mureșan, spokesman of the European People's Party, announced he is leaving the party to join the National Liberal Party.

Journalist Rareș Bogdan, formerly a staunch opponent to the liberals, was officially nominated as head of the PNL list for the European Parliament elections, which also contains, among others, former co-president of PNL Vasile Blaga, MEPs Siegfried Mureșan, Adina Vălean, Daniel Buda, Cristian Bușoi, Marian-Jean Marinescu and Mihai Țurcanu, and mayors Mircea Hava and Gheorghe Falcă.

=== Democratic Liberal Party (PDL) ===
Three days after the 2014 election, on 28 May 2014, Democratic Liberal Party president Vasile Blaga confirmed the announcement made by National Liberal Party president Crin Antonescu, that the two parties were to merge into a new party, that would retain the name of the latter and international affiliation of the former. To express discontent with this decision, and the lack of a PDL candidate to the presidential election, MEP Monica Macovei, second candidate on the Democratic Liberal Party list resigned the party in September 2014, and competed in the 2014 presidential election as an independent. Following the presidential election, she joined, as an independent politician, the European Conservatives and Reformists.

=== People's Movement Party (PMP) ===
In September 2014, following some declarations, Cristian Preda, first candidate on the People's Movement Party list, was expelled from the party. He continued to stand in the European People's Party group.

In 2016, the People's Movement Party merged with (absorbed) the National Union for the Progress of Romania, but the later's MEPs did not join the People's Movement Party.

In May 2018, MEP Siegfried Mureșan, spokesman of the European People's Party, announced he is leaving the People's Movement Party, to join the National Liberal Party. As a result, the People's Movement Party lost both its MEPs.

=== Conservative Party (PC) ===
The Conservative Party ran with the National Union for the Progress of Romania on a common list headed by the Social Democratic Party at the previous election. This electoral alliance was supposed to be called "Social Democratic Union" ("Uniunea Social Democrată"), but, due to the Romanian legislation (this name was taken by a 1990s alliance between the Democratic Party and Romanian Social Democratic Party), they ran as "PSD-UNPR-PC". In 2015, the party merged with the Liberal Reformist Party, to form the Alliance of Liberals and Democrats Members displeased with this decision, headed by MEP Maria Grapini (first Conservative Party candidate, and fifth on the PSD-UNPR-PC list), founded a new party, Humanist Power Party (Social-Liberal) (Romanian: Partidul Puterii Umaniste (Social-Liberal)). She continues to stand with the Progressive Alliance of Socialists and Democrats, as a member of PPU-SL. Laurențiu Rebega, second Conservative Party candidate and fourteenth on the PSD-UNPR-PC list, sat as an independent politician in the Non-Inscrits group, before joining PRO Romania and the ECR.

=== National Union for the Progress of Romania (UNPR) ===
The National Union for the Progress of Romania ran with the Conservative Party on a common list headed by the Social Democratic Party at the previous election. This electoral alliance was supposed to be called "Social Democratic Union" ("Uniunea Social Democrată"), but, due to the Romanian legislation (this name was taken by a 1990s alliance between the Democratic Party and Romanian Social Democratic Party), they ran as "PSD-UNPR-PC". In 2016, the National Union for the Progress of Romania merged with (was absorbed by) the People's Movement Party, but the former's MEPs did not join the People's Movement Party. Both its two candidates continue to stand with the Progressive Alliance of Socialists and Democrats: Damian Drăghici (first National Union for the Progress of Romania candidate and sixth on the "PSD-UNPR-PC" list) as an independent member, and Doru Frunzulică (second National Union for the Progress of Romania candidate and thirteenth on the "PSD-UNPR-PC" list) joined the Social Democratic Party.

== Opinion polls ==
Date	Polling Firm	PSD S&D	ALDE	PRO EDP	USR ALDE	PLUS -	UDMR EPP	PNL EPP	PMP EPP	Others	Lead
2–20 May 2019	IMAS	21.1%	9.8%	9.9%	19.6%		3.8%	28.5%	6.2%	1.1%	7.4%
14–19 May 2019	Novel Research	27.8%	7.9%	7.6%	14.8%		5%	28.1%	6.7%	2.1%	0.3%
1–7 May 2019	BCS	31.5%	6.6%	7.8%	14.5%		5.1%	26.1%	6.1%	2.3%	5.4%
12 April–3 May 2019	INSCOP	25.5%	9.2%	9.1%	16.5%		4.8%	27.6%	3.9%	3.4%	2.1%
April 2019	PNL	25%	—N/a	—N/a	—N/a	—N/a	—N/a	27%	—N/a	16%	2%
April 2019	D&D Research	29.3%	6.7%	4.6%	22.3%		2.7%	29.9%	3.7%	0.9%	0.9%
5–28 April 2019	CURS	32%	10%	9%	12%		5%	25%	5%	2%	7%
12–25 April 2019	IMAS	21.7%	12.2%	11.7%	16.4%		5.6%	25.6%	5.6%	1.1%	3.9%
18 March–3 April 2019	IMAS	21.2%	12.7%	11.2%	17.7%		5.1%	25.2%	4.7%	1.9%	4.0%
15–20 March 2019	BCS	26.5%	8.1%	10.2%	10.8%		4.4%	29.8%	6.2%	4%	3.3%
15–20 March 2019	BCS	25.8%	7.9%	6.7%	11.7%		4.6%	31.5%	5.9%	3.1%	5.7%
5–13 March 2019	INSCOP	26.9%	9.3%	9.1%	15.3%		5%	26.3%	4.4%	3.7%	0.6%
February–March 2019	PNL	24.6%	11.8%	6.7%	16%		—N/a	27.9%	—N/a	13%	3.3%
13–28 February 2019	CURS	31%	12%	10%	13%		5%	23%	5%	1%	8%
1–21 February 2019	IMAS	22.7%	12.5%	13.4%	17.9%		4.7%	22.6%	4.4%	1.8%	0.1%
21 January–6 February 2019	CURS	32%	9%	9%	8%	5%	5%	22%	5%	5%	10%
21 January–5 February 2019	INSCOP	27.8%	9.2%	6.6%	10.0%	7.0%	5.1%	26.7%	4.4%	3.2%	1.1%
11–30 January 2019	IMAS	24.6%	12.9%	9.0%	13.1%	7.3%	5.6%	23.3%	2.5%	1.6%	1.3%
12–20 January 2019	BCS	23.0%	8.1%	10.7%	6.5%	8.1%	4.8%	23.7%	9.3%	5.8%	0.7%
December 2018	PNL	30.2%	11.5%	5.5%	10.2%	5%	5.1%	27.8%	4.2%	0.7%	2.4%
24 November–9 December 2018	CURS	33%	9%	9%	7%	5%	6%	20%	5%	6%	13%
26 October–12 November 2018	CURS	38%	15%	9%	8%	7%	—N/a	15%	3%	5%	23%
25 May 2014	Election results	37.6%^{[a]}	–	–	–	–	6.3%	29.8%^{[c]}	6.2%	20.0%	22.6%

== Candidates and Elected MEPs ==
The Central Electoral Bureau publishes the lists the latest in 24 hours after they have been registered by the parties.

=== National Liberal Party (PNL) ===
1. Rareș Bogdan
2. Mircea Hava
3. Siegfried Mureșan
4. Vasile Blaga
5. Adina Vălean
6. Daniel Buda
7. Dan Motreanu
8. Gheorghe Falcă
9. Cristian Bușoi
10. Marian Jean Marinescu
11. Vlad Nistor
12. Mihai Țurcanu
13. Violeta Alexandru
14. Ligia Popescu
15. Ana Dimitriu
16. Mădălin Teodosescu
17. Alexandru Epure
18. Ciprian Ciucu
19. Aleodor Frâncu
20. Claudia Benchescu
21. Adrian Dupu
22. Dragoș Soare
23. Ionel Palăr
24. Tudor Polak
25. Emanuel Soare
26. Marius Minea
27. Alexandru Șerban
28. Claudiu Chira
29. Alexandru Salup-Rusu
30. Ilie Cotinescu
31. Cosmina Neamțu
32. Alexandru Părduț
33. Costel Stanca
34. Gheorghe Firon
35. Cristina Chivu
36. Sorina Marin
37. Daniel Grosu
38. Alexandru Țoncu
39. Viorica Mihai
40. Adrian Dabarac
41. Larissa Bîrsan
42. Ioan Chirteș
43. Ion Vela

=== Social Democratic Party (PSD) ===
1. Rovana Plumb
2. Carmen Avram
3. Claudiu Manda
4. Cristian Terheș
5. Dan Nica
6. Maria Grapini
7. Tudor Ciuhodaru
8. Dragos Benea
9. Victor Negrescu
10. Andi Cristea
11. Natalia Intotero
12. Gabriela Zoană
13. Bianca Gavriliţă
14. Emilian Pavel
15. Doina Pană
16. Crina-Fiorela Chilat
17. Mariana Bălănică
18. Răzvan Popa
19. Luminița Jivan
20. Alin Pavelescu
21. Augustin Ioan
22. Cătălin Grigore
23. Roxana Pațurcă
24. Oana Florea
25. Dragoș Cristian
26. Mihai Ion Macaveiu
27. Liviu Brăiloiu
28. Florin Manole
29. Ion Voinea
30. Horia Grama
31. Alexandru Popa
32. Aida Căruceru
33. Gheorghe Tomoioagă
34. Anca Daniela Raiciu
35. Mitică Marius Mărgărit
36. Nasi Calențaru
37. Cristina Tăteață
38. Petru Moț
39. Luminița Țundrea
40. Emanuel Iacob
41. Cătălin Unciuleanu
42. Gabriel Bogdan Răducan
43. Andrei Sima

=== 2020 USR-PLUS Alliance (USR PLUS) ===
1. Dacian Cioloș (PLUS)
2. Cristian Ghinea (USR)
3. Dragos Nicolae Pîslaru (PLUS)
4. Clotilde Armand (USR)
5. Ioan Dragoș Tudorache (PLUS)
6. Nicolae Ștefănuță (USR)
7. Vlad Botoș (USR)
8. Ramona Victoria Strugariu (PLUS)
9. Vlad Gheorghe (USR)
10. Alin Cristian Mituța (PLUS)
11. Naomi Reniuț Ursoiu (USR)
12. Oana Țoiu (PLUS)
13. Radu Ghelmez (USR)
14. Liviu Iolu (PLUS)
15. Radu Mihaiu (USR)
16. Iulian Lorincz (USR)
17. Adriana Cristian (USR)
18. Camelia Crișan (USR)
19. Anca Majaru (PLUS)
20. George Țăranu (USR)
21. Bogdan Deleanu (PLUS)
22. Ștefan Pălărie (PLUS)
23. Silviu Gurlui (USR)
24. Alexandru Grigorescu Negri (PLUS)
25. Teodora Stoian (USR)
26. George Gima (PLUS)
27. Alexandru Vărzaru (USR)
28. Raluca Amariei (USR)
29. Anca Radu (PLUS)
30. Miroslav Tașcu Stavre (USR)
31. Gabriela Maria Mirescu Gruber (PLUS)
32. Florin Andrei (USR)
33. Cătălina-Teodora Sofron (PLUS)
34. Sorin Dan Clinci (PLUS)
35. Emanuel Stoica (USR)
36. Iulian Crăciun (PLUS)
37. Octavian Berceanu (USR)
38. Daniela Șerban (PLUS)
39. Cristina Iurișniți (USR)
40. Elena Uram (USR)

=== PRO Romania (PRO) ===
1. Victor Ponta
2. Corina Crețu
3. Mihai Tudose
4. Iurie Leancă
5. Geanina Puşcaşu
6. Gabriela Podască
7. Cristian Cosmin
8. Ioana Petrescu
9. Mihai Sturzu
10. Ionela Danciu

=== Democratic Alliance of Hungarians in Romania (UDMR/RMDSZ) ===
1. Iuliu Winkler
2. Loránt Vincze
3. Csilla Hegedüs
4. Csongor Oltean
5. Csaba Sógor
6. Irénke Kovács
7. Attila Cseke
8. Erika Benkő
9. Csaba Pataki
10. Zsombor Ambrus
11. Ildikó Szőcs
12. Péter Faragó
13. Izabella Ambrus
14. Mária Búzás-Fekete
15. Attila-Zoltán Csibi
16. Márta Máté
17. Gábor Kereskényi
18. Dalma Pető
19. Róbert István Szilágyi
20. Ildikó Tripon
21. Atilla Lehel Décsei
22. Anna Bogya
23. István-Balázs Birtalan
24. Vilmos Meleg
25. Ida Marina
26. Hunor Jenő András
27. László Derzsi
28. Imelda Tóásó
29. Károly Kolcsár
30. Béla Bors
31. Emőke Kerekes
32. Botond Balázs
33. Róbert Kiss
34. Hunor Mákszem
35. Éva Hudácsek
36. Lajos Papp
37. Orsolya Béres
38. Gábor Imre
39. Tímea Orbán
40. Géza Antal
41. Mária Gorbai
42. Levente Erős
43. Hunor Kelemen

=== People's Movement Party (PMP) ===
1. Traian Băsescu
2. Eugen Tomac
3. Ioana Constantin
4. Marius Paşcan
5. Simona Vlădica
6. Robert Turcescu
7. Teodora Desagă
8. Petru Movilă
9. Cătălina Bozianu
10. Cătălin Bulf

=== Parties and candidates that did not pass the threshold ===
1. Alliance of Liberals and Democrats (ALDE)
2. Peter Costea (independent candidate)
3. George Simion (independent candidate)
4. Gregoriana Carmen Tudoran (independent candidate)
5. National Union for the Progress of Romania (UNPR)
6. Prodemo Party
7. United Romania Party (PRO)
8. Romanian Socialist Party
9. Independent Social Democratic Party
10. National Unity Block - NUB

=== Rejected candidates and lists ===
1. Octavian-Iulian Tiron
2. Freemen's Party
3. Ana Daniela Dobre
4. Party of Democracy and Solidarity - Demos
5. Pensioners' Force Party
6. Communitarian Party of Romania
7. Greater Romania Party
8. Gabriela-Ștefania Nuț
9. Ilie Rotaru
10. Sevastița Dumitrache
11. Luminița Velciu
12. Alexandra Ana Maria Gafița (Prodemo Party)
13. Romanian Nationhood Party
14. Our Romania Party
15. New Romania Party
16. Liberal Right
17. The Right Alternative

== Results ==
Party	Votes	%	Seats	+/–
National Liberal Party	2,449,068	27.00	10	–1
Social Democratic Party	2,040,765	22.50	9	–3
2020 USR-PLUS Alliance	2,028,236	22.36	8	New
PRO Romania	583,916	6.44	2	New
People's Movement Party	522,104	5.76	2	0
Democratic Alliance of Hungarians in Romania	476,777	5.26	2	0
Alliance of Liberals and Democrats	372,760	4.11	0	–2
National Union for the Progress of Romania	54,942	0.61	0	–2
Prodemo Party	53,351	0.59	0	New
United Romania Party	51,787	0.57	0	New
Romanian Socialist Party	40,435	0.45	0	0
Independent Social Democratic Party	26,439	0.29	0	New
National Unity Block	20,411	0.23	0	New
Independents	348,831	3.85	0	–1
Total	9,069,822	100.00	33	+1
Valid votes	9,069,822	97.06		
Invalid/blank votes	274,415	2.94		
Total votes	9,344,237	100.00		
Registered voters/turnout	18,267,256	51.15		
Source: BEC

=== MEP's gender balance ===
Romania's constitutive session for the year 2019 was represented by 29% women and 71% men.

=== Gallery ===
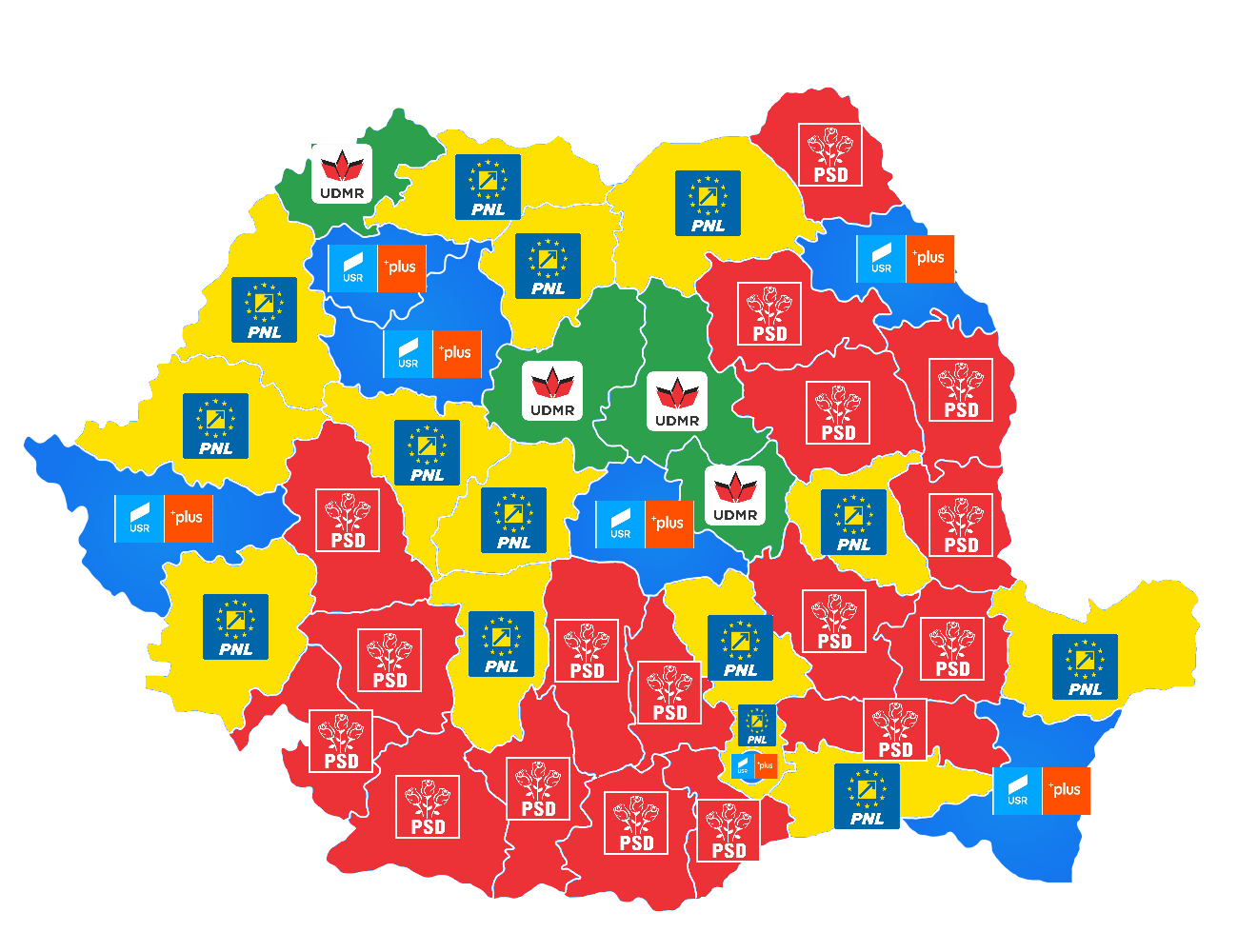
Electoral map of the counties by winning political party in the 2019 European Parliament election in Romania

== Notes ==
The Social Democratic Party (PSD) ran in 2014 as part of the a three-party alliance that also included the Conservative Party (PC, a founding member of the ALDE party in 2015) and the National Union for the Progress of Romania (UNPR). Initially, it intended to run as the "Social Democratic Union" (USD), but, as the same name was used by an alliance in the 1990s by the now longtime defunct Democratic Party (PD) and Romanian Social Democratic Party (PSDR), they ran as "PSD-UNPR-PC Alliance". Save Romania Union (USR) and Freedom, Unity and Solidarity Party (PLUS) ran together under the moniker 2020 USR-PLUS Alliance. Includes the Civic Force (FC) (2,6% in 2014), which merged into the Democratic Liberal Party (PDL) in July 2014, which itself subsequently merged into the PNL in November 2014.
