= Lia Olguța Vasilescu =

Romanian politician (born 1974)

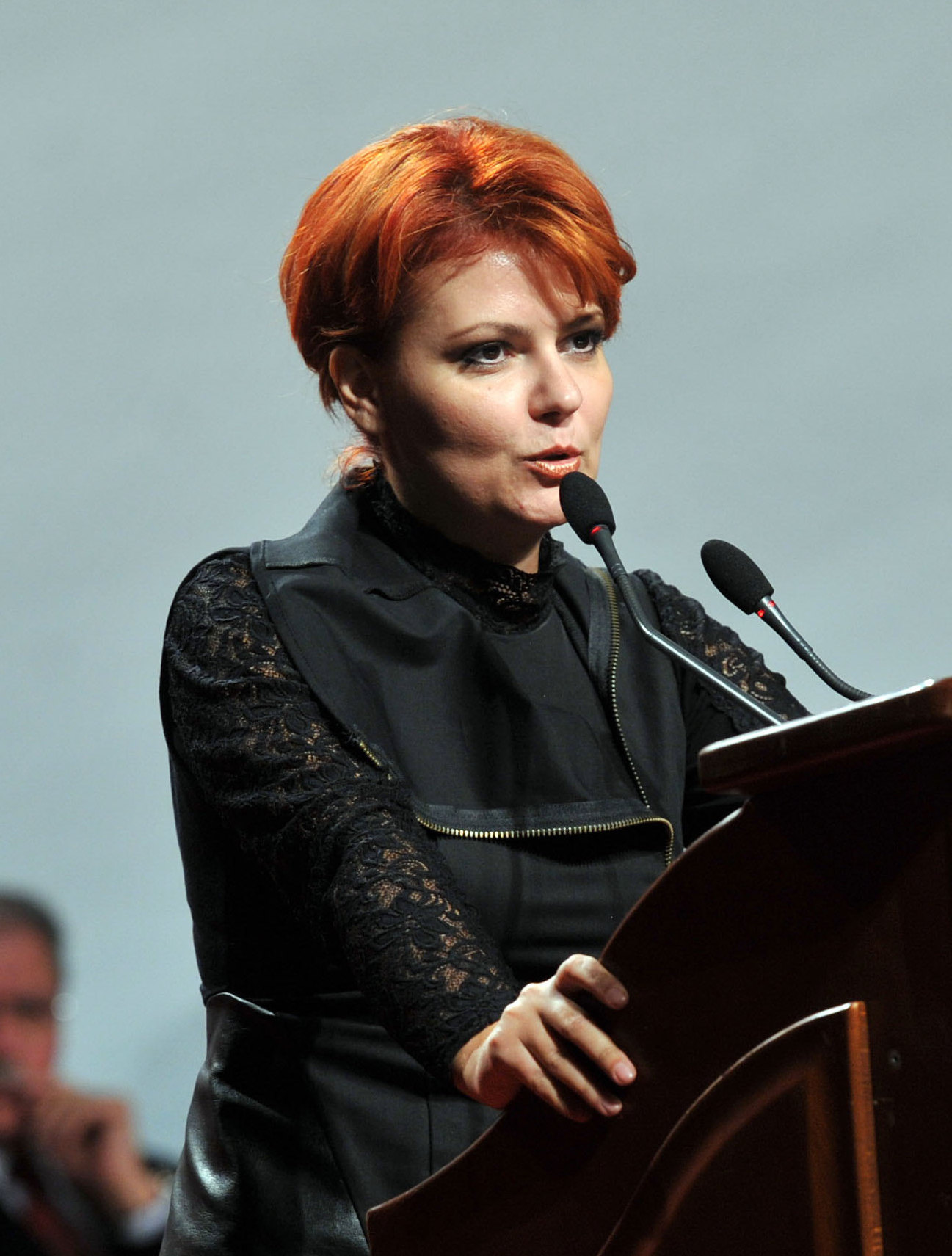

Mayor of Craiova
- Incumbent
- Assumed office 29 September 2020
- Preceded by: Mihail Genoiu
- In office 22 June 2012 – 5 January 2017
- Preceded by: Antonie Solomon
- Succeeded by: Mihail Genoiu

Minister of Labour
- In office 4 January 2017 – 20 November 2018
- Prime Minister: Sorin Grindeanu; Mihai Tudose; Viorica Dăncilă
- Preceded by: Dragoș Pîslaru
- Succeeded by: Marius Budăi

Personal details
- Born: 18 November 1974 (age 51) Craiova, Romania
- Party: Greater Romania Party (1991–2007); Social Democratic Party (2007–present)
- Education: University of Craiova
- Website: www.olgutavasilescu.ro

Lia Olguţa Vasilescu (born 18 November 1974) is a Romanian politician, member of the Social Democratic Party (PSD). She served as mayor of Craiova from 2012 to 2017, when she resigned to become Minister of Labor. She was reelected as Mayor of Craiova in 2020 and since then she has been serving as the mayor of Craiova.

== Personal life ==
Her ancestors left Cadrilater in 1940, after the Treaty of Craiova which transferred the region from Romania to Bulgaria. She is a graduate of the Elena Cuza National College in her native city. In 1997 she graduated the Faculty of Philology and History of the University of Craiova (Romanian-Italian language specialization).

Between 1997 and 2000, Vasilescu worked for the local newspaper Cuvântul Libertății from Craiova. She was an editor in the first year and became the Head of the Investigations Department in 1998. In 1999 she was promoted as Deputy Editor.

She wrote the books Cultura: factor de securitate națională (English: The Culture: factor of the national security) and Vilfredo Pareto și contribuția lui la dezvoltarea sociologiei moderne (English: Vilfredo Pareto and his contribution to the development of modern sociology).

Her former husband is the former Pro TV reporter Ovidiu Wlassopol and they have a child together.

Vasilescu has the black belt (2nd dan) in karate. She is the president of the Romanian subsidiary of WAKO PRO.

== Political activity ==
In 1991 she became a founding member of the Greater Romania Party. Vasilescu states that she became a nationalist after her scholarship in Italy. Three years later, Vasilescu was appointed as the Youth Organization of Greater Romania Party. She was the spokesperson of the same party between 2000 and 2004.

As a result of the Romanian general election from 26 November 2000 she became a member of the Chamber of Deputies, being at 26 years old the youngest elected person to hold this position until that time. She was re-elected as a member of the Chamber of Deputies at the 2004 Romanian general election, when she was the top candidate on the party-list of the Greater Romania Party for Dolj County.

In 2006 Vasilescu was invited by George Becali to become the national vice-president of New Generation Party, but she declined the offer.

In December 2007, while being the president of the Education Commission from the Chamber of Deputies, Vasilescu left the Greater Romania Party after being defamed in the newspaper Tricolorul, owned by Corneliu Vadim Tudor. She joined PSD, being convinced to make this move by its leader Mircea Geoană.

Between 2008 and 2012 she was a member of the Senate, being elected at the 2008 Romanian legislative election with 62.9% of the votes in the Cetate – Filiași single-member district (the highest score for a female MP), surpassing Eugen Georgescu (PDL) – 22.5% and Viorel Călin (PNL) - 9.4%.

In June 2012 she was elected the mayor of Craiova, becoming the first female acting as the mayor of a county capital in Romanian history. She gained 45.6% of the votes, surpassing Antonie Solomon who gained 40.1%.

In March 2013 she was elected as the President of the Craiova Organization of PSD. On 20 April 2013 she was elected one of the co-presidents of the Women's Organization of PSD (together with Ecaterina Andronescu, Corina Crețu, Gabriela Firea, and Rovana Plumb). In January 2017, she resigned as mayor of Craiova in order to take office as Minister of Labor in the cabinet of Sorin Grindeanu.
