= Opinion polling for the 2024 Romanian parliamentary election =

In preparation for the 2024 Romanian parliamentary election, which took on 1 December 2024, various polling companies and organisations from Romania have already (more specifically since December 2020 onwards) been carrying out a series of opinion polling to gauge and keep track of the voting intention among the overall electorate.

== Polls ==
=== 2024 ===
Date	Poll source	Sample size	PSD–PNL		United Right			AUR	UDMR	PRO	PUSL	AER		REPER	SOS	POT	Others	Lead
Date	Poll source	Sample size	PSD	PNL	USR	PMP	FD	AUR	UDMR	PRO	PUSL	PER	PV	REPER	SOS	POT	Others	Lead
1 December 2024	2024 Chamber election	—N/a	21.96	13.20	12.40	2.05		18.01	6.33	—N/a	—N/a	0.37	—N/a	1.24	7.36	6.46	10.62	3.95
1 December 2024	2024 Senate election	—N/a	22.30	14.28	12.26	1.88		18.30	6.38	—N/a	—N/a	0.42	—N/a	1.37	7.76	6.39	8.66	4.00
26–28 Nov 2024	AtlasIntel	2,116	21.4	13.4	17.5	2.5		22.4	5.5	—N/a	—N/a	—N/a	—N/a	1.5	4.6	4.6	6.6	1
9–13 Nov 2024	Newsweek	1,040	31	20	12	2		16	5	—N/a	—N/a	—N/a	—N/a	1	5	—N/a	2	18
7–12 Nov 2024	INSCOP	1,100	31.1	16.2	12.7	1.1		20.7	4.5	—N/a	—N/a	—N/a	1.2	2.6	5.9	—N/a	4	10.4
30 Oct–5 Nov 2024	CURS	1,067	32	20	12	3		15	5	—N/a	—N/a	—N/a	—N/a	—N/a	6	—N/a	7	12
24–28 Oct 2024	Newsweek	1,150	31	20.5	16.5	3.1		17.5	6.5	—N/a	—N/a	—N/a	—N/a	0.9	2.6	—N/a	1.2	10.5
11–18 Oct 2024	INSCOP	1,106	30.2	13.2	12.7	3.1		18	3	—N/a	—N/a	—N/a	—N/a	—N/a	7	—N/a	3	8.8
11–16 Oct 2024	CURS	1,006	31	20	15	1.4	0.6	21.4	3.7	—N/a	—N/a	2.1	—N/a	2.5	8.1	—N/a	4.1	11
7–9 Oct 2024	Verified for USR	1,009	28.2	12.6	19.5	1.0	1.7	22.7	4.2	0.7	0.2	0.5	—N/a	2.4	5.3	—N/a	1.0	8.7
11–16 Sep 2024	INSCOP	1,102	30.1	14.3	17.1	0.8	0.9	14.7	5.0	1.4	0.3	—N/a	0.7	1.9	8.9	—N/a	3.9	13
24–30 Aug 2024	The Center for International Research and Analyses	1,099	31.0	22.0	13.0	1.0	1.0	14.0	5.0	—N/a	—N/a	—N/a	—N/a	1.0	10.0	—N/a	2.0	9
Aug 2024	Verified for USR	—N/a	29.3	17.8	13.1	1.6	1.5	16.6	2.9	2.5	0.4	1.4	—N/a	2.5	8.7	—N/a	1.7	11.5
19–27 June 2024	INSCOP Research	1,100	29.4	18.9	12.2	—N/a	—N/a	14.7	4.6	1.1	1.5	2.2	1.9	3.6	6.1	—N/a	3.8	11.5
9 June 2024	2024 European election	—N/a	48.55		8.71			14.93	6.48	—N/a	1.48	—N/a	—N/a	3.74	5.03	—N/a	11.08 (Note: PDU: 1.79%; Patriots Party: 0.73%; PRM: 0.66%; AD: 0.45%; ARS: 0.42%)	33.62
9 June 2024	2024 Local Election	—N/a	32.52	26.13	11.54			9.61	5.42	0.34	1.47	0.68		0.80	1.39	—N/a	10.10	6.39
14 Feb–4 Mar 2024	INSCOP	2,000	32.8	19.7	10.6 (Note: In this scenario, USR, PMP and FD are running on the same list)			16.5	3.9	2.5	1	1.4		1	6.2	—N/a	4.4 (Note: BSR: 0.5%)	13.1
19–20 Feb 2024	Avangarde	NA	31	20	15 (Note: In this scenario, USR, PMP and FD are running on the same list)			18	5	—N/a	—N/a	—N/a	—N/a	2	8	—N/a	1	11
3–8 Jan 2024	Snap Market Research	998	32	12	10 (Note: In this scenario, USR, PMP and FD are running on the same list)			13	6	1	1	—N/a	—N/a	1	8		16 (Note: UNPR: 4%; BSR: 9%)	19
6 December 2020	2020 Chamber election	—N/a	28.90	25.18	15.37	4.82	—N/a	9.08	5.74	4.09	1.19	1.12	0.35	—N/a			6.82	3.72
6 December 2020	2020 Senate election	—N/a	29.32	25.58	15.86	4.93	—N/a	9.17	5.89	4.13	1.01	1.33	0.40	—N/a			5.12	3.74

=== 2023 ===
Date	Poll source	Sample size	PSD	PNL	USR	AUR	UDMR	PMP	PRO (Note: Also included ALDE in its overall political score in the 2020 parliamentary elections.)	PUSL	PER	PV	REPER	FD	S.O.S.	RSB	Others	Lead
16–28 Dec 2023	ARA Public Opinion	1.002	30.6	16.2	14.6	9.6	5.0	3.5	1.0	4.0	2.7	—N/a	—N/a	2.8	2.4		7.5	14.4
25–30 Nov 2023	Snap Market Research	983	29	13	8	16	6	5	2	1	—N/a	—N/a	1	1	5	8	5 (Note: National Union for the Progress of Romania: 3%)	13
20–27 Nov 2023	INSCOP	1.100	30.2	20.1	11.9	19.5	4.9	1.3	2.0	0.7	—N/a	1.9	0.3	0.6	5.2		1.3	10.1
30 Oct–6 Nov 2023	Mercury Research	1,227	29	17	15	20	4	3	—N/a	0	—N/a	—N/a	1	2	4		4	9
23 Oct–2 Nov 2023	INSCOP	1,100	29.5	18.4	14.1	20.2	3.8	1.7	2.6	—N/a	—N/a	2.6	0.5	1.0	4.3		1.4	9.3
20–29 Oct 2023	AtlasIntel	2,000	21.4	12.9	17.7	16.0	6.0	8.2	1.2	0.2	—N/a	—N/a	3.9	4.6	6.8		1.0 (Note: PNȚ-CD 0.4%)	3.7
11–25 Sep 2023	LARICS	1,003	32.0	23.9	14.7	14.3	2.9	4.0	—N/a	0.9	—N/a	—N/a	—N/a	—N/a	4.7		7.3	8.1
15–22 Sep 2023	INSCOP	1,550	29.1	20.4	11	22.4	4.6	1.7	1.5	—N/a	—N/a	2.5	0.7	1	3.1		4.9	6.7
12–22 Sep 2023	CURS	1,008	31	19	11	18	4	4	2	4	—N/a	—N/a	—N/a	—N/a	5		7	12
8–19 Sep 2023	Sociopol	1,004	29	15	15	23	5	3	—N/a	—N/a	3	—N/a	—N/a	—N/a	3		4	6
4–10 Sep 2023	PNL	1,032	30	20	14	20	5	4	1	—N/a	—N/a	—N/a	—N/a	1	3		5	10
24–31 Aug 2023	CURS	1,067	32	19	12	19	5	4	—N/a	2	—N/a	—N/a	—N/a	—N/a	4		3	13
8–20 July 2023	CURS	—N/a	31	18	12	20	4	4	2	4	—N/a	—N/a	—N/a	—N/a	4		5	11
June 2023	INSCOP	—N/a	28.7	18.0	12.7	20.1	—N/a	—N/a	—N/a	—N/a	—N/a	—N/a	—N/a	—N/a	—N/a		20.5	8.6
May–June 2023	Geeks for Democracy	806	31.0	19.0	11.0	18.0	5.0	—N/a	—N/a	—N/a	—N/a	—N/a	—N/a	—N/a	—N/a		16.0	12.0
27 May–11 June 2023	The Center	—N/a	28.0	18.0	13.0	22.0	6.0	3.0	2.0	—N/a	—N/a	—N/a	—N/a	2.0	—N/a		6.0	6.0
19–27 May 2023	CURS	1,082	31.0	20.0	11.0	17.0	5.0	5.0	—N/a	4.0	—N/a	—N/a	—N/a	—N/a	—N/a		7.0	12.0
12–17 May 2023	CURS	1,067	32.0	20.0	10.0	17.0	5.0	5.0	—N/a	3.0	—N/a	—N/a	—N/a	—N/a	—N/a		8.0	12.0
10–20 March 2023	CURS	1,105	33.0	21.0	9.0	16.0	5.0	5.0	—N/a	4.0	—N/a	—N/a	—N/a	—N/a	—N/a		7.0	12.0
5–19 Feb 2023	INSCOP	3,000	31.7	22.3	11.2	18.2	4.6	2.9	2.4	—N/a	—N/a	1.4	—N/a	—N/a	—N/a		5.4	9.4
1–13 Feb 2023	INSCOP	1,000	30.4	21.6	10.9	19.1	4.3	3.0	2.9	—N/a	1.6	2.7	0.1	0.7	—N/a		2.7	8.8
27–30 Jan 2023	Atlas Intel	2,000	24.8	17.2	12.4	17.9	6.4	5.9	4.0	—N/a	—N/a	—N/a	1.9	2.9	—N/a		2.8	6.9
10–20 Jan 2023	CURS	1,067	36.0	22.0	8.0	14.0	5.0	4.0	4.0	4.0	—N/a	—N/a	—N/a	—N/a	—N/a		3.0	14.0
6 December 2020	2020 Chamber election	—N/a	28.90	25.18	15.37	9.08	5.74	4.82	4.09	1.19	1.12	0.35	—N/a	—N/a			6.82	3.72
6 December 2020	2020 Senate election	—N/a	29.32	25.58	15.86	9.17	5.89	4.93	4.13	1.01	1.33	0.40	—N/a	—N/a			5.12	3.74

=== 2022 ===
Date	Poll source	Sample size	PSD	PNL	USR PLUS/USR	AUR	UDMR	PMP	PRO	ALDE (Note: ALDE is no longer active at any political level since late March 2022, having been entirely absorbed by the PNL in the meantime.)	PUSL	PER	ApP (Note: Formerly known as PAINE.)	REPER	FD	Others	Lead
Dec 2022	INSCOP	—N/a	31.5	20.2	10.9	18.1	—N/a	—N/a	—N/a	—N/a	—N/a	—N/a	—N/a	—N/a	—N/a	19.3	11.3
8–22 Nov 2022	CURS	1,067	34	24	9	12	5	4	—N/a	—N/a	4	—N/a	—N/a	—N/a	—N/a	8.0	10.0
Oct 2022	Sociopol	—N/a	36	19	11	14	4	2	2	1	0	3	0	4	1	3.0	17.0
8–22 Sep 2022	CURS	1,015	35	22	8	15	5	—N/a	4	—N/a	4	—N/a	—N/a	—N/a	—N/a	8.0	13.0
Aug 2022	Sociopol	—N/a	32	15	11	25	6	—N/a	—N/a	—N/a	—N/a	—N/a	—N/a	—N/a	—N/a	11.0	7.0
5–17 Aug 2022	CURS	—N/a	32	23	10	13	—N/a	4	2	—N/a	4	3	3	—N/a	2	2.0	9.0
22–31 Jul 2022	Avangarde	c. 900	37	23	9	11	5	4	1	—N/a	3	—N/a	2	1	2	2.0	14.0
22–30 Jun 2022	Avangarde	903	35	20	9	12	5	5	2	—N/a	4	—N/a	2	2	2	2.0	15.0
17–30 Jun 2022	IPSOS	1,072	37.8	25.4	12.7	10.1	3	3	4	—N/a	—N/a	—N/a	—N/a	—N/a	—N/a	4.0	12.4
19–26 May 2022	CURS	1,067	35	23	9	10	5	6	—N/a	—N/a	4	2	2	—N/a	—N/a	4.0	12.0
12–20 Apr 2022	Avangarde	906	36	19	11	14	5	—N/a	—N/a	—N/a	—N/a	—N/a	—N/a	—N/a	—N/a	16.0	17.0
28 Mar–11 Apr 2022	CURS	2,750	35	23	11	12	5	5	3	—N/a	2	—N/a	1	—N/a	1	2.0	12.0
22–29 Mar 2022	Avangarde	900	35	16	12	15	—N/a	—N/a	—N/a	—N/a	—N/a	—N/a	—N/a	—N/a	—N/a	22.0	19.0
2–11 Mar 2022	CURS	1,172	36	20	8	14	5	4	2	—N/a	4	2	2	—N/a	—N/a	3.0	16.0
2–7 Mar 2022	INSCOP	1,077	32	19.9	10.8	18.9	—N/a	—N/a	—N/a	—N/a	—N/a	—N/a	—N/a	—N/a	—N/a	18.4	13.6
9–19 Feb 2022	Sociopol	1,001	35	16	13	22	6	1	2	2	0	0	2	—N/a	1	0.0	18.0
20–31 Jan 2022	Avangarde	903	35	16	12	18	—N/a	—N/a	—N/a	—N/a	—N/a	—N/a	—N/a	—N/a	—N/a	19.0	17.0
22–29 Jan 2022	CURS	1,003	35	17	10	16	5	4	2	4	4	3	2	—N/a	3	2.0	18.0
10–18 Jan 2022	INSCOP	1,162	34.3	16.6	12.5	20.6	4.2	2.1	2.9	—N/a	1.3	—N/a	1.0	—N/a	1.7	1.5	13.7
6 December 2020	2020 Chamber election	—N/a	28.90	25.18	15.37	9.08	5.74	4.82	4.09		1.19	1.12	—N/a	—N/a	—N/a	6.82	3.72
6 December 2020	2020 Senate election	—N/a	29.32	25.58	15.86	9.17	5.89	4.93	4.13		1.01	1.33	—N/a	—N/a	—N/a	5.12	3.74

=== 2021 ===
Date	Poll source	Sample size	PSD	PNL	FD	USR PLUS	AUR	UDMR	PMP	PRO	ALDE	PUSL	PER	ApP	Others	Lead
15–23 Dec 2021	Avangarde	907	39.0	18.0	—N/a	10.0	17.0	5.0	3.0	2.0	—N/a	4.0	—N/a	1.0	1.0	21.0
17–22 Dec 2021	Sociopol	1,001	33.0	15.0	3.0	12.0	23.0	5.0	2.0	2.0	1.0	—N/a	1.0	1.0	2.0	10.0
13–17 Dec 2021	CURS	1,100	38.0	19.0	—N/a	11.0	13.0	5.0	5.0	—N/a	—N/a	4.0	—N/a	—N/a	5.0	19.0
25 Nov 2021	The Ciucă Cabinet, supported by a grand coalition consisting of the PNL, PSD, and UDMR/RMDSZ is voted and invested															
16–24 Nov 2021	Avangarde	906	40.0	17.0	—N/a	11.0	15.0	5.0	4.0	1.0	1.0	4.0	—N/a	—N/a	2.0	23.0
17–22 Nov 2021	CURS	1,100	38.0	18.0	—N/a	11.0	14.0	5.0	4.0	3.0	1.0	3.0	—N/a	—N/a	3.0	20.0
9–12 Nov 2021	PPU	1,023	30.5	3.0	7.5	23.0	12.0	5.0	6.5	5.5	1.0	2.5	—N/a	2.5	1.0	7.5
before 3 Nov 2021	FL	1,217	34.0		8.0	20.0	12.0	5.0	6.5	5.5	2.0	1.0	—N/a	2.0	4.0	14.0
25–30 Oct 2021	CURS	1,100	39.0	19.0	—N/a	11.0	12.0	5.0	5.0	3.0	—N/a	4.0	—N/a	—N/a	2.0	20.0
17–26 Oct 2021	Avangarde	900	40.0	17.0	—N/a	13.0	14.0	5.0	4.0	2.0	1.0	4.0	—N/a	—N/a	0.0	23.0
15–25 Oct 2021	INSCOP	1,100	35.5	21.9	—N/a	12.4	14.2	5.0	2.9	3.2	—N/a	0.5	—N/a	1.7	2.8	13.6
12–20 Oct 2021	CURS	1,202	39.0	21.0	—N/a	11.0	13.0	5.0	—N/a	—N/a	—N/a	—N/a	—N/a	—N/a	11.0	18.0
12–17 Oct 2021	APP	1,122	30.0	3.0	11.5	17.5	17.0	4.0	6.0	5.0	1.5	—N/a	—N/a	3.5	1.0	12.5
12–17 Oct 2021	INSCOP	1,100	36.7	19.8	—N/a	16.4	15.3	3.0	2.1	3.0	—N/a	—N/a	—N/a	—N/a	3.8	16.9
11–15 Oct 2021	Sociopol	1,002	32.0	20.0	—N/a	13.0	21.0	6.0	—N/a	—N/a	—N/a	—N/a	—N/a	—N/a	8.0	11.0
26–29 Sep 2021	Gazeta Civică	1,202	28.0	17.0		18.0	17.5	5.0	5.5	4.0	1.0	—N/a	—N/a	3.0	2.0	10.0
28 Sep 2021	INSOMAR	1,030	31.6	25.9		15.0	17.0	4.6	2.5	2.3	—N/a	—N/a	—N/a	1.2	0.0	5.7
15–27 Sep 2021	INSCOP	1,204	35.4	21.9		9.8	17.1	—N/a	2.9	4.4	—N/a	—N/a	—N/a	—N/a	8.5	13.5
14–21 Sep 2021	Avangarde	900	37.0	20.0		13.0	14.0	5.0	4.0	1.0	1.0	4.0	—N/a	—N/a	1.0	17.0
8–10 Sep 2021	CURS	861	36.0	19.0		11.0	14.0	5.0	5.0	3.0	2.0	4.0	—N/a	—N/a	1.0	17.0
3–5 Sep 2021	CURS	853	35.0	20.0		11.0	12.0	5.0	5.0	3.0	3.0	4.0	—N/a	—N/a	2.0	15.0
1 Sep 2021	The 2021 Romanian political crisis begins, leading to the break-up of the centre-right governmental coalition and a PNL splinter															
20–24 Aug 2021	Avangarde	900	35.0	21.0		14.0	15.0	5.0	5.0	2.0	—N/a	1.0	—N/a	—N/a	2.0 (Note: PRM - 1.0%)	14.0
12–20 Aug 2021	CURS	1,067	34.0	20.0		12.0	11.0	5.0	5.0	3.0	3.0	4.0	—N/a	—N/a	3.0	14.0
15–19 Aug 2021	IRES	1,006	35.0	27.0		14.0	14.0	5.0	2.0	2.0	1.0	—N/a	—N/a	—N/a	2.0	8.0
26 Jul 2021	INSOMAR	—N/a	38.1	15.1		11.1	15.0	5.1	—N/a	—N/a	—N/a	—N/a	—N/a	—N/a	15.8	23.0
9–19 Jul 2021	Avangarde	903	34.0	23.0		13.0	15.0	5.0	—N/a	—N/a	—N/a	—N/a	—N/a	—N/a	10.0	11.0
1–15 Jul 2021	Sociopol	1,100	31.0	27.0		15.0	10.0	7.0	2.0	3.0	—N/a	—N/a	2.0	—N/a	3.0	4.0
24 Jun 2021	INSOMAR	1,030	22.9	25.0		15.0	18.0	5.1	—N/a	2.0	2.9	—N/a	—N/a	—N/a	7.2	2.1
11–18 Jun 2021	CURS	1,067	34.0	22.0		14.0	12.0	4.0	5.0	2.0	3.0	2.0	—N/a	—N/a	4.0	12.0
1–15 Jun 2021	INSCOP	1,100	30.2	26.6		13.2	14.2	—N/a	2.8	4.3	—N/a	—N/a	—N/a	—N/a	8.7	3.6
18 May 2021	Sociopol	1,100	36	22		15	11	6	2	5	0	1	1	—N/a	1.0 (Note: PRM - 0%)	14.0
18 May 2021	IRES	1,100	36.0	28.0		11.0	14.0	3.0	—N/a	3.0	—N/a	—N/a	1.0	—N/a	8.0	8.0
1–8 May 2021	Avangarde	900	36.0	23.0		14.0	15.0	5.0	2.0	2.0	—N/a	1.0	1.0	—N/a	2.0	13.0
7 May 2021	INSOMAR	1,030	22.1	23.5		13.6	15.5	8.6	4.6	4.1	—N/a	—N/a	—N/a	—N/a	8.4	1.4
14–17 Apr 2021	CURS	1,107	33.0	21.0		16.0	12.0	4.0	5.0	3.0	—N/a	4.0	—N/a	—N/a	2.0	12.0
30 Mar–11 Apr 2021	BCS	1,420	28.9	22.3		22.5	10.0	4.0	4.2	2.9	—N/a	—N/a	—N/a	—N/a	5.1	6.4
12–28 Mar 2021	Sociopol	—N/a	35.0	26.0		17.0	12.0	4.0	3.0	2.0	—N/a	—N/a	—N/a	—N/a	1.0	9.0
22–26 Feb 2021	CURS	1,100	34.0	25.0		16.0	9.0	4.0	3.0	2.0	—N/a	3.0	—N/a	—N/a	4.0	10.0
10–14 Feb 2021	PER	1,055	33.0	25.0		20.0	8.0	4.0	4.0	4.0	2.0	—N/a	3.0	—N/a	4.0	8.0
9–11 Feb 2021	INSOMAR	1,030	28.0	27.0		14.0	16.0	6.0	4.0	1.0	—N/a	—N/a	—N/a	—N/a	4.0	1.0
15–17 Jan 2021	Avangarde	710	34.0	24.0		16.0	14.0	5.0	3.0	1.0	—N/a	—N/a	—N/a	—N/a	3.0	10.0
11–15 Jan 2021	CURS	1,100	34.0	26.0		16.0	12.0	5.0	3.0	2.0	—N/a	—N/a	—N/a	—N/a	2.0	8.0
17–21 Dec 2020	CURS	1,100	35.0	26.0		14.0	15.0	4.0	2.0	2.0	—N/a	—N/a	—N/a	—N/a	2.0	9.0
10–20 Dec 2020	Avangarde	900	35.0	26.0		15.0	14.0	5.0	2.0	1.0	—N/a	—N/a	—N/a	—N/a	2.0	9.0
6 December 2020	2020 Chamber election	—N/a	28.90	25.18		15.37	9.08	5.74	4.82	4.09		1.19	1.12	—N/a	6.82	3.72
6 December 2020	2020 Senate election	—N/a	29.32	25.58		15.86	9.17	5.89	4.93	4.13		1.01	1.33	—N/a	5.12	3.74

== Probable projection of seats in the next parliament ==
166 seats are needed for a chamber majority.

Date	Poll source	PSD	PNL	USR PLUS/USR	AUR	UDMR	PMP	PRO	ApP (Note: Formerly known as PAINE.)	FD	Nat. min.	Lead
19–26 May 2022	CURS	133	88	34	38	19	0	0	0	0	18	45
12–20 Apr 2022	Avangarde	132	70	40	52	18	0	0	0	0	18	62
17–22 Dec 2021	Sociopol	117	53	42	82	18	0	0	0	0	18	35
17–26 Oct 2021	Avangarde	140	59	46	49	18	0	0	0	0	18	81
12–17 Oct 2021	INSCOP	125	68	56	52	11	0	0	0	0	18	57
12–17 Oct 2021	APP	109	42	63	62	14	21	0	0	0	18	46
26–29 Sep 2021	Gazeta Civică	95	57	61	59	17	18	0	0	0	18	34
28 Sep 2021	INSOMAR	104	85	49	56	15	0	0	0	0	18	19
9–19 Jul 2021	Avangarde	118	80	45	52	17	0	0	0	0	18	38
11–15 Jan 2021	CURS	113	88	53	40	18	0	0	0	0	18	25
6 December 2020	2020 Chamber election	110	93	55	33	21	0	0	—N/a	PNL	18	17

== Approval ratings ==
Date	Poll source	Sample size	Ciolacu PSD	Iohannis PNL	Orban PNL/FD	Cîțu PNL	Ciucă PNL	Cioloș USR PLUS	Barna USR PLUS	Dragu USR PLUS	Simion AUR	Kelemen UDMR	Băsescu PMP	Diaconescu PMP
31 Jan 22	CURS	—N/a	27.0	18.0	10.0	11.0	27.0	13.0	—N/a	—N/a	21.0	13.0	11.0	15.0
17–26 Oct 21	Avangarde	900	25.0	14.0	9.0	7.0	—N/a	13.0	9.0	—N/a	20.0	—N/a	—N/a	—N/a
14–21 Sep 21	Avangarde	900	33.0	30.0	—N/a	14.0	16.0	12.0	12.0	—N/a	14.0	—N/a	—N/a	—N/a
12–20 Aug 21	CURS	1,100	27.0	32.0	—N/a	18.0	14.0	16.0	14.0	11.0	15.0	12.0	11.0	17.0
11–18 Jun 21	CURS	1,067	26.0	33.0	—N/a	19.0	15.0	18.0	14.0	14.0	18.0	11.0	14.0	17.0
6 May 21	INSOMAR	1,030	20.1	—N/a	21.9	—N/a	—N/a	8.2	12.0	—N/a	14.1	—N/a	—N/a	8.3
14–17 Apr 21	CURS	1,107	26.0	—N/a	20.0	24.0	—N/a	16.0	15.0	—N/a	21.0	13.0	—N/a	—N/a
11 Apr 21	BCS	1,420	14.0	—N/a	17.5	21.6	—N/a	18.6	16.8	—N/a	12.2	6.5	16.6	11.8
22–26 Feb 21	CURS	1,100	25.0	37.0	—N/a	17.0	14.0	20.0	18.0	14.0	20.0	18.0	—N/a	—N/a

== 2021 political crisis poll ==
Polling firm	Date	Question	Iohannis	PNL	USR	Cîțu	PSD	N/A
Avangarde	Oct 2021	Who is the main culprit (i.e. guilty) for the current political crisis?	18%	14%	11%	8%	1%	48%

=== Approval ratings of Florin Cîțu as prime minister ===
Polling firm	Fieldwork date	Sample size	Florin Cîțu PNL			
Polling firm	Fieldwork date	Sample size	check	X mark	Question	Net
CURS	25–30 Oct 2021	1,100	10.0	81.0	9.0	−71.0
Avangarde	17–26 Oct 2021	900	7.0	74.0	19.0	−67.0
Avangarde	14–21 Sep 2021	900	14.0	61.0	25.0	−47.0
CURS	12–20 Aug 2021	1,100	18.0	77.0	5.0	−59.0
CURS	11–18 Jun 2021	1,067	19.0	75.0	6.0	−56.0
CURS	14–17 Apr 2021	1,107	24.0	69.0	7.0	−45.0
BCS	11 Apr 2021	1,420	21.6	68.5	9.8	−46.9

== National approval rating ==
Polling firm	Fieldwork date	Sample size	Is Romania going on a good path/direction?			
Polling firm	Fieldwork date	Sample size	check	X mark	Question	Net
Polling firm	Fieldwork date	Sample size	Approved	Disapproval	Question	Net
Avangarde	17–26 Oct 2021	900	8.0	80.0	12.0	−72.0
