= George Ciamba =

Romanian diplomat (1966–2021)

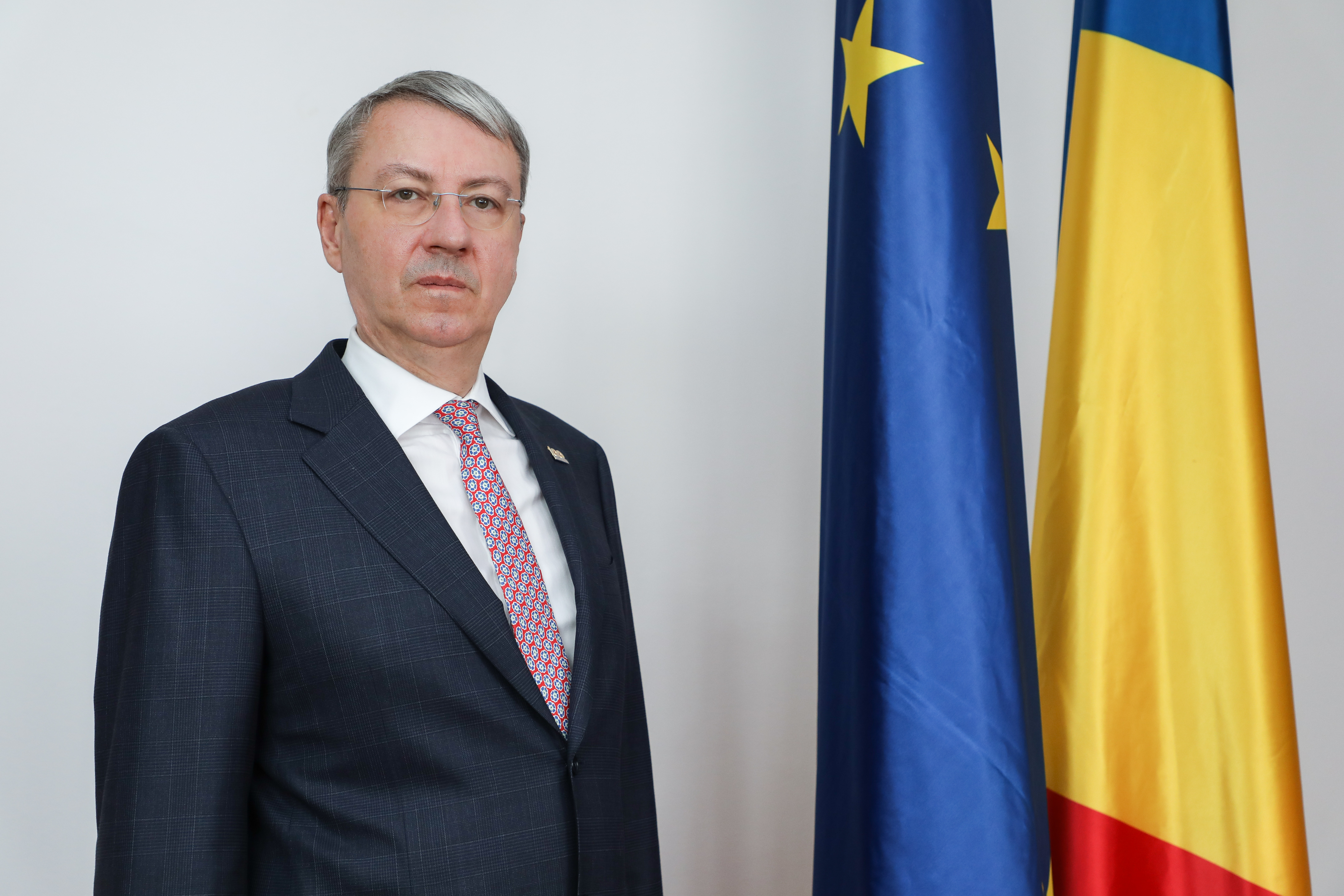
- Minister Delegate for European Affairs

Minister for European Affairs
- In office 14 November 2018 – 4 November 2019
- Preceded by: Victor Negrescu

Secretary of State for Bilateral and Strategic Affairs in the Euro-Atlantic Area
- In office 4 January 2017 – 13 November 2018

Secretary of State for European Affairs
- In office 2012–2016

Ambassador to Greece
- In office 2005–2012

Permanent Representative of Romania to the Black Sea Economic Cooperation Organization
- In office 1999–2003

Personal details
- Born: February 20, 1966 Bucharest, Socialist Republic of Romania
- Died: July 11, 2021 (aged 55)
- Profession: Diplomat
- Awards: The National Merit Order – Commander Class

George Ciamba (February 20, 1966 – July 11, 2021) was a Romanian diplomat who served, from November 2018 to November 2019, as the Romanian Minister for European Affairs, including during Romania's 2019 first presidency of the Council of the European Union.

== Diplomatic career ==
From 1999 to 2003, he was ambassador to Turkey and Permanent Representative of Romania to the Black Sea Economic Cooperation Organization. He was ambassador to Greece from 2005 to 2012.

== Term as Minister for European Affairs and Romania's first Presidency of the Council of the European Union ==
George Ciamba served as Minister for European Affairs during Romania's first presidency of the Council of the European Union.

=== Romania's first Presidency of the Council of the European Union ===
Romania took over the rotating presidency of the Council of the European Union, from January until June 2019, the first occasion since its EU accession. The motto of the Romanian Presidency was 'Cohesion, a Common European Value'.

It was preceded at the helm of the Council of the EU by Austria (July–December 2018) and succeeded by Finland (July–December 2019).

Member states holding the presidency work together closely in groups of three, called 'trios'. Romania was part of the Trio format alongside Finland and Croatia.

=== Results ===
During the Romanian Presidency of the Council of the EU, approximately 2,500 meetings and events were organized: the Sibiu Summit, over 2,000 meetings of working groups, 64 EU Council ministerial meetings, and a total of 300 events which were held in Romania.

90 legislative files were closed in a record time of three months, by the end of European Parliament's legislative activity - on average, one file per day. 84 EU Council Conclusions were adopted on multiple topics of common interest, numerous Progress Reports of the Presidency were developed, and a number of Council Decisions were approved.

== Distinctions ==
- 1999: Romanian Ambassador of the Year, Romanian Daily.
- 2000: National Order of Merit in the Rank of Commander - awarded by the President of Romania.
- 2012: Order of the Phoenix – Grand Cross Grade - awarded by the President of the Hellenic Republic.
