= Răzvan Popa =

Răzvan Popa may refer to:

- Răzvan Popa (footballer) (born 1997), Romanian footballer
- Răzvan Popa (politician) (born 1978), Romanian politician
