= Elena Cuza National College =

Elena Cuza National College (Romanian: Colegiul Naţional "Elena Cuza") may refer to one of two educational institutions in Romania:

- Elena Cuza National College (Bucharest)
- Elena Cuza National College (Craiova)
