= Marius-Constantin Budăi =

Romanian politician (born 1972)

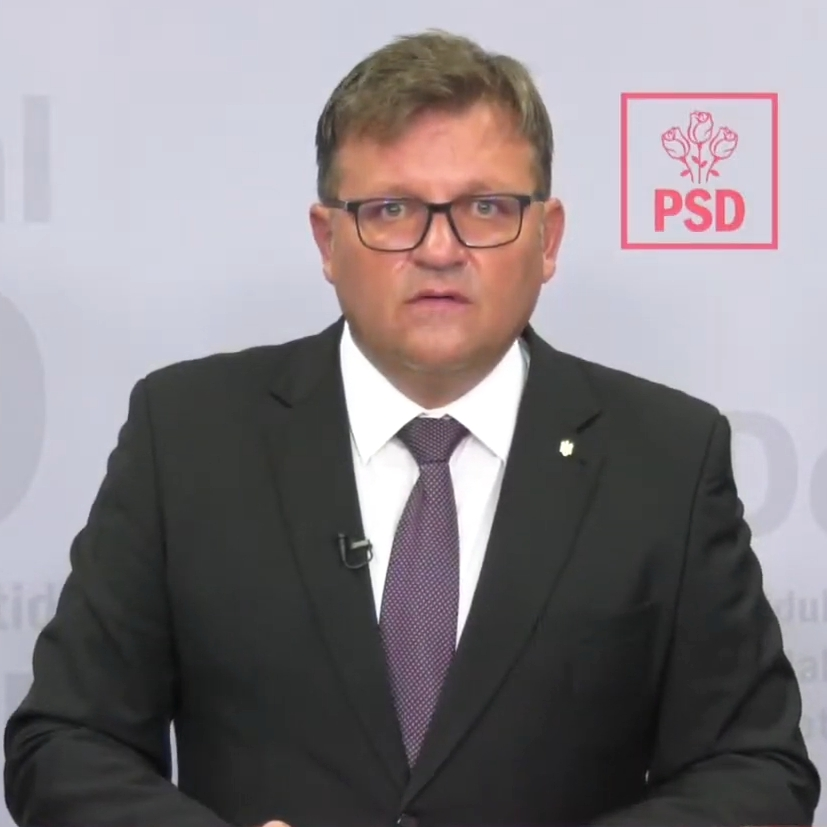
- Budăi in 2020

Minister of Labor and Social Protection
- In office 25 November 2021 – 13 July 2023
- Preceded by: Raluca Turcan
- Succeeded by: Marian Neacșu (ad interim)
- In office 20 November 2018 – 4 November 2019
- Preceded by: Lia Olguța Vasilescu
- Succeeded by: Violeta Alexandru

Member of the Romanian Chamber of Deputies
- Incumbent
- Assumed office 20 December 2016
- Constituency: Botoșani County

Personal details
- Born: 1 May 1972 (age 53) Curtești, Botoșani, Romania
- Political party: Social Democratic Party

Marius-Constantin Budăi (born 1 May 1972) is a Romanian deputy, elected in 2016 and 2020.

In November 2021, he became Minister of Labor and Social Protection in the Government of Nicolae Ciucă. He was also the Minister of Labor and Social Protection in the Government of Viorica Dăncilă.

== Curriculum vitae ==
In 1990, he graduated from high school in Botoșani. He then obtained a BA in Finance and Banking (2008) and an MA in Public Finance Management (2010) from Universitatea Spiru Haret in Bucharest. He also studied project management, accounting and public management. For several years he worked as a clerk and inspector in the local social welfare in Botosani, in 2009 he got to a managerial position. Also employed as a coordinator in a courier company and an advisor in the parliament. From 2013 to 2016, he was the executive director of the local branch of the social insurance fund Casa Naţională de Pensii Publice.

He joined the Social Democratic Party, and in 2016 he was elected to the Chamber of Deputies on its behalf. In November 2018, he was appointed Minister of Labor and Social Justice in the government of Viorica Dăncilă. He left office with the entire government in November 2019. In the 2020 elections, he successfully ran for parliamentary re-election. In November 2021, he became the Minister of Labor and Social Protection, joining the then-appointed cabinet of Nicolae Ciucă.
