= Alin Mituța =

Romanian politician (born 1984)

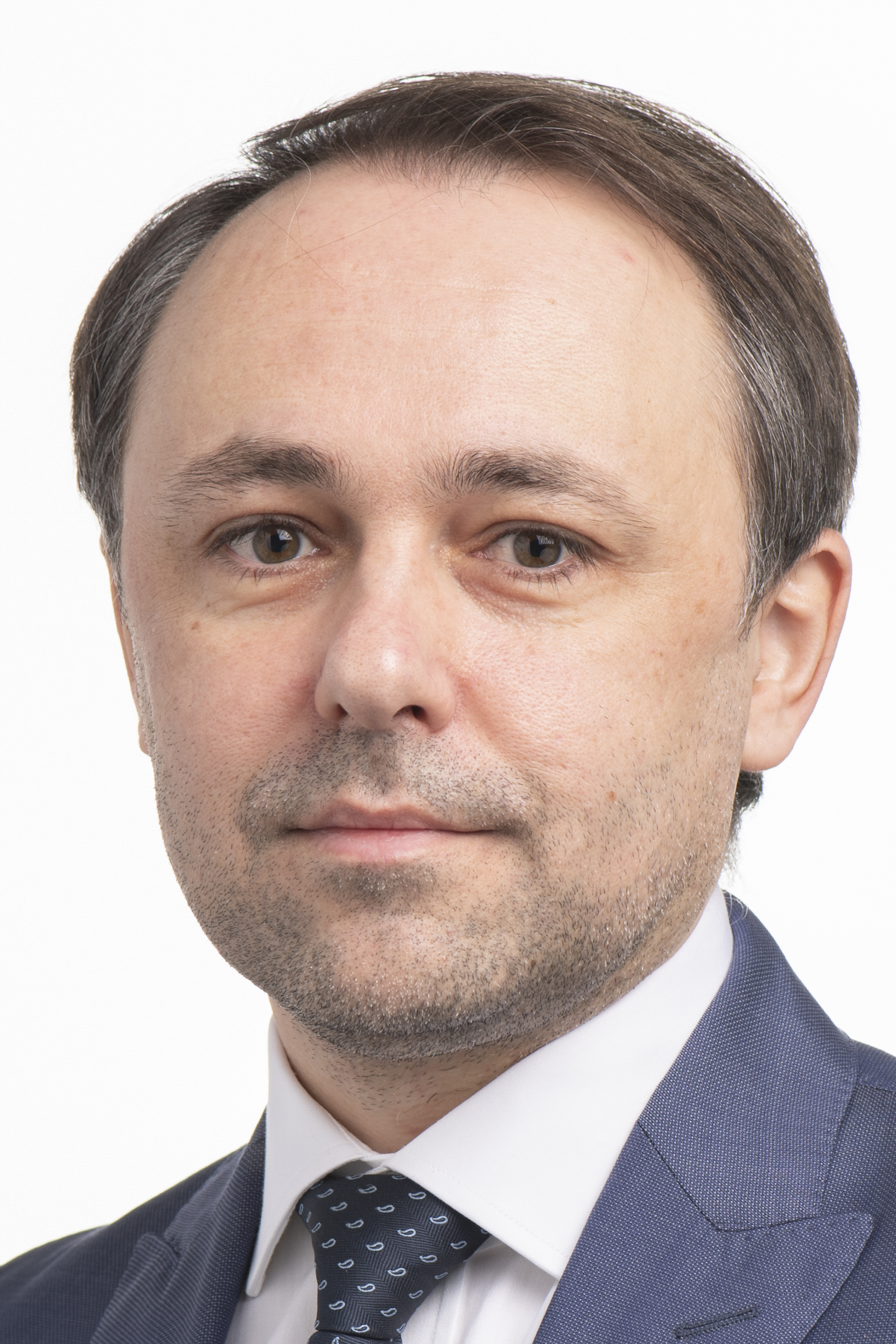

Member of the European Parliament
- Incumbent
- Assumed office 28 December 2020
- Parliamentary group: Renew Europe

Personal details
- Born: 24 May 1984 (age 42) Novaci, Gorj County, Romania
- Party: REPER (since 2022)
- Education: Sciences Po Paris; Université Paris Nanterre; National University of Political Studies and Public Administration

Alin Cristian Mituța (born 24 May 1984) is a Romanian politician of REPER who has been serving as Member of the European Parliament since 2020.

His work focuses mainly on digital policies and institutional reform of the European Union.

== Early life and education ==
Mituța holds a master's degree in European affairs from Sciences Po Paris (2009), a BA in political science from Paris Nanterre University (2007), as well as a BA in international relations and European studies from the National University of Political Studies and Public Administration (2007). He was an Erasmus student at the Paris Nanterre University in 2006/2007.

== Early career ==
After his studies, Mituța followed a career in the European institutions as a civil servant. He was a cofounder and executive director of Europuls, a Romanian think-tank specialised in EU policies.

== Political career ==
=== Career in national politics ===
In 2016, Mituța became Secretary of State and Head of Cabinet of Prime Minister Dacian Cioloș. Later, he was a co-founder of Platforma România 100 and Mișcarea România Împreună, the organisations which led to the creation of Freedom, Unity and Solidarity Party, of which he is currently a member of the National Bureau.

In May 2022, Mituța resigned from USR and launched a new party called REPER with Dacian Cioloș, Dragoș Tudorache, Dragoș Pîslaru and Ramona Strugariu.

=== Member of the European Parliament ===
In 2019, Mituța ran as a candidate for the European Parliament on the list of the 2020 USR-PLUS Alliance (Romanian: Alianța 2020 USR-PLUS).

In the European Parliament, Mituța is affiliated with the Renew Europe Group and he is a member of the Committee on Budgetary Control (CONT) and the Committee on Agriculture and Rural Development (AGRI). He is also a substitute member of the Committee on Industry, Research and Energy(ITRE), Committee on Constitutional Affairs (AFCO), the Committee on Regional Development (REGI), the Committee on Employment and Social Affairs (EMPL) and the Special Committee on Beating Cancer (BECA). Since 2021, he has been part of the Parliament's delegation to the Conference on the Future of Europe.

In addition to his committee assignments, Mituța is a member of the parliament's delegation to the EU-Moldova Parliamentary Association Committee (D-MD) and substitute member of its delegation to the Euronest Parliamentary Assembly (DEPA).

Most notably, Mituța is the leading rapporteur on the Gigabit Infrastructure Act, as well as shadow rapporteur on the European Data Act (European Union) and the European eID Regulation.

== Political positions ==
As rapporteur for Gigabit Infrastructure Act he proposed and negotiated into law the abolition of the extra-fees for intra-EU communication (calls and SMS).

In 2021, Mituța initiated a letter to Ursula von der Leyen and Maroš Šefčovič co-signed by seven other Members in which they call on the European Commission to stop the United Kingdom from holding EU nationals in immigration removal centers.

In March 2022, he initiated a call, supported by other 21 MEPs, to Christine Lagarde, the president of the European Central Bank, to take measures so that Ukrainian refugees fleeing the war be able to convert their hryvnia to the currencies of EU Member States.
