= 2020 Croatian Presidency of the Council of the European Union =

Presidency of the Council of the European Union

Croatian Presidency of the Council of the European Union

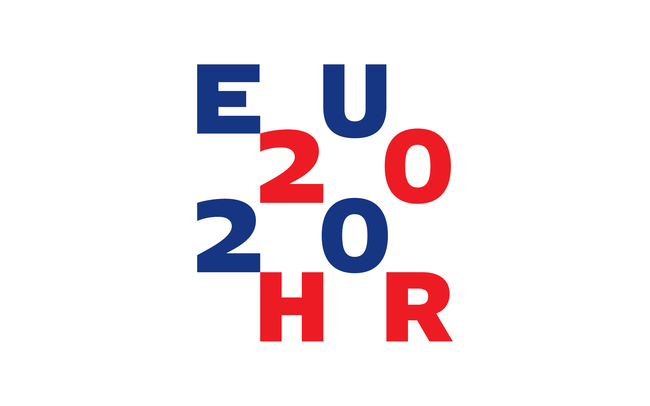
- Logo of the 2020 Croatian presidency 1 January – 30 June 2020
- Council of the European Union
- Website: https://eu2020.hr

Presidency trio
- Romania; Finland; Croatia

Croatia held the presidency of the Council of the European Union (Croatian: Hrvatsko predsjedanje Vijećem Europske unije, known by acronyms EU2020HR and HRPRES 2020) during the first half of 2020. The presidency was the last of three presidencies making up a presidency trio, which began with the presidency of Romania, followed by that of Finland. It was the first time Croatia had held the presidency; the country acceded to the European Union in 2013.

During the presidency, the United Kingdom left the European Union (Brexit), and the European Union responded to the coronavirus outbreak, which was declared a global pandemic in March.

== Identity ==
In 2018, the Ministry of Culture and the Ministry of Foreign and European Affairs held a public design competition for the Presidency, organised by the Croatian Designers Association. Work called ”Typographic Chessboard” won, whose letters and numbers relative position evokes squares, forming an acronym "EU2020HR", with dark blue representing the Council of the European Union and red symbolising Croatia. The squares represent ”the multidimensionality and complexity of this project and the content it communicates” as well as "common Croatian and European cultural, social and political journey through the past, present and future”.

== Priorities ==
Four major priorities of the presidency were presented by Prime Minister of Croatia Andrej Plenković at the conference "A strong Europe in a world of challenges", held on 30 October 2019 in the National and University Library in Zagreb:

- A Europe that develops
- A Europe that connects
- A Europe that protects
- An influential Europe.

== Overview ==
Pre-presidency work conferences presided by some of the ministers of the Government of Croatia were held in Split, Rijeka, Osijek and Varaždin.

Presidency was opened on January 9, 2020, by joint assembly of both members of the Croatian Government and the Council, followed by concert in the Croatian National Theatre in Zagreb. The next day, prime minister of Croatia Andrej Plenković and president of the European Commission Ursula von der Leyen held a press conference at the Congress Hall of the National and University Library.

At the start of the presidency, two of Croatia's main priorities were dealing with issues arising from Brexit, and negotiating with Balkan countries that were interested in joining the European Union.

The coronavirus pandemic forced the presidency into crisis mode, and although there were some disjointed efforts during the early stages of the pandemic, the European Union came together to work on a number of common goals, including bringing more than 500,000 European Union citizens stranded elsewhere in the world back home, and proposing a coronavirus relief package worth hundreds of billions of euros.

== Cultural events ==
Dozens of cultural events were planned to be held during the Presidency, mostly concerts, theatre plays and exhibitions of Croatian artists in EU countries. Among them, concerts of LADO National Folk Songs and Dances Ensemble, The Zagreb Soloists, Zagreb Quartet and Croatian Baroque Ensemble, Retrospective of Croatian Film Classics, exhibition ”Zagreb - Budapest” at the Hungarian National Museum, guest performances of the Croatian National Theatre in Zagreb etc.

== Gallery ==
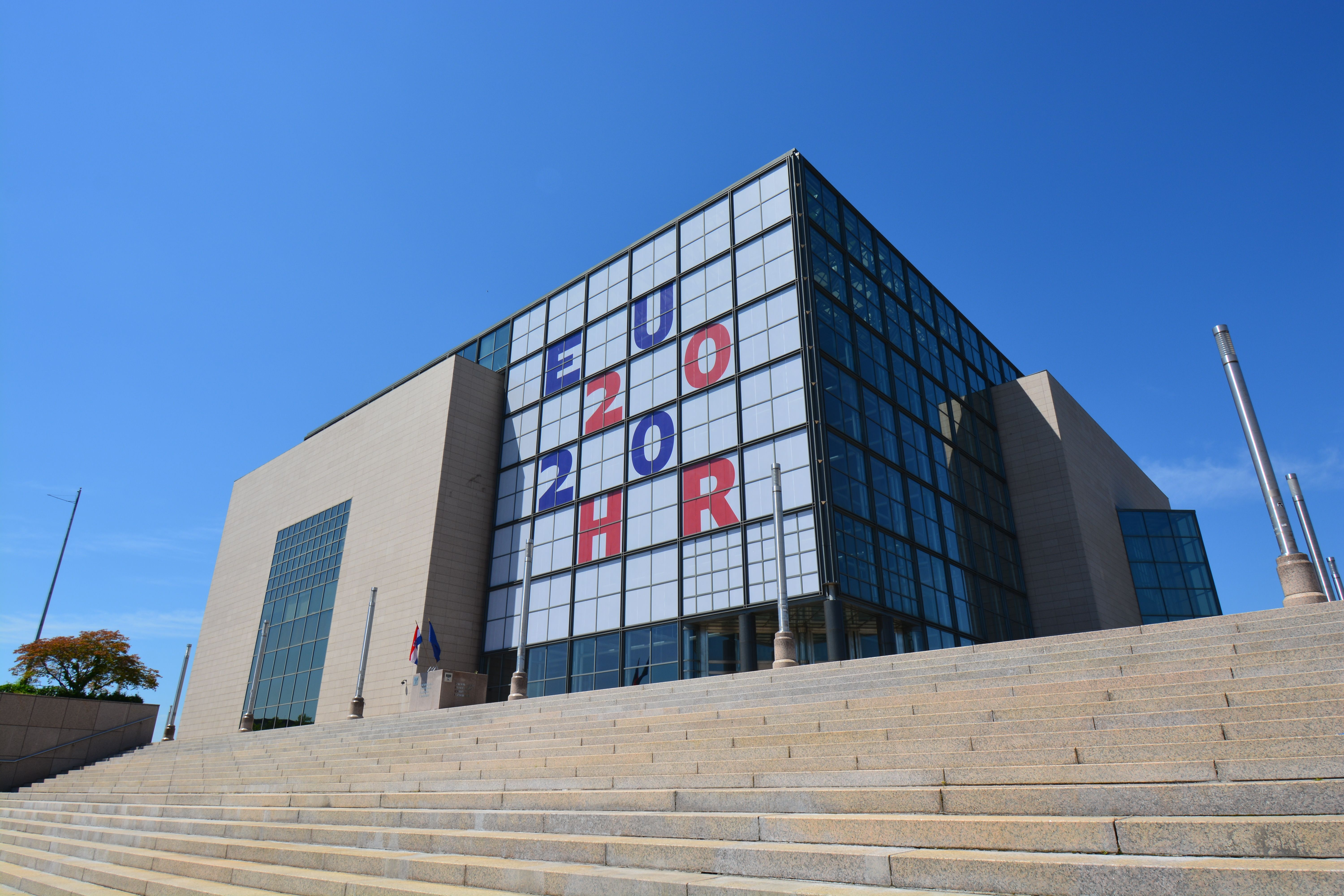
The National and University Library in Zagreb during the presidency, featuring the presidency's logo on its windows

== See also ==
- Croatia and the European Union
