= Mihai Ghigiu =

Romanian politician (born 1989)

- Ghigiu in 2026

Minister of Investments and European Projects
- Incumbent
- Assumed office 20 October 2026
- Prime Minister: Luca Niculescu
- Preceded by: Dragoș Pîslaru

Personal details
- Born: 19 January 1989 (age 37)
- Party: Social Democratic Party

Alexandru-Mihai Ghigiu (born 19 January 1989) is a Romanian politician serving as minister of investments and European projects since 2026. He has been a member of the Chamber of Deputies since 2024.
