= Renewing Romania's European Project =

Political party in Romania

Renewing Romania's European Project Reînnoim Proiectul European al României
- Abbreviation: REPER
- President: Camelia Sălcudean
- Founder: Dacian Cioloș; Ramona Strugariu; Alin Mituța; Dragoș Tudorache
- Founded: 31 May 2022
- Split from: Save Romania Union (USR)
- Preceded by: Freedom, Unity and Solidarity Party (PLUS) (unofficially)
- Ideology: Liberalism; Pro-Europeanism
- Political position: Centre
- National affiliation: Platform for Democracy, Prosperity, and Progress
- European Parliament group: Renew Europe
- Colours: Magenta
- European Parliament: 0 / 33
- Senate: 0 / 136
- Chamber of Deputies: 0 / 330
- Ministers: 1 / 16

Website
- partidulreper.ro

Renewing Romania's European Project (Romanian: Reînnoim Proiectul European al României, REPER) is a political party in Romania. It is a splinter of the Save Romania Union (USR) and is currently led by president Camelia Sălcudean. The party was founded in May 2022, in opposition to USR's leadership under Cătălin Drulă. The party is mostly associated with former technocratic Prime Minister and former USR president Dacian Cioloș, who founded the party. On 7 May 2023, Dragoș Pîslaru and Ramona Strugariu were voted co-presidents at the latest congress of the party.

== History ==
=== Background ===
On 30 March 2018, Dacian Cioloș announced his plans to establish a new political party, called the "Romania Together Movement". However, its official registration was never finalized due to various appeals and delays in the legal process. This was abandoned in favor of the Freedom, Unity and Solidarity Party (PLUS), which was registered in December 2018 by three colleagues of Cioloș. On 26 January 2019, PLUS organized its first National Convention, where Cioloș was elected president of the party.

Soon after Cioloș took the party presidency, it was announced that PLUS will form an electoral alliance with the Save Romania Union (USR), known as the 2020 USR-PLUS Alliance, to participate together in the 2019 European Parliament election in Romania, and subsequently in the 2019 presidential election and the 2020 local and legislative elections as well.

On 15 August 2020, USR and PLUS organized a joint congress to decide whether to formally unite the two parties or not, with 84.65% of the participants voting in favor of a merger. The merger was approved by the Bucharest Court of Appeal on 16 April 2021.

In October 2021, after a joint leadership with Dan Barna, Cioloș was elected the sole president of the new party, which retained the "Save Romania Union" name. Four months later, in February 2022, Cioloș resigned as USR president after his presidential project was rejected by the party's National Bureau, with a vote of 14–11. He stated, however, that he would remain member of the party.

=== Formation ===
On 31 May 2022, Dacian Cioloș, along with four other MEPs, resigned from the Save Romania Union (USR), criticizing the leadership of the party: "We do not see in the USR leadership either the desire or the maturity to accept the mistakes of the past and to change a direction that leads the party to political irrelevance". Cioloș and his supporters then announced the formation of a new party, more specifically "Renewing Romania's European Project" (or "REPER" for short). This announcement was met with waves of irony stemming from prominent USR members, including Bucharest Sector 1 mayor Clotilde Armand, former Justice Minister Stelian Ion, and Cosette Chichirău, as well as incumbent party president Cătălin Drulă or former party president Dan Barna.

Until the party's first congress, the party was led by Dragoș Pîslaru and Ramona Strugariu as acting/ad interim co-presidents. Cioloș chose not to hold a position within the party leadership.

On 24 September 2024, DEMOS, NOW and REPER announced an electoral alliance to contest the 2024 Romanian legislative election, the Platform for Democracy, Prosperity, and Progress.

== Electoral history ==
=== European elections ===
Election	Votes	Percentage	MEPs	Position	EU Party	EP Group
2024	334,703	3.74%	0 / 33	6th	RE	

=== Legislative elections ===
Election	Chamber			Senate			Position	Aftermath
Election	Votes	%	Seats	Votes	%	Seats	Position	Aftermath
2024	114,223	1.24	0 / 331	126,408	1.37	0 / 136	11th	Extraparliamentary opposition to PSD-PNL-UDMR minority government (2024–2025)
2024	114,223	1.24	0 / 331	126,408	1.37	0 / 136	11th	Extraparliamentary participation in PSD-PNL-USR-UDMR government (2025–present)

=== Presidential elections ===
Year	Candidate	First round			Second round		
Year	Candidate	Votes	Percentage	Position	Votes	Percentage	Position
2025	Nicușor Dan^{1}	1,979,767	20.99%	2nd	6,168,696	53.60%	1st

Note

^{1}Independent candidate endorsed by the REPER
