= Violeta Alexandru =

Romanian politician (born 1975)

Minister of Labour and Social Protection
- In office 4 November 2019 – 23 December 2020
- Prime Minister: Ludovic Orban; Nicolae Ciucă (Acting)
- Preceded by: Marius-Constantin Budăi
- Succeeded by: Raluca Turcan

Personal details
- Born: 11 November 1975 (age 50)

Violeta Alexandru (born 11 November 1975) is a Romanian politician. She served as Minister of Labour and Social Protection in the first Orban Cabinet led by Prime Minister Ludovic Orban. She also served in the same position in the second Orban cabinet.

== Biography ==
Victoria Alexandru[1] graduated from the University of Bucharest. She subsequently studied at the National School of Political and Administrative Studies.

Between 1994 and 1997, she worked as a coordinator at the NGO Asociación Pro Democracia (APD). From 1997 to 1999, she worked in the presidential administration, where she dealt with issues related to the Romanian diaspora. In 1999, she returned to APD as executive director until 2001, being a founding member of the Institute for Public Policy, where she held the position of director. She also held the position of Minister Delegate for Social Dialogue between November 17, 2015, and January 4, 2017, in the Dacian Cioloș government.

Later, he became involved in political activities within the National Liberal Party. In November 2019, he became Minister of Labor and Social Protection in Ludovic Orban's government at the time.
