= Victor Negrescu =

Romanian academic and politician

Victor Negrescu MEP
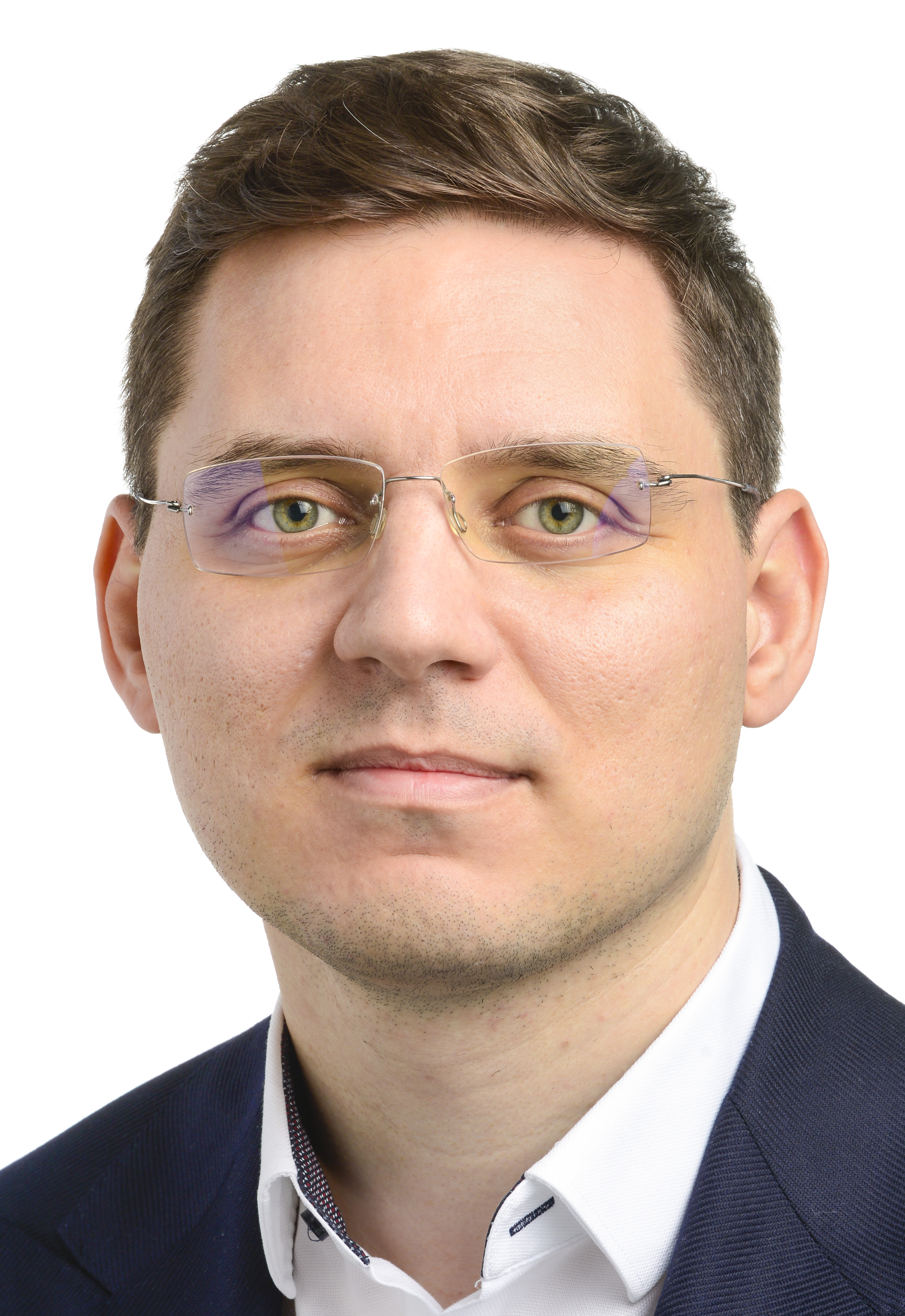
- Official portrait, 2024

Minister for European Affairs
- In office 29 June 2017 – 10 November 2018
- Prime Minister: Mihai Tudose; Mihai Fifor; Viorica Dăncilă
- Preceded by: Ana Birchall
- Succeeded by: George Ciamba

Member of the European Parliament for Romania
- Incumbent
- Assumed office 1 February 2020
- In office 1 July 2014 – 29 June 2017
- Succeeded by: Răzvan Popa

Personal details
- Born: 17 August 1985 (age 41) Alba Iulia, Romania
- Party: PSD (2007–present)
- Education: National University of Political Studies and Public Administration

Victor Negrescu (Note: Romanian pronunciation: [ˈviktor neˈɡresku]) (born 17 August 1985) is a Romanian politician of the Social Democratic Party (PSD). He is a Member of European Parliament and he was Minister Delegate for European Affairs in the government of Romania between 2017 and 2018. Since 2007, he is the president and national coordinator of the Romanian network of PES activists.

== Political career ==
=== Member of the European Parliament (2014–2017; since 2020) ===
Victor Negrescu was born in 1985 in Alba Iulia into the family of diplomat Ion Negrescu, who was Romania's consul in Brussels, which is why Victor completed his pre-university studies there.

Between 2014 and 2017, Negrescu was a Member of the European Parliament. As an MEP, he was a member of the Progressive Alliance of Socialists and Democrats. In the European Parliament he served as member of the Committee on Budgets and as substitute member of both the Committee on Industry, Research and Energy and the Committee on Legal Affairs. On the latter, he was the Parliament's rapporteur on the establishment of the European Public Prosecutor's Office (EPPO).

In addition to his committee assignments, he was also a board member of EU40, the network of young Members of the European Parliament, as well as the coordinator of S&D40, the network of the young S&D MEPs in the European Parliament.

During his three-year period as an MEP, Negrescu participated in 94% of the roll-call votes, with 96% of loyalty to his political group, the Progressive Alliance of Socialists and Democrats, and 97% of loyalty to his national party in Romania, the Social Democratic Party. During this period he was also responsible for 16 reports and 9 opinions as shadow rapporteur, and was the author of amendments to 108 reports.

As a member of the European Parliament, Negrescu sought to promote the Romanian IT sector and IT entrepreneurs, as well as to contribute to the development of the European digital sector. In his view, internet can become a tool to combat social exclusion, promote equal opportunities and social justice. In 2015, together with EU40, he hosted an exhibition called “Backstage with Europe’s Creators” in the European Parliament.

He initiated several EU-funded pilot projects worth more than 8 million EUR for the Romanian research industry and for the development of the IT sector, as well as a pilot project which allocates 1 million EUR to enable access to health care in rural areas.

One of his main stated goals as an MEP was supporting youth in the EU, through initiatives to combat unemployment, ensure job creation, access to culture and European funds. His work was focused not only on students, but also on young entrepreneurs and researchers.

Negrescu was one of the MEPs involved in the mobilization of European funds to support redundant European workers in several countries.

=== Minister delegate for European Affairs, 2017–2018 ===
In June 2017, Negrescu became the youngest member of the Tudose Cabinet, as a Minister delegate for European Affairs, stating that his ministerial mandate has two pillars: national consensus on European matters and ensuring democratic access to information about European matters.

As a Minister Delegate for European Affairs, Negrescu coordinated the preparation of the 2019 Romanian Presidency of the Council of the European Union. In his mandate, the training of over 1,500 civil servants who would work for the Presidency began, the official slogan and the first version of the 2019 Presidency's themes of interest were adopted and the dialogue with European officials, as well as with Finland and Croatia – the countries that together with Romania are part of the Presidency Trio – was strengthened.

In the context of Brexit, Negrescu was part of the team which defined the strategy of the Romanian Government in the Brexit process. He met with representatives of the Romanian community in the UK and held consultations with the European Union negotiating team.

During his mandate as Minister Delegate for European Affairs, Romania obtained the presidency of the European Union Strategy for the Danube Region (EUSDR) for the period between 1 November 2018 and 1 November 2019.

Negrescu supported the European integration of the Republic of Moldova and contributed to the intensification of the political and diplomatic cooperation between the two countries. On June 25, 2018, Victor Negrescu chaired, along with the Deputy Prime Minister for European Integration of the Republic of Moldova, Iurie Leanca, the 5th session of the Intergovernmental Commission Romania-Moldova for European Integration.

Negrescu resigned from his office on 10 November 2018, stating that Romania was ready to take over the Presidency of the Council of the European Union and adding: "I considered that in order to carry out my mandate I need to have all the means at disposal to perform best and fulfill this mission the way I had done by then, observing certain professional standards and requirements, and respecting everything that to me signifies common values and European customs and traditions".

During the term of office, he created for the first time for Romania a trio format consisting of the ministers of European Affairs from France, Germany and Romania, with whom he had several working meetings.

=== Member of the European Parliament, 2020–present ===
In February 2020, Negrescu took office as a member of the European Parliament, after the United Kingdom left the European Union. He became the 33rd MEP from the Romanian delegation to the European Parliament and the 11th member of the Romanian delegation from the S&D Group.

Negrescu is a member of the Committee on Culture and Education and the Committee on Budgets. In 2021, he served as his parliamentary group’s lead negotiator on the budget of the European Union for 2022.

In July 2024, Negrescu was elected vice-president of the European Parliament.

== Academic career ==
In 2009 Negrescu started teaching at the Dimitrie Cantemir Christian University in Bucharest. Since 2012 he is a lecturer at the National School of Political Science and Public Administration, where he has developed a Master's programme in English on Development, International Cooperation and Humanitarian Aid, as well as a research center – the Institute for International Cooperation and Development. He was also Vice-Rector of SNSPA (2019), the main responsibility being the coordination of projects and activities aimed at developing the European profile of the university. In this respect, he was involved in the project of the European University of Social Sciences - CIVICA, a European university consortium which SNSPA is part of.

He holds an MBA in executive business and a PhD in development cooperation.

== Recognition ==
Negrescu won the "MEP of the Year" Award in the Digital Agenda category of the MEP Awards 2015.
