= Pétru Faragó =

Romanian politician (born 1977)

Member of the Chamber of Deputies
- Incumbent
- Assumed office 21 December 2020
- Constituency: Gorj

Personal details
- Born: November 6, 1977 (age 48)
- Party: The Democratic Alliance of Hungarians in Romania

Pétru Faragó is an ethnic Hungarian-Romanian politician who is member of the Chamber of Deputies

== Biography ==
He was elected in 2012, 2016, and 2020.
