= Florin Manole =

Romanian politician (born 1983)

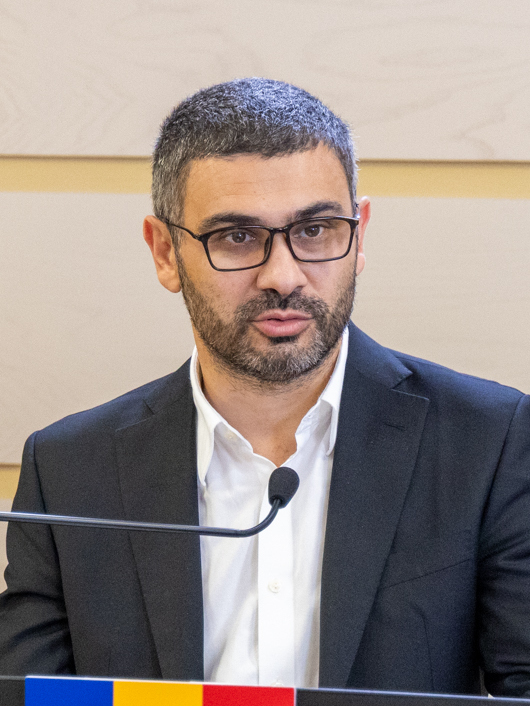
- Manole in 2025

Minister of Labour, Family, Youth, and Social Solidarity
- Incumbent
- Assumed office 20 October 2026
- Prime Minister: Luca Niculescu
- Preceded by: Dragoș Pîslaru (acting)
- In office 23 June 2025 – 25 April 2026
- Prime Minister: Ilie Bolojan
- Preceded by: Simona Bucura-Oprescu
- Succeeded by: Dragoș Pîslaru (acting)

Member of the Chamber of Deputies
- Incumbent
- Assumed office 4 December 2023
- Preceded by: Carmen Mihălcescu
- Constituency: Bucharest

Personal details
- Born: 6 October 1983 (age 43)
- Party: Social Democratic Party

Petre-Florin Manole (born 6 October 1983) is a Romanian politician who has been nominated to serve as minister of labor. He has been a member of the Chamber of Deputies since 2023, having previously served from 2016 to 2020.

Manole is an ethnic Roma, the first Roma person to hold a post as minister in Romania.
