= Marian-Jean Marinescu =

Romanian politician

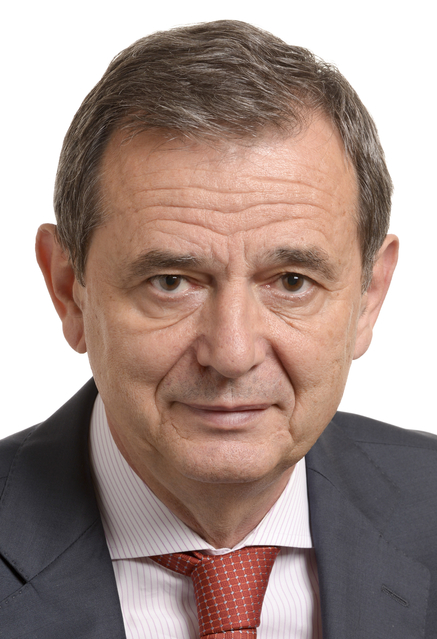
MEP Marian-Jean Marinescu

Marian-Jean Marinescu (born August 11, 1952) is a Romanian politician and member of PNL, part of the European People's Party–European Democrats. Elected to the Chamber of Deputies for Dolj County, he became a Member of the European Parliament in January 2007, with the accession of Romania to the European Union. He is a Grand Officer of the Order of the Star of Romania. Marian-Jean Marinescu has been vice-president of the PPE Group for two legislatures, chair of the PPE Working Group "Budgets and Structural Policies", coordinator of the PPE working group for the Multiannual Financial Framework 2021–2027, Vice-Coordinator of the Transport and Tourism Commission (TRAN), vice-president of the "Sky and Space" Intergroup, member of the Board of Directors of the European Agency for Global Navigation Satellite Systems (GSA), ambassador and founding member of the Erasmus program for entrepreneurs . In the new legislature 2019–2024, Marian-Jean Marinescu continues his activity in the committees of which he was a member previously, namely: member in the Committee on Transport and Tourism (TRAN), alternate member in the Committee on Industry, Research and Energy (ITRE) and an alternate member of the Committee on Budgetary Control (CONT), as well as coordinator of the PPE group for transport policies. A fluent speaker of French and English, Marian-Jean Marinescu has a solid administrative experience at national level, being deputy in the Romanian Parliament, County Councilor - Dolj County Council - Municipal Councilor Local Craiova and Prefect - Dolj County Prefect Institution. During the activity, Marian-Jean Marinescu was twice awarded the MEP of the Year (2014 and 2016), in the Research - Innovation section, the Personality of the Year Award in the field of aviation, granted by the European Business Aviation Association (EBAA) in 2017, Red Arrow Award 2017 for Europe's Essential Commitment - Future Business Austria Conference. In the 2014 - 2019 legislature Marinescu was ranked the most active Romanian MEP, with a portfolio of 15 reports as principal rapporteur, 20 alternative reports and 5 opinion reports, as well as one of the ones more influential Romanian MEPs, according to VoteWatch's April 2019 ranking.

Born in Râmnicu Vâlcea, Marinescu graduated from the Bucharest Politehnica Institute's Faculty of Aerospace engineering in 1976, and subsequently worked as an engineer for Avioane SA and Aviation Institute branch in Craiova.

He entered politics in 1992, as a member of the PDL (known then as Democratic Party, PD), when he was elected a member of the Craiova City Council. Marinescu was elected vice-president of the PD local section in Craiova (1994) and Dolj County (1997), and, in 2001, Secretary for Dolj County and Oltenia. He served as prefect of Dolj under the Romanian Democratic Convention cabinet (1996–2000), and, after 2004, he was a member of the Dolj County Council, before winning a seat in the 2004 legislative election on the Justice and Truth common list.

In December 2020, Marinescu received the Transport & Tourism award at The Parliament Magazine's annual MEP Awards.

He is married with three children.
