= Romanian Sovereigntist Bloc =

Romanian Sovereigntist Bloc Blocul Suveranist Român
- Leader: Florin Eremia; Cosmin Vatafu; Vasil Ciocotis
- President: Florin Eremia
- Founded: 25 November 2023
- Ideology: Romanian nationalism Sovereigntism; National populism Social conservatism
- Alliance parties: Romanian Nationhood Party; Reformist Party; National Peasants' Alliance; National Identity Force Party; Independent Social Democratic Party
- Slogan: For the nation! (Romanian: Pentru națiune!)
- Senate: 1 / 136
- Chamber of Deputies: 4 / 330

Website
- aliantabsr.ro

Romanian Sovereigntist Bloc (Romanian: Blocul Suveranist Român) is a sovereigntist electoral alliance that was formed to compete in the 2024 Romanian elections.

== History ==
On 25 November 2023, several political parties announced the creation of the Romanian Sovereigntist Bloc, which includes Right Republican Party, Romanian Nationhood Party, Coalition for the Nation, Reformist Party, Homeland Party, Christian Social Popular Union Party. The Bloc proposes several revisions of the Constitution, the President of Romania's term shortened to 4 years and more powers transferred to the Parliament, to ban experimental medical treatments without the written consent of the patient, to protect the sexual identity of children, to ban the monitoring of citizens without the approval of the court and others, the prohibition of the occupation of public functions by former members of the intelligence services and their exclusively civil organization, and increasing Parliament's representativeness by imposing an electoral threshold of 1% (compared to the current 5%). These revisions to the Constitution are called by the bloc as the "Third Republic", claiming that the first republic was imposed by the Soviets, the second republic was imposed by Euro-Atlantic structures, the third will be that of the Romanian people. However, it claims to support Romania's membership in both the EU and NATO. The Bloc is also socially conservative, opposing same-sex marriage.

The Bloc's candidate for the 2024 Romanian presidential election is former minister of finance Eugen Teodorovici.

A November 2023 poll gave the Bloc 8% of the voting intention, while another one from January 2024 gave it 9%.
