= Dragoș Pîslaru =

Romanian politician

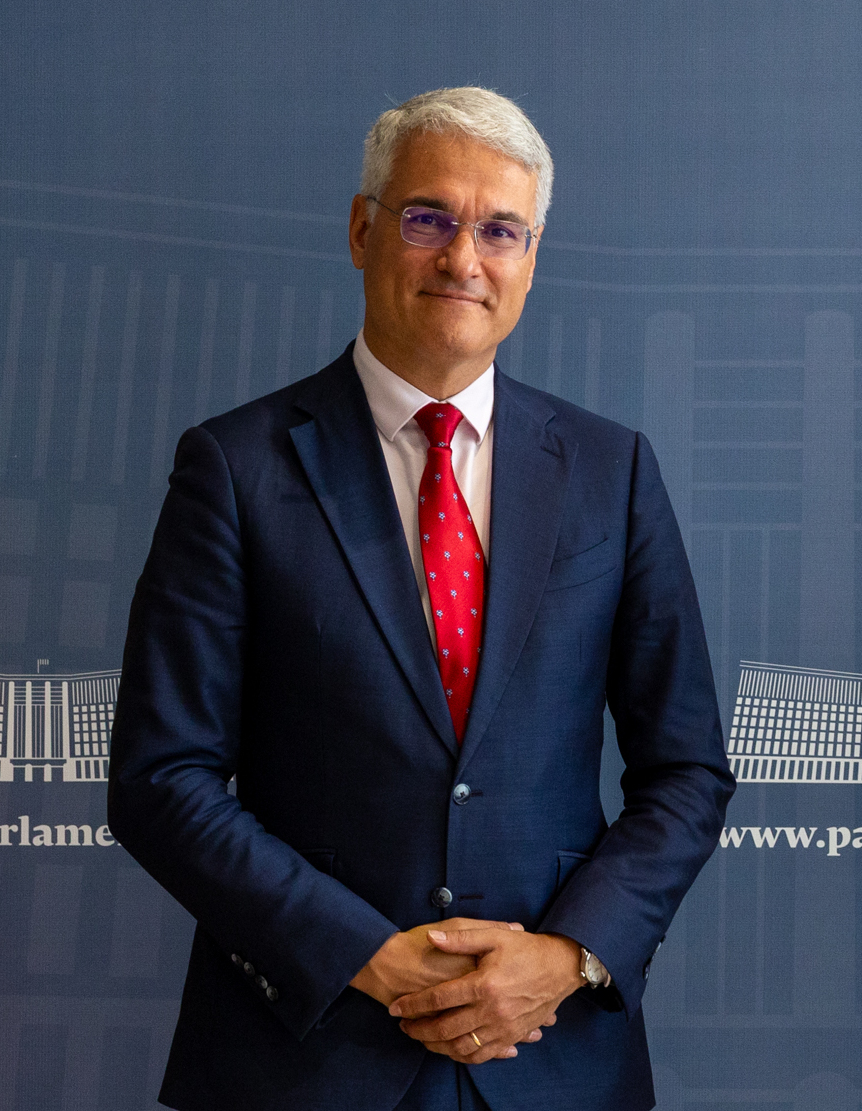
- Pîslaru in 2025

Minister of European Investments and Projects
- In office 23 June 2025 – 20 October 2026
- Prime Minister: Ilie Bolojan
- Preceded by: Marcel Boloș
- Succeeded by: Mihai Ghigiu

Minister of Labor, Family, Social Protection and Elderly
- In office 25 April 2026 – 20 October 2026
- Prime Minister: Ilie Bolojan
- Preceded by: Florin Manole
- Succeeded by: Florin Manole
- In office 18 April 2016 – 4 January 2017
- Prime Minister: Dacian Cioloș
- Preceded by: Claudia Costea
- Succeeded by: Lia Olguța Vasilescu

Member of the European Parliament for Romania
- In office 2 July 2019 – 15 July 2024

Personal details
- Born: 23 March 1976 (age 50) Bucharest, Romania
- Party: PNL (1998–2004, 2026–)
- Other political affiliations: Independent (2016–2018); PLUS (2018–2021); USR (2021–2022); REPER (2022–2026)

Dragoș Nicolae Pîslaru is a Romanian economist and politician of the National Liberal Party (PNL), who served as a Member of the European Parliament between 2019 and 2024. He was previously a member of PLUS and REPER. He also held the position of Minister of Labor, Family, Social Protection and the Elderly in the government of Prime Minister Dacian Cioloș from 18 April 2016, until 4 January 2017.

In June 2025, he became Minister of Investments and European Projects (Romanian: Ministrul Investițiilor și Proiectelor Europene) in the Bolojan cabinet on the nomination of the National Liberals.

== Early life and education ==
Pîslaru is a graduate of the Faculty of International Economic Relations within the Academy of Economic Studies in Bucharest (October 1994 – September 1998) with a bachelor's degree in International Economics. He attended postgraduate courses, obtaining a diploma of "In-depth Studies in European Integration" also within the ASE (October 1998 – September 1999).

Pîslaru holds a Master of Science - International Relations from the London School of Economics and Political Science in the United Kingdom (October 1999 – September 2000) and a Diploma of Entrepreneurship - Case Study Centered Learning at Harvard Business School (July 2006). He holds a doctorate in economic sciences with a thesis held at the National Institute of Economic Research, Academia Română (October 2013).

== Early career ==
Pîslaru taught economics at ASE Bucharest as a university lecturer, at the Faculty of International Economic Relations (November 1999 – September 2007). He was associate researcher at the Romanian Center for Economic Policies (December 2000 - November 2005) and executive director of the Applied Economics Group (June 2004 – December 2006).

Pîslaru held the position of administrator / general manager in the strategic consulting company, GEA Strategy & Consulting S.A. (December 2006 – November 2015). As a national analyst and expert, he has been involved in several projects on European policies, in particular regarding economic competitiveness, sustainable development and engines of growth.

== Member of the European Parliament ==
In the European Parliament, Pîslaru serves on the Committee on Labor and Social Affairs (EMPL) where he is the Coordinator of the Renew Europe Group, the Committee on Economic and Monetary Affairs (ECON), and on the Committee on Industry, Research and Energy (ITRE).

Pîslaru is the parliament's rapporteur on the Support Program for Reforms, with a budget of 25 billion euros. He is also part of the working group within the ECON Committee dedicated to joining the euro zone. He is a rapporteur for the Renew Europe group on the implementation of the Pan-European Personal Pension Product (PEPP), as well a rapporteur for the implementation of the European Fund for Strategic Investments.

Pîslaru is also a "shadow" rapporteur on two other files: the Invest EU program file, with a budget of 38 billion euros and the file on the coordination of social security systems at European level.

In addition to his committee assignments, Pîslaru is part of the delegation of the European Parliament for relations with Japan and a substitute for the delegation for relations with the United States of America. He is also a member of the MEPs Against Cancer group.

In 2024, Pîslaru was the winner of the "Youth Champion" award at The Parliament Magazine's annual MEP Awards.

== MEP local offices ==
As an MEP, Pîslaru opened local offices in Baia Mare, Oradea and Satu Mare. He announced that he will open two other local offices in Timișoara and Craiova.

== Other mentions ==
Member in:

- Competition Council Advisory Board;
- Romanian Society of Economy (SOREC);
- The TCI network (The Competitiveness Institute)
- Team Europe 2005-2008 - European Commission / Romania;
- Representative of the Alumni Association in Romania of the London School of Economics;
- Working Group for improving the SME and the business environment (under the patronage of the Ministry of Economy).

== Programs and projects ==
- "The impact of EURO adoption in the countries of Central and Eastern Europe. Case study - Romania "(November 1999 - February 2000)
- "Institutional reform and economic performance in Romania in the process of accession to the European Union" (nov. 2001-Jun. 2002)
- "Performance Evaluation of the Business Sector Policy (EPPA) 2004" (February - October 2004), "Technical Assistance for MA SOP CCE for the Intermediate Evaluation of SOP CCE" (2009–2010)
- "Ex-post evaluation of pre-accession assistance programs for the Cross-Border Cooperation Program in Romania and Bulgaria" (2010)
- "The Pact for Energy" (2013)
- "Elaboration of the national strategy in the field of research, technological development and innovation for the period 2014-2020" (Sector plan in the field of research and development in Industry) (2013)
- "Study evaluation of the access of SMEs to financing" (2012–2013)
- "Elaboration of the National Competitiveness Strategy 2014-2020" (2013).
