= Ramona Strugariu =

Romanian politician (born 1979)

Ramona Strugariu MEP
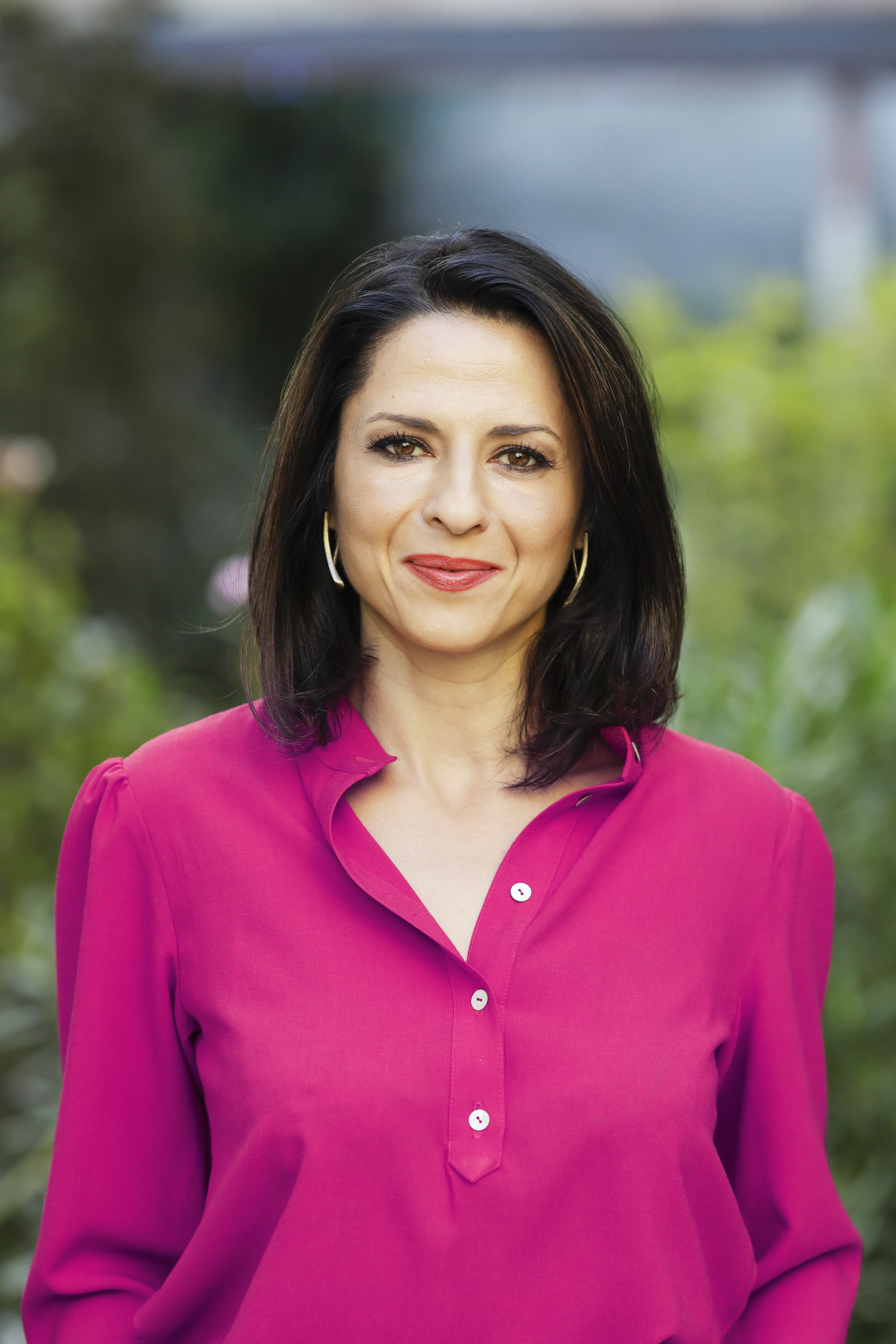

Member of the European Parliament for Romania
- Incumbent
- Assumed office 2019

Personal details
- Born: 6 August 1979 (age 47) Bârlad, Vaslui County, Romania
- Party: REPER/Renewing Romania's European Project
- Education: Alexandru Ioan Cuza University

Ramona Strugariu (born 6 August 1979) is a Romanian politician of REPER and previous member of USR PLUS/USR who has served as a Member of the European Parliament since 2019.

== Political career ==
In parliament, Strugariu has been serving on the Committee on Civil Liberties, Justice and Home Affairs. In this capacity, she has been serving as rapporteur on the European Media Freedom Act since 2023.

In addition to her committee assignments, Strugariu is part of the parliament's delegation to the Euronest Parliamentary Assembly. She is also a member of the European Parliament Intergroup on Anti-Corruption; the European Parliament Intergroup on LGBT Rights; and the MEPs Against Cancer group.

== Political positions ==
In 2021, Strugariu joined seven other Romanian MEPs in co-signing a letter to Ursula von der Leyen and Maroš Šefčovič in which they call on the European Commission to stop the United Kingdom from holding EU nationals in immigration removal centers.
