= Elena Cuza National College (Craiova) =

High school in Craiova, Romania

Coordinates: 44.3199°N 23.7928°E

Elena Cuza National College (Romanian: Colegiul Național Elena Cuza) is a high school located at 12 Mihai Viteazul Sreeet, Craiova, Romania, teaching mainly foreign languages. Until 1944 and between 1970 and 1975, all classes were held in French.

== History ==
The school was founded in 1833 under the name of "Pensionatul de fete Lazaro-Otetelișanu" as a school for girls, belonging to Lazaro-Otetelișanu, the first of its kind in Wallachia. It was meant to help educate the girls of Boyar families. The initiative belonged to Iordache Otetelișanu but most of the money came from Constantin Lazaro, who gives the school the houses he inherited form his wife, Zoița Pârșcoveanca. All the girls who were accepted in the school had to know to read and write in a foreign language.

In 1860, the school was nationalized.

In 1925, the Minister for National Education, Dr. Constantin Angelescu, considered to be a joint founder of the Elena Cuza Girls' High School, decided "to put an end to the state of ruin in which the school was located, replacing it with a new, modern one, which corresponds to the requirements of the time".

Beginning on 1 September 1928, "Elena Cuza" Girls' Boarding Secondary School, Grade II, received the name "Elena Cuza" Girls' High School, based on the Secondary Education Law of the same year.

Starting 1959 it was renamed "Școala medie nr. 3".

Between 1966 and 1976, the school changes name again and is called "Liceul nr. 3" for the first time accepting boys.

Between 1977 and 1989 it was called "Liceul de Filologie-Istorie" and then "Liceul Elena Cuza". In 1998, the school was again called "Colegiul Național Elena Cuza".
