= 2019 Romanian Presidency of the Council of the European Union =

First Romanian presidency of the Council of the European Union

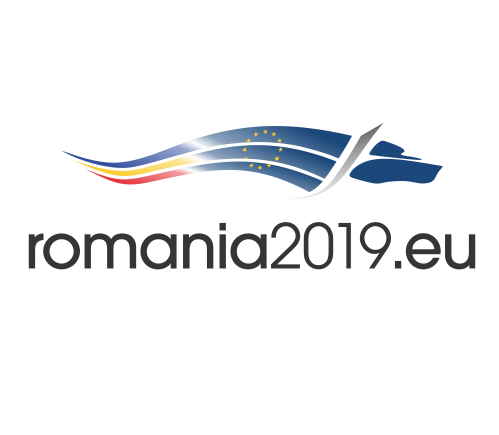
- Logo of the 2019 Romanian Presidency of the Council of the European Union; 1 January – 30 June 2019
- Council of the European Union
- Website: romania2019.eu

Presidency trio
- Romania; Finland; Croatia

The 2019 Romanian Presidency of the Council of the European Union was Romania's first Presidency of the Council of the European Union. It lasted from 1 January to 30 June 2019.

Romania started preparations for taking over the presidency of the Council of the European Union in 2017, organising several meetings of the Presidency Trio (composed of Romania, Finland and Croatia) and appointing and training numerous additional staff to ensure an appropriate chairing of the office. The Romanian presidency took measures in various areas such as economy, employment, energy, environmental protection, finance, justice, home affairs and social affairs. A notable milestone was the adoption of carbon dioxide (CO_{2}) reduction targets for heavy-duty vehicles within the whole European Union, more precisely a 30% reduction by 2030.

On 9 May, during Europe Day, an informal summit in the Romanian city of Sibiu with the participation of the heads of state of all 27 EU member states and several other relevant European politicians took place. The priorities of the EU in the coming years were discussed and the so-called Sibiu Declaration was adopted. The summit also saw several bilateral meetings between various European leaders and politicians, as well as the meeting between Chancellor of Germany Angela Merkel and representatives of the Democratic Forum of Germans in Romania. The European heads of state received a warm welcome by the inhabitants of the city. The summit was praised afterwards by several European political figures.

Donald Tusk, President of the European Council, congratulated the Romanian presidency, calling it "an energetic and successful presidency" with an "impressive" management. The Romanian presidency was succeeded by the 2019 Finnish one.
