= Răzvan Popa (politician) =

Romanian politician

Răzvan Popa (Note: Romanian pronunciation: [rəzˈvan ˈpopa]) (born 1978) is a Romanian politician.

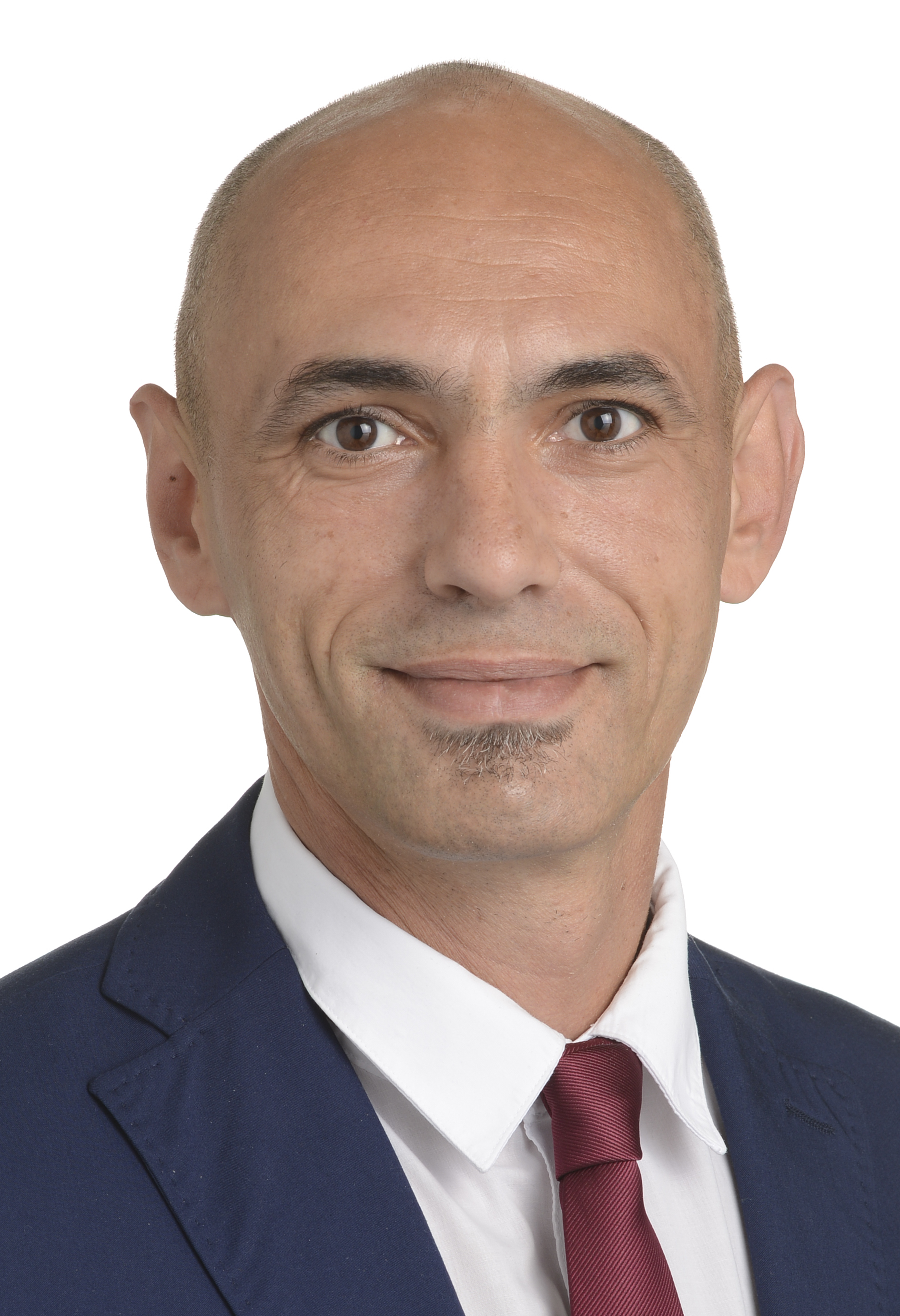

A member of the Social Democratic Party, Popa served on the Brașov city council until April 2017, when he resigned. He ran to become the city's mayor in 2016, but lost. In September 2017, following the resignation from the European Parliament of Victor Negrescu in order to join the cabinet of Mihai Tudose, Popa succeeded him to become a Member of the European Parliament.
