= Ministry of Labor and Social Protection (Romania) =

Government ministry of Romania

Ministry of Labour, Family, Youth and Social Solidarity
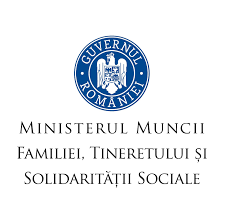
- Logo of the Ministry
- Incumbent; Florin Manole since 25 November 2021
- Website: www.mmuncii.gov.ro

The Ministry of Labour, Family, Youth and Social Solidarity of Romania (Romanian: Ministerul Familiei, Tineretului și Solidarității Sociale) is one of the eighteen ministries of the Government of Romania.

== Institutions ==
The following institutions are under the authority of the Ministry of Labour and Social Protection:

- National House of Public Pensions (Casa Națională de Pensii Publice) www.cnpp.ro
- National Agency for Employment (Agenția Națională pentru Ocuparea Forței de Muncă) www.anofm.ro

The following institutions are subordinated to the Ministry of Labour and Social Protection:

- The National Authority for Disabled Persons (Autoritatea Națională pentru Persoanele cu Handicap)
- The National Authority for the Protection of the Rights of the Child and Adoption (Autoritatea Națională pentru Protecția Drepturilor Copilului și Adopție) www.copii.ro
- National Agency for Payment and Social Inspection (Agenția Națională pentru Plăți și Inspecție Socială)
- National Agency for Equal Opportunities for Women and Men (Agenția Națională pentru Egalitatea de Șanse între Femei și Bărbați) www.anes.ro
- Labour Inspection (Inspecția Muncii), including the Territorial Labour Inspectorates (Inspectoratele Teritoriale de Muncă) www.inspectmun.ro

== See also ==
- Ministry of Labor, Family, and Social Protection (Moldova)
