= List of members of the Chamber of Deputies of Romania (2020–2024) =

This is a list of members of the Chamber of Deputies of Romania, elected following the 2020 Romanian legislative election.

| Number | Name | Constituency | Party | Note |
|---|---|---|---|---|
| 1 | Corneliu Olar | Alba | PNL | |
| 2 | Florin-Claudiu Roman | Alba | PNL | |
| 3 | Daniel-Gheorghe Rusu | Alba | AUR | |
| 4 | Beniamin Todosiu | Alba | USR | |
| 5 | Radu-Marcel Tuhuț | Alba | PSD | |
| 6 | Adrian Alda | Arad | PSD | |
| 7 | Ovidiu-Sergiu Bîlcea | Arad | PNL | |
| 8 | Péter Faragó | Arad | UDMR | |
| 9 | Mihai-Viorel Fifor | Arad | PSD | |
| 10 | Vasile Nagy | Arad | AUR | |
| 11 | Glad-Aurel Varga | Arad | PNL | |
| 12 | Adrian Wiener | Arad | USR | |
| 13 | Aurel Bălășoiu | Argeș | PSD | |
| 14 | Simona Bucura-Oprescu | Argeș | PSD | |
| 15 | Mircia Chelaru | Argeș | AUR | |
| 16 | Daniel Constantin | Argeș | PNL | |
| 17 | Nicolae Georgescu | Argeș | PSD | |
| 18 | Remus-Gabriel Mihalcea | Argeș | PSD | |
| 19 | Gheorghe Adrian Miuțescu | Argeș | PNL | |
| 20 | Liviu-Ionuț Moșteanu | Argeș | USR | |
| 21 | Nicolae Pavelescu | Argeș | PSD | |
| 22 | Antonio Andrușceac | Bacău | AUR | |
| 23 | Ana-Maria Cătăuță | Bacău | PSD | |
| 24 | Cătălina Ciofu | Bacău | PNL | |
| 25 | Costel Neculai Dunava | Bacău | PSD | |
| 26 | Mircea Fechet | Bacău | PNL | |
| 27 | Ionel Floroiu | Bacău | PSD | |
| 28 | Elena Hărătău | Bacău | PNL | |
| 29 | Cristian-Paul Ichim | Bacău | PLUS | |
| 30 | Claudiu-Augustin Ilișanu | Bacău | PSD | |
| 31 | Teodor Lazăr | Bacău | USR | |
| 32 | Rozália-Ibolya Biró | Bihor | UDMR | |
| 33 | Steluța-Gustica Cătăniciu | Bihor | PSD | |
| 34 | Vasile-Aurel Căuș | Bihor | PNL | |
| 35 | Ioan Cupșa | Bihor | PNL | |
| 36 | Silviu Dehelean | Bihor | USR | |
| 37 | János Kiss | Bihor | PNL | |
| 38 | Mihai Ioan Lasca | Bihor | AUR | Until February 2021 |
| 39 | Ioan Mang | Bihor | PSD | |
| 40 | Ödön Szabó | Bihor | UDMR | |
| 41 | Bogdan-Gruia Ivan | Bistrița-Năsăud | PSD | |
| 42 | Olivia-Diana Morar | Bistrița-Năsăud | PNL | |
| 43 | Lóránt-Zoltán Sas | Bistrița-Năsăud | PLUS | |
| 44 | Robert-Ionatan Sighiartău | Bistrița-Năsăud | PNL | |
| 45 | Vasile-Daniel Suciu | Bistrița-Năsăud | PSD | |
| 46 | Marius-Constantin Budăi | Botoșani | PSD | |
| 47 | Andrei-Iulian Drancă | Botoșani | USR | |
| 48 | Lucian Feodorov | Botoșani | AUR | |
| 49/1 | Constantin-Neculai Pătrăuceanu | Botoșani | PSD | until 1 February 2021 |
| 49/2 | Alexandra Huțu | Botoșani | PSD | as of 1 February 2021 |
| 50 | Dan-Constantin Șlincu | Botoșani | PSD | |
| 51 | Costel Șoptică | Botoșani | PNL | |
| 52 | Gabriel Andronache | Brașov | PNL | |
| 53 | Ionuț-Sorin Banciu | Brașov | PNL | |
| 54 | Tudor-Vlad Benga | Brașov | USR | |
| 55 | Dumitru Flucuș | Brașov | PNL | |
| 56 | Victor Ilie | Brașov | USR | |
| 57 | Marius-Andrei Miftode | Brașov | USR | |
| 58 | Ana-Loredana Predescu | Brașov | PSD | |
| 59 | Marian-Iulian Rasaliu | Brașov | PSD | |
| 60 | Francisc Tobă | Brașov | Independent | |
| 61 | Ciprian Ciubuc | Brăila | AUR | |
| 62 | Florin Mircea | Brăila | PSD | |
| 63 | Nicu Niță | Brăila | PSD | |
| 64 | George-Adrian Paladi | Brăila | PSD | |
| 65 | Alexandru Popa | Brăila | PNL | |
| 66 | Gabriel-Ioan Avrămescu | Buzău | PNL | |
| 67 | Ion-Marcel Ciolacu | Buzău | PSD | |
| 68 | Andi-Lucian Cristea | Buzău | PSD | |
| 69 | Romeo-Daniel Lungu | Buzău | PSD | |
| 70 | Nicolae Roman | Buzău | AUR | |
| 71 | Laurențiu-Cristinel Țepeluș | Buzău | PSD | |
| 72 | Emanuel-Dumitru Ungureanu | Buzău | USR | |
| 73 | Romulus-Marius Damian | Caraș-Severin | PSD | |
| 74 | Florin-Silviu Hurduzeu | Caraș-Severin | PSD | |
| 75 | Attila Kelemen | Caraș-Severin | UDMR | |
| 76 | Jaro Norbert Marșalic | Caraș-Severin | PNL | |
| 77 | Dumitru Rujan | Caraș-Severin | PNL | |
| 78 | Călin-Constantin Balabașciuc | Călărași | AUR | |
| 79 | Constantin Bîrcă | Călărași | PSD | |
| 80 | Dumitru Coarnă | Călărași | PSD | |
| 81 | Florian-Emil Dumitru | Călărași | PNL | |
| 82 | Patriciu-Andrei Achimaș-Cadariu | Cluj | PSD | |
| 83 | Viorel Băltărețu | Cluj | PLUS | |
| 84 | Cristina Burciu | Cluj | PNL | |
| 85 | Ilie-Alin Coleșa | Cluj | AUR | |
| 86 | Botond Csoma | Cluj | UDMR | |
| 87 | Radu-Marin Moisin | Cluj | PNL | |
| 88 | Sorin-Dan Moldovan | Cluj | PNL | |
| 89 | Radu-Iulian Molnar | Cluj | USR | |
| 90 | Oana Murariu | Cluj | PLUS | |
| 91 | Ioan-Sabin Sărmaș | Cluj | PNL | |
| 92 | Dănuț Aelenei | Constanța | AUR | |
| 93 | Mircea-Marius Banias | Constanța | PNL | |
| 94 | Bogdan-Alexandru Bola | Constanța | PNL | |
| 95 | Marian Crușoveanu | Constanța | PNL | |
| 96 | Ileana Cristina Dumitrache | Constanța | PSD | |
| 97 | Dumitru-Viorel Focșa | Constanța | AUR | |
| 98 | Bogdan-Iulian Huțucă | Constanța | PNL | |
| 99 | Stelian-Cristian Ion | Constanța | USR | |
| 100 | Dumitru-Lucian Lungoci | Constanța | PSD | |
| 101 | Cristina Camelia Rizea | Constanța | PLUS | |
| 102 | Marius Horia Țuțuianu | Constanța | PSD | |
| 103 | Zakariás Benedek | Covasna | UDMR | |
| 104 | Károly Gál | Covasna | UDMR | |
| 105 | Csaba Könczei | Covasna | UDMR | |
| 106 | Zoltán Miklós | Covasna | UDMR | |
| 107 | Liviu-Ioan Balint | Dâmbovița | PNL | |
| 108 | Daniel-Codruț Blaga | Dâmbovița | PLUS | |
| 109 | Georgeta-Carmen Holban | Dâmbovița | PSD | |
| 110 | Gabriel Plăiașu | Dâmbovița | PNL | |
| 111 | Radu Mihai Popa | Dâmbovița | PSD | |
| 112 | Marian Țachianu | Dâmbovița | PSD | |
| 113 | Ioan Vulpescu | Dâmbovița | PSD | |
| 114 | Iulian-Alexandru Badea | Dolj | PSD | |
| 115 | Ringo Dămureanu | Dolj | AUR | |
| 116 | Daniel-Sorin Gheba | Dolj | USR | |
| 117 | Nicolae Giugea | Dolj | PNL | |
| 118 | Eliza-Mădălina Peța-Ștefănescu | Dolj | PSD | |
| 119 | Alexandra Presură | Dolj | PSD | |
| 120 | Ștefan-Bucur Stoica | Dolj | PNL | |
| 121 | Ionuț-Marian Stroe | Dolj | PNL | |
| 122 | Alina-Elena Tănăsescu | Dolj | PSD | |
| 123 | Laura-Cătălina Vicol-Ciorbă | Dolj | PSD | |
| 124 | Onuț Valeriu Atanasiu | Galați | PNL | |
| 125 | Laurențiu-Viorel Gîdei | Galați | PSD | |
| 126 | Mitică-Marius Mărgărit | Galați | PSD | |
| 127 | Sorin-Titus Muncaciu | Galați | AUR | |
| 128 | Aurel Nechita | Galați | PSD | |
| 129 | Bogdan-Ionel Rodeanu | Galați | USR | |
| 130 | Viorica Sandu | Galați | PSD | |
| 131 | Lilian Scripnic | Galați | AUR | |
| 132 | George-Cătălin Stângă | Galați | PNL | |
| 133 | Alexandru-Ioan Andrei | Giurgiu | PNL | |
| 134 | Cristina-Elena Dinu | Giurgiu | PSD | |
| 135 | Maria-Gabriela Horga | Giurgiu | PNL | |
| 136 | Marian Mina | Giurgiu | PSD | |
| 137 | Claudiu Manta | Gorj | PSD | |
| 138 | Radu-Dinel Miruță | Gorj | USR | |
| 139 | Gheorghe Pecingină | Gorj | PNL | |
| 140 | Dan Vîlceanu | Gorj | PNL | |
| 141 | Mihai Weber | Gorj | PSD | |
| 142 | Sándor Bende | Harghita | UDMR | |
| 143 | Gábor Hajdu | Harghita | UDMR | |
| 144 | Hunor Kelemen | Harghita | UDMR | |
| 145 | László-Zsolt Ladányi | Harghita | UDMR | |
| 146 | Zoltán Zakariás | Harghita | UDMR | |
| 147 | Anamaria Gavrilă | Hunedoara | AUR | |
| 148 | Pollyanna-Hanellore Hangan | Hunedoara | USR | |
| 149 | Natalia-Elena Intotero | Hunedoara | PSD | |
| 150 | Viorel Sălan | Hunedoara | PSD | |
| 151 | Vetuța Stănescu | Hunedoara | PNL | |
| 152 | Ilie Toma | Hunedoara | PSD | |
| 153 | Rodica-Luminița Barcari | Ialomița | PNL | |
| 154 | Raluca Giorgiana Dumitrescu | Ialomița | PSD | |
| 155 | Ștefan Mușoiu | Ialomița | PSD | |
| 156 | Silviu-Titus Păunescu | Ialomița | AUR | |
| 157 | Mihail Albișteanu | Iași | AUR | |
| 158 | Monica-Elena Berescu | Iași | PLUS | |
| 159 | Cosette-Paula Chichirău | Iași | USR | |
| 160 | Vasile Cîtea | Iași | PSD | |
| 161 | Filip Havârneanu | Iași | USR | |
| 162 | Cristian-Daniel Ivănuță | Iași | AUR | |
| 163 | Alexandru Kocsis-Cristea | Iași | PNL | |
| 164 | Silviu Nicu Macovei | Iași | PSD | |
| 165 | Iulian-Alexandru Muraru | Iași | PNL | |
| 166 | Sorin Năcuță | Iași | PNL | |
| 167 | Marius-Eugen Ostaficiuc | Iași | PSD | |
| 168 | Vasilică Toma | Iași | PSD | |
| 169 | Oana-Alexandra Cambera | Ilfov | PLUS | |
| 170 | Andrei Daniel Gheorghe | Ilfov | PNL | |
| 171 | Daniel-Florin Ghiță | Ilfov | PSD | |
| 172 | Gianina Șerban | Ilfov | AUR | |
| 173 | George-Cristian Tuță | Ilfov | PNL | |
| 174 | Florin-Alexandru Alexe | Maramureș | PNL | |
| 175 | Norbert Apjok | Maramureș | UDMR | |
| 176 | Călin-Ioan Bota | Maramureș | PNL | |
| 177 | Brian Cristian | Maramureș | PLUS | |
| 178 | Darius Pop | Maramureș | AUR | |
| 179 | Gheorghe Șimon | Maramureș | PSD | |
| 180 | Gabriel-Valer Zetea | Maramureș | PSD | |
| 181 | Virgil Alin Chirilă | Mehedinți | PSD | |
| 182 | Cornel-Vasile Folescu | Mehedinți | PSD | |
| 183 | Dumitru Mărculescu | Mehedinți | PNL | |
| 184 | Virgil-Daniel Popescu | Mehedinți | PNL | |
| 185 | Corneliu-Florin Buicu | Mureș | PSD | |
| 186 | Éva-Andrea Csép | Mureș | UDMR | |
| 187 | Adrian Giurgiu | Mureș | USR | |
| 188 | Dumitrița Gliga | Mureș | PSD | |
| 189 | Anquetil-Károly Kolcsár | Mureș | UDMR | |
| 190 | József-György Kulcsár-Terza | Mureș | UDMR | |
| 191 | Ervin Molnar | Mureș | PNL | |
| 192 | Dan Tanasă | Mureș | AUR | |
| 193 | Iulian Bulai | Neamț | USR | |
| 194 | Oana-Gianina Bulai | Neamț | PSD | |
| 195 | Mara-Daniela Calista | Neamț | PNL | |
| 196 | Corneliu-Mugurel Cozmanciuc | Neamț | PNL | |
| 197 | Laurențiu-Dan Leoreanu | Neamț | PNL | |
| 198 | Dumitrina Mitrea | Neamț | AUR | |
| 199 | Remus Munteanu | Neamț | PSD | |
| 200 | Ciprian-Constantin Șerban | Neamț | PSD | |
| 201 | Emil-Florin Albotă | Olt | PSD | |
| 202 | Florin-Ionuț Barbu | Olt | PSD | |
| 203 | Adrian-Ionuț Chesnoiu | Olt | PSD | |
| 204 | Ion-Cătălin Grecu | Olt | PSD | |
| 205 | Marius-Ionel Iancu | Olt | PSD | |
| 206 | Gigel-Sorinel Știrbu | Olt | PNL | |
| 207 | Adrian-George Axinia | Prahova | AUR | |
| 208 | Grațiela-Leocadia Gavrilescu | Prahova | PSD | |
| 209 | George Ionescu | Prahova | PNL | |
| 210 | Andrei-Răzvan Lupu | Prahova | PLUS | |
| 211 | Rodica Paraschiv | Prahova | PSD | |
| 212 | Mihai-Laurențiu Polițeanu | Prahova | USR | |
| 213 | Marian-Cătălin Predoiu | Prahova | PNL | |
| 214 | Răzvan Sorin Prișcă | Prahova | PNL | |
| 215 | Mircea Roșca | Prahova | PNL | |
| 216 | Simona-Maya Teodoroiu | Prahova | PSD | |
| 217 | Bogdan-Andrei Toader | Prahova | PSD | |
| 218 | Adrian-Felician Cozma | Satu Mare | PNL | |
| 219 | Radu-Mihai Cristescu | Satu Mare | PSD | |
| 220 | Loránd-Bálint Magyar | Satu Mare | UDMR | |
| 221 | Szabolcs Nagy | Satu Mare | UDMR | |
| 222 | Radu Panait | Satu Mare | USR | |
| 223 | Lucian Nicolae Bode | Sălaj | PNL | |
| 224 | Florian-Claudiu Neaga | Sălaj | PSD | |
| 225 | Alin-Costel Prunean | Sălaj | PLUS | |
| 226 | Dénes Seres | Sălaj | UDMR | |
| 227 | Ilie Dan Barna | Sibiu | USR | |
| 228 | Sebastian-Ilie Suciu | Sibiu | AUR | |
| 229 | Constantin Șovăială | Sibiu | PNL | |
| 230 | Christine Thellmann | Sibiu | PNL | |
| 231 | Bogdan Gheorghe Trif | Sibiu | PSD | |
| 232 | Raluca Turcan | Sibiu | PNL | |
| 233 | Dorel-Gheorghe Acatrinei | Suceava | AUR | |
| 234 | Mirela Elena Adomnicăi | Suceava | PSD | |
| 235 | Ioan Balan | Suceava | PNL | |
| 236 | Eugen Bejinariu | Suceava | PSD | |
| 237 | Radu Tudor Ciornei | Suceava | USR | |
| 238 | Angelica Fădor | Suceava | PNL | |
| 239 | Bogdan Gheorghiu | Suceava | PNL | |
| 240 | Vlad Popescu | Suceava | PSD | |
| 241 | Lucian-Florin Pușcașu | Suceava | AUR | |
| 242 | Gheorghe Șoldan | Suceava | PSD | |
| 243 | Costel Barbu | Teleorman | PNL | |
| 244 | Florică Ică Calotă | Teleorman | PNL | |
| 245 | Florin Piper-Savu | Teleorman | PSD | |
| 246 | Paul Stancu | Teleorman | PSD | |
| 247 | Maria Stoian | Teleorman | PNL | |
| 248 | Ben-Oni Ardelean | Timiș | PNL | |
| 249 | Claudiu-Martin Chira | Timiș | PNL | |
| 250 | Cătălin Drulă | Timiș | USR | |
| 251 | Nicu Fălcoi | Timiș | USR | |
| 252 | Sorin Mihai Grindeanu | Timiș | PSD | |
| 253 | Marilen-Gabriel Pirtea | Timiș | PNL | |
| 254 | Alfred-Robert Simonis | Timiș | PSD | |
| 255 | Ciprian-Titi Stoica | Timiș | AUR | |
| 256 | Cosmin Șandru | Timiș | PNL | |
| 257 | Daniel-Liviu Toda | Timiș | PLUS | |
| 258 | Mirela Furtună | Tulcea | PSD | |
| 259 | Michael Gudu | Tulcea | PNL | |
| 260 | George Șișcu | Tulcea | PNL | |
| 261 | Eugen Terente | Tulcea | USR | |
| 262 | Mihai-Cătălin Botez | Vaslui | USR | |
| 263 | Raisa Enachi | Vaslui | AUR | |
| 264 | Tudor Polak | Vaslui | PNL | |
| 265 | Eduard-Andrei Popica | Vaslui | PSD | |
| 266 | Adrian Solomon | Vaslui | PSD | |
| 267 | Irinel Ioan Stativă | Vaslui | PSD | |
| 268 | Nelu Tătaru | Vaslui | PNL | |
| 269 | Cristian Buican | Vâlcea | PNL | |
| 270 | Laurențiu-Nicolae Cazan | Vâlcea | PNL | |
| 271 | Ion-Marian Lazăr | Vâlcea | USR | |
| 272 | Eugen Neață | Vâlcea | PSD | |
| 273 | Daniela Oteșanu | Vâlcea | PSD | |
| 274 | Ștefan-Ovidiu Popa | Vâlcea | PSD | |
| 275 | Georgel Badiu | Vrancea | AUR | |
| 276 | Ionel Dancă | Vrancea | PNL | |
| 277 | Nicușor Halici | Vrancea | PSD | |
| 278 | Elena Stoica | Vrancea | PSD | |
| 279 | Ion Ștefan | Vrancea | PNL | |
| 280 | Victoria-Violeta Alexandru | Bucharest | PNL | |
| 281 | Alin-Gabriel Apostol | Bucharest | USR | |
| 282 | Mihai-Alexandru Badea | Bucharest | USR | |
| 283 | Cristian-Tudor Băcanu | Bucharest | PNL | |
| 284 | Sebastian Ioan Burduja | Bucharest | PNL | |
| 285 | Diana-Anda Buzoianu | Bucharest | PLUS | |
| 286 | Daniel Florea | Bucharest | PSD | |
| 287 | Oana-Consuela Florea | Bucharest | PSD | |
| 288 | Nicoleta-Matilda Goleac | Bucharest | PSD | |
| 289 | Carmen-Ileana Mihălcescu | Bucharest | PSD | |
| 290 | Rodica Nassar | Bucharest | PSD | |
| 291 | Claudiu-Iulius-Gavril Năsui | Bucharest | USR | |
| 292 | Denisa-Elena Neagu | Bucharest | USR | |
| 293 | Ludovic Orban | Bucharest | PNL | |
| 294 | Oana-Marciana Özmen | Bucharest | USR | |
| 295 | Rareș-Tudor Pop | Bucharest | USR | |
| 296 | Dan-Cristian Popescu | Bucharest | PSD | |
| 297 | Pavel Popescu | Bucharest | PNL | |
| 298 | Cristina-Mădălina Prună | Bucharest | USR | |
| 299 | Alexandru Rafila | Bucharest | PSD | |
| 300 | Cristian-Gabriel Seidler | Bucharest | USR | |
| 301 | George Nicolae Simion | Bucharest | AUR | |
| 302 | Diana Stoica | Bucharest | PLUS | |
| 303 | Antonel Tănase | Bucharest | PNL | |
| 304 | Dragoș-Cătălin Teniță | Bucharest | PLUS | |
| 305 | Cristina Trăilă | Bucharest | PNL | |
| 306 | Daniel Tudorache | Bucharest | PSD | |
| 307 | Adriana-Diana Tușa | Bucharest | PSD | |
| 308 | Oana-Silvia Țoiu | Bucharest | PLUS | |
| 309 | Varol Amet | Nationwide | National minorities | |
| 310 | Ognean Crîstici | Nationwide | National minorities | |
| 311 | Silviu Feodor | Nationwide | National minorities | |
| 312 | Iulius Marian Firczak | Nationwide | National minorities | |
| 313 | Ovidiu-Victor Ganț | Nationwide | National minorities | |
| 314 | Giureci-Slobodan Ghera | Nationwide | National minorities | |
| 315 | Andi-Gabriel Grosaru | Nationwide | National minorities | |
| 316 | Iusein Ibram | Nationwide | National minorities | |
| 317 | Ghervazen Longher | Nationwide | National minorities | |
| 318 | Cătălin-Zamfir Manea | Nationwide | National minorities | |
| 319 | Adrian-Miroslav Merka | Nationwide | National minorities | |
| 320 | Gheorghe Nacov | Nationwide | National minorities | |
| 321 | Varujan Pambuccian | Nationwide | National minorities | |
| 322 | Nicolae-Miroslav Petrețchi | Nationwide | National minorities | |
| 323 | Ionel Stancu | Nationwide | National minorities | |
| 324 | Bogdan-Alin Stoica | Nationwide | National minorities | |
| 325 | Silviu Vexler | Nationwide | National minorities | |
| 326 | Dragoș-Gabriel Zisopol | Nationwide | National minorities | |
| 327 | Valentin-Ilie Făgărășian | Abroad | PNL | |
| 328 | Ștefan-Iulian Lőrincz | Abroad | USR | |
| 329 | Simina-Geanina-Daniela Tulbure | Abroad | PLUS | |
| 330 | Boris Volosatîi | Abroad | AUR | |
