= List of members of the Chamber of Deputies of Romania (2016–2020) =

This is a list of members of the Chamber of Deputies of Romania, elected following the 2016 legislative election.

Deputy	Party	Constituency
Florin Claudiu Roman	PNL	Alba
Olar Corneliu Răcuci	PNL	Alba
Claudiu Vasile	PNL	Alba
Sorin Bumb	PNL	Alba
Ioan Dîrzu	PSD	Alba
Varga Glad-Aurel	PNL	Arad
Pistru-Popa Eusebiu-Manea	PNL	Arad
Dorel-Gheorghe Căprar	PSD	Arad
Florin-Dan Tripa	PSD	Arad
Adrian Tudor	PSD	Arad
Faragó Péter	UDMR	Arad
Sergiu Cosmin Vlad	USR	Arad
Gerea Andrei-Dominic	ALDE	Argeș
Bica Dănuț	PNL	Argeș
Radu-Costin Vasilică	PSD	Argeș
Mircea-Gheorghe Drăghici	PSD	Argeș
Simona Bucura-Oprescu	PSD	Argeș
Nicolae Georgescu	PSD	Argeș
Cătălin-Marian Rădulescu	PSD	Argeș
Nicolae Velcea	PSD	Argeș
Liviu Ionuț Moșteanu	USR	Argeș
Avram Constantin	ALDE	Bacău
Palăr Ionel	PNL	Bacău
Lungu Tudorița	PNL	Bacău
Petru-Gabriel Vlase	PSD	Bacău
Theodora Șotcan	PSD	Bacău
Ionel Floroiu	PSD	Bacău
Lucian Șova	PSD	Bacău
Claudiu-Augustin Ilișanu	PSD	Bacău
Costel Neculai Dunava	PSD	Bacău
Lucian Daniel Stanciu	USR	Bacău
Ghilea Gavrilă	PNL	Bihor
Chereches Florica	PNL	Bihor
Cupsa Ioan	PNL	Bihor
Gheorghe-Dănuț Bogdan	PSD	Bihor
Marina-Adelina Coste	PSD	Bihor
Ioan-Sorin Roman	PSD	Bihor
Biro Rozalia	UDMR	Bihor
Szabo Odon	UDMR	Bihor
Silviu Dehelean	USR	Bihor
Ionuț Simionca	PMP	Bistrița-Năsăud
Sighiartău Robert Ionatan	PNL	Bistrița-Năsăud
Adriana Doina Pană	PSD	Bistrița-Năsăud
Vasile Daniel Suciu	PSD	Bistrița-Năsăud
Cristina-Ionela Iurișniți	USR	Bistrița-Năsăud
Achiței Vasile Cristian	PNL	Botoșani
Tamara-Dorina Ciofu	PSD	Botoșani
Mihaela Huncă	PSD	Botoșani
Marius Constantin Budăi	PSD	Botoșani
Răzvan-Ilie Rotaru	PSD	Botoșani
Costel Lupașcu	PSD	Botoșani
Ioniță Antoneta	PNL	Brăila
Varga Vasile	PNL	Brăila
Mihai Tudose	PSD	Brăila
Nicu Niță	PSD	Brăila
Marilena Emilia Meiroșu	PSD	Brăila
Borza Remus-Adrian	ALDE	Brașov
Mara Mareș	PNL	Brașov
Andronache Gabriel	PNL	Brașov
Mihai Valentin Popa	PSD	Brașov
Viorel Chiriac	PSD	Brașov
Roxana Mînzatu	PSD	Brașov
Mihai Mohaci	PSD	Brașov
Izabell-Agnes Ambrus	UDMR	Brașov
Tudor Benga	USR	Brașov
Constantin Daniel	ALDE	București
Florea Damian	ALDE	București
Cimpeanu Sorin Mihai	ALDE	București
Anton Anton	ALDE	București
Valeriu Steriu	PMP	București
Eugen Tomac	PMP	București
Adriana Săftoiu	PNL	București
Eugen Nicolăescu	PNL	București
Ovidiu Raețchi	PNL	București
Gabriel Petrea	PSD	București
Carmen-Ileana Moldovan	PSD	București
Georgian Pop	PSD	București
Oana-Consuela Florea	PSD	București
Mihăiță Vîrză	PSD	București
Adriana-Diana Tușa	PSD	București
Dumitru Chiriță	PSD	București
Beatrice Tudor	PSD	București
Liviu Ioan Adrian Pleșoianu	PSD	București
Mirela Furtună	PSD	București
Petre-Florin Manole	PSD	București
Aida-Cristina Căruceru	PSD	București
Nicușor Dan	USR	București
Cristian Ghinea	USR	București
Cristian Gabriel Seidler	USR	București
Oana Bîzgan	USR	București
Matei Adrian Dobrovie	USR	București
Claudiu Iulius Gavril Năsui	USR	București
Cristina Mădălina Prună	USR	București
Tudor Rareș Pop	USR	București
Adrian Mocanu	PMP	Buzău
Romanescu Cristinel	PNL	Buzău
Ion Marcel Ciolacu	PSD	Buzău
Sorin Lazăr	PSD	Buzău
Ionela Viorela Dobrică	PSD	Buzău
Nicolae Sebastian Valentin Radu	PSD	Buzău
Dănuț Păle	PSD	Buzău
George Sefer	PMP	Călărași
Predoiu Marian Cătălin	PNL	Călărași
Eugen Nicolicea	PSD	Călărași
Iulian Iacomi	PSD	Călărași
Ion Tăbugan	PMP	Caraș-Severin
Schelean-Șomfelean Valeria Daria	PNL	Caraș-Severin
Ion Mocioalcă	PSD	Caraș-Severin
Ion Spânu	PSD	Caraș-Severin
Luminița Maria Jivan	PSD	Caraș-Severin
Steluta Cataniciu	ALDE	Cluj
Stamatian Vasile Florin	PNL	Cluj
Oros Nechita-Adrian	PNL	Cluj
Moldovan Sorin-Dan	PNL	Cluj
Gabriel Horia Nasra	PSD	Cluj
Cornel Itu	PSD	Cluj
Cristina Burciu	PSD	Cluj
Botond Csoma	UDMR	Cluj
Emanuel Dumitru Ungureanu	USR	Cluj
Adrian Octavian Dohotaru	USR	Cluj
Mircea Banias	ALDE	Constanța
Robert Turcescu	PMP	Constanța
Hutuca Bogdan Iulian	PNL	Constanța
Boroianu Robert Aurel	PNL	Constanța
Iulian Iancu	PSD	Constanța
Mircea-Titus Dobre	PSD	Constanța
Ileana-Cristina Dumitrache	PSD	Constanța
Radu Babuș	PSD	Constanța
George-Gabriel Vișan	PSD	Constanța
Antal Istvan	UDMR	Constanța
Stelian-Cristian Ion	USR	Constanța
Octavian Goga	PMP	Covasna
Eika Benko	UDMR	Covasna
Maron Arpad	UDMR	Covasna
Jozsef-Gyorgy Kulcsar-Terza	UDMR	Covasna
Preda Cezar	PNL	Dâmbovița
Rovana Plumb	PSD	Dâmbovița
Leonardo Badea	PSD	Dâmbovița
Georgeta-Carmen Holban	PSD	Dâmbovița
Corneliu Ștefan	PSD	Dâmbovița
Oana-Silvia Vlăducă	PSD	Dâmbovița
Dumitru Lupescu	USR	Dâmbovița
Constantin Codreanu	PMP	Diaspora
Doru Petrișor Coliu	PMP	Diaspora
Mihai Voicu	PNL	Diaspora
Manuel Costescu	USR	Diaspora
Ion Cupa	ALDE	Dolj
Giugea Nicolae	PNL	Dolj
Stroe Ionuț Marian	PNL	Dolj
Lia Olguța Vasilescu	PSD	Dolj
Ion Călin	PSD	Dolj
Alina Elena Tănăsescu	PSD	Dolj
Alexandra Presură	PSD	Dolj
Florinel Stancu	PSD	Dolj
Eliza Mădălina Peța	PSD	Dolj
Adrian-Claudiu Prisnel	USR	Dolj
Eugen Durbacă	ALDE	Galați
Cătălin Cristache	PMP	Galați
Dobre Victor Paul	PNL	Galați
Viorel Ștefan	PSD	Galați
Florin Popa	PSD	Galați
Lucreția Roșca	PSD	Galați
Nicolae Dobrovici-Bacalbașa	PSD	Galați
Mitică-Marius Mărgărit	PSD	Galați
Bogdan Ionel Rodeanu	USR	Galați
Petcu Toma Florin	ALDE	Giurgiu
Răzvan-Alexandru Cuc	PSD	Giurgiu
Ioan Alexandru Andrei	PSD	Giurgiu
Cristina-Elena Dinu	PSD	Giurgiu
Dan Vîlceanu	PNL	Gorj
Victor-Viorel Ponta	PSD	Gorj
Mihai Weber	PSD	Gorj
Alin Vasile Văcaru	PSD	Gorj
Elvira Șarapatin	PSD	Gorj
Kelemen Hunor	UDMR	Harghita
Korodi Attila	UDMR	Harghita
Bende Sandor	UDMR	Harghita
Benedek Zakarias	UDMR	Harghita
Sebestyen Csaba-Istvan	UDMR	Harghita
Surgent Marius-Gheorghe	ALDE	Hunedoara
Heiuș Lucian	PNL	Hunedoara
Gheorghe Tinel	PNL	Hunedoara
Laurențiu Nistor	PSD	Hunedoara
Natalia-Elena Intotero	PSD	Hunedoara
Ilie Toma	PSD	Hunedoara
Petru-Sorin Marica	PSD	Hunedoara
Mihăiță Găină	PSD	Hunedoara
Andrei Pop	PSD	Hunedoara
Ștefan Mușoiu	PSD	Hunedoara
Varujan Vosganian	ALDE	Iași
Petru Movilă	PMP	Iași
Bodea Marius	PNL	Iași
Oprea Dumitru	PNL	Iași
Alexe Costel	PNL	Iași
Camelia Gavrilă	PSD	Iași
Nicolae Bănicioiu	PSD	Iași
Tudor Ciuhodaru	PSD	Iași
Vasile Cîtea	PSD	Iași
Silviu Nicu Macovei	PSD	Iași
Vasile Axinte	PSD	Iași
Cosette-Paula Chichirău	USR	Iași
Gheorghe Andrei Daniel	PNL	Ilfov
Culeafa Mihai	PNL	Ilfov
Alexandra-Corina Bogaciu	PSD	Ilfov
Constantin Cătălin Zamfira	PSD	Ilfov
Cornel Zainea	USR	Ilfov
Adrian Todoran	PMP	Maramureș
Cherecheș Viorica	PNL	Maramureș
Gheorghe Șimon	PSD	Maramureș
Marius-Sorin-Ovidiu Bota	PSD	Maramureș
Călin-Vasile-Andrei Matei	PSD	Maramureș
Apjok Norbert	UDMR	Maramureș
Vlad Emanuel Duruș	USR	Maramureș
Popescu Virgil Daniel	PNL	Mehedinți
Constantin Trușcă	PSD	Mehedinți
Vlad Bontea	PSD	Mehedinți
Alexandru Bălănescu	PSD	Mehedinți
Marius Pașcan	PMP	Mureș
Oprișcan Mihai Doru	PNL	Mureș
Corneliu-Florin Buicu	PSD	Mureș
Gheorghe-Dinu Socotar	PSD	Mureș
Vass Levente	UDMR	Mureș
Csép Andrea	UDMR	Mureș
Biró Zsolt	UDMR	Mureș
Lavinia Abu Amra	USR	Mureș
Cozmanciuc Mugur	PNL	Neamț
Leoreanu Laurențiu	PNL	Neamț
Ioan Munteanu	PSD	Neamț
Dănuț Andrușca	PSD	Neamț
Ciprian-Constantin Șerban	PSD	Neamț
Alexandru Rotaru	PSD	Neamț
Neculai Iftimie	PSD	Neamț
Iulian Bulai	USR	Neamț
Niță Mihai	ALDE	Olt
Știrbu Gigel Sorinel	PNL	Olt
Florin Iordache	PSD	Olt
Dan Ciocan	PSD	Olt
Alexandru Stănescu	PSD	Olt
Marius-Ionel Iancu	PSD	Olt
Gavrilescu Grațiela	ALDE	Prahova
Cătălina Bozianu	PMP	Prahova
Ionescu George	PNL	Prahova
Prisca Răzvan Sorin	PNL	Prahova
Anastase Roberta Alma	PNL	Prahova
Rodica Paraschiv	PSD	Prahova
Cornel Nanu	PSD	Prahova
Andrei Nicolae	PSD	Prahova
Laura-Mihaela Moagher	PSD	Prahova
Ludmila Sfîrloagă	PSD	Prahova
Dan Răzvan Rădulescu	USR	Prahova
Liviu Ioan Balint	PMP	Sălaj
Lucian Nicolae Bode	PNL	Sălaj
Iuliu Nosa	PSD	Sălaj
Seres Denes	UDMR	Sălaj
Nicoară Romeo Florin	PNL	Satu Mare
Ioana Bran	PSD	Satu Mare
Octavian Petric	PSD	Satu Mare
Magyar Lóránd	UDMR	Satu Mare
Erdei-Dolóczki István	UDMR	Satu Mare
Raluca Turcan	PNL	Sibiu
Nicolae Neagu	PNL	Sibiu
Constantin Șovăială	PNL	Sibiu
Ovidiu-Ioan Sitterli	PSD	Sibiu
Ioan Terea	PSD	Sibiu
Ilie-Dan Barna	USR	Sibiu
Baisanu Stefan-Alexandru	ALDE	Suceava
Bălan Ioan	PNL	Suceava
Fador Angelica	PNL	Suceava
Gheorghiu Bogdan	PNL	Suceava
Mihălescul Dumitru	PNL	Suceava
Eugen Bejinariu	PSD	Suceava
Maricela Cobuz	PSD	Suceava
Cătălin-Ioan Nechifor	PSD	Suceava
Alexandru Rădulescu	PSD	Suceava
Emilian-Iuliu Havrici	PSD	Suceava
Florică Ică Calotă	ALDE	Teleorman
Calista Mara Daniela	PNL	Teleorman
Nicolae Liviu Dragnea	PSD	Teleorman
Adrian Ionuț Gâdea	PSD	Teleorman
Valentin Gabriel Boboc	PSD	Teleorman
Cucsa Marian Gheorghe	ALDE	Timiș
Cornel Sămărtinean	PMP	Timiș
Marilen Pirtea	PNL	Timiș
Ben Oni Ardelean	PNL	Timiș
Pavel Popescu	PNL	Timiș
Călin-Ionel Dobra	PSD	Timiș
Alfred-Robert Simonis	PSD	Timiș
Radu-Adrian Pau	PSD	Timiș
Bianca-Miruna Gavriliță	PSD	Timiș
Cătălin Drulă	USR	Timiș
Gudu Vasile	PNL	Tulcea
Siscu George	PNL	Tulcea
Andaluzia Luca	PSD	Tulcea
Lucian-Eduard Simion	PSD	Tulcea
Lovin Dumitru	ALDE	Vâlcea
Buican Cristian	PNL	Vâlcea
Vasile Cocoș	PSD	Vâlcea
Daniela Oteșanu	PSD	Vâlcea
Ștefan-Ovidiu Popa	PSD	Vâlcea
Eugen Neață	PSD	Vâlcea
Corneliu Bichineț	PMP	Vaslui
Olteanu Daniel	PNL	Vaslui
Adrian Solomon	PSD	Vaslui
Ana Birchall	PSD	Vaslui
Irinel Ioan Stativă	PSD	Vaslui
Aurel Căciulă	PSD	Vaslui
Mihai-Cătălin Botez	USR	Vaslui
Ștefan Ion	PNL	Vrancea
Angel Tîlvăr	PSD	Vrancea
Dragoș-Petruț Bârlădeanu	PSD	Vrancea
Nicușor Halici	PSD	Vrancea
Tudorița-Rodica Boboc	PSD	Vrancea
Ecaterina Orbean	Minorities group	
Varujan Pambuccian	Minorities group	
Silviu Vexler	Minorities group	
Miron Ignat	Minorities group	
Daniel Vasile	Minorities group	
Slavoliub Adnagi	Minorities group	
Ibraim Iusein	Minorities group	
Petronela-Mihaela Csokany	Minorities group	
Bogdan Alin Stoica	Minorities group	
Mariana-Venera Popescu	Minorities group	
Dragoș Gabriel Zisopol	Minorities group	
Giurgeci Slobodan Ghera	Minorities group	
Ovidiu Ganț	Minorities group	
Victoria Longher	Minorities group	
Andi Gabriel Grosaru	Minorities group	
Iulius Firczak	Minorities group	
