= Nosa =

Nosa or NOSA may refer to:

== Places ==
- Nosa, Spain, singular population entity in Balsareny
- Nosa (Russia), river in Yaroslavl Oblast, Russia

== People ==
- Nosa (musician) (born 1981), Nigerian gospel singer
- Nosa Igiebor (born 1990), Nigerian footballer
- Nosa Igiebor (journalist) (born 1952), Nigerian journalist
- Iuliu Nosa (born 1956), Romanian politician

== Organizations ==
- Norwegian Space Agency
- Iran Software & Hardware Co. (NOSA)

== Other uses ==
- Nosa (antlion), an antlion genus in the tribe Palparini
- NASA Open Source Agreement
- NOAA Observing System Architecture
- Nosa, Serbia, a hamlet in Serbia
