= Vilafruns =

- Singular population entity
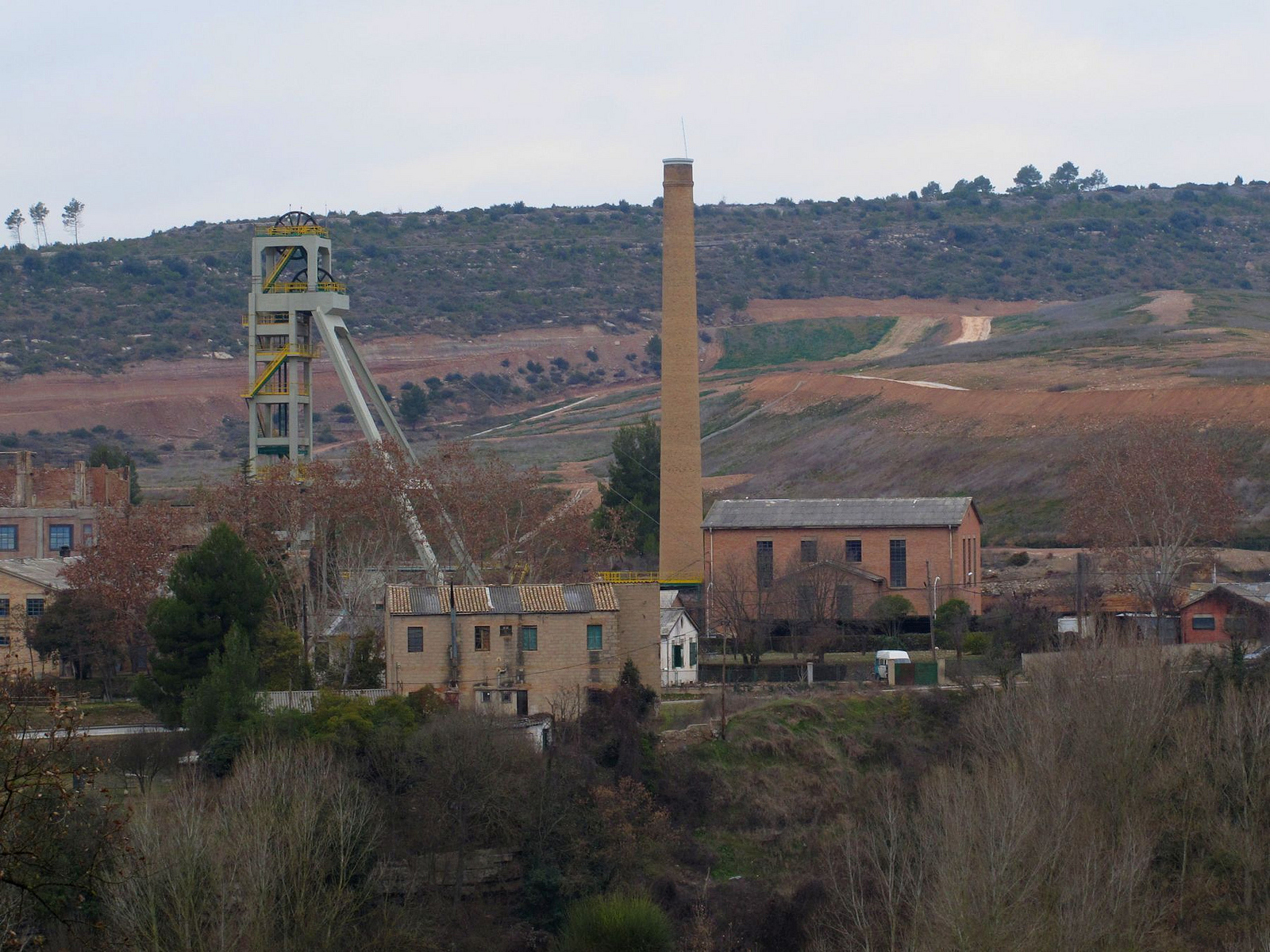
- Factory in Vilafruns

- Location within Spain Location within Catalonia Location within Province of Barcelona
- Coordinates: 41°50′39.6″N 1°52′35.3″E
- Country: Spain
- A. community: Catalunya
- Province: Barcelona
- Municipality: Balsareny

Population (January 1, 2024)
  - Total: 54
- Time zone: UTC+01:00
- Postal code: 08660
- MCN: 08191000500
- Website: Official website

Vilafruns is a singular population entity in the municipality of Balsareny, in Catalonia, Spain.

As of 2024, it has a population of 54 people.

== History ==
In the 1860s, a textile factory was made in the municipality. It closed in 1966 before reopening in 1972.
