= Justice and Respect in Europe for All Party =

Justice and Respect in Europe for All Party Dreptate și Respect în Europa pentru Toți
- Abbreviation: DREPT
- Leader: Vlad Gheorghe
- Founded: December 2023
- Split from: USR; PNL; AUR; UDMR
- Headquarters: Sector 5, Bucharest
- Ideology: Anti-corruption; Faction: Romanian nationalism
- Political position: Centre to centre-right
- Colours: Blue
- Senate: 0 / 134
- Chamber of Deputies: 0 / 330
- Local councils: 0 / 39,900

The Justice and Respect in Europe for All Party (Romanian: Partidul Dreptate și Respect în Europa pentru Toți, DREPT) is a Romanian nationalist non-parliamentary political party that has an anti-corruption discourse.

The party is represented publicly by Vlad Gheorghe, a former independent MEP, and aims to be an electoral platform for independent candidates and small anti-system parties.

From 2 September through 1 December 2024, the party had representation in the Romanian Parliament. They initially had ten deputies, but five were expelled because of their association with establishment parties.

== Members ==
Party	Abbr.	Ideology	Position	Leader
Justice and Respect in Europe for All Party	DREPT	Anti-corruption; Anti-establishment; Big-tent	Big-tent	Vlad Gheorghe
United Diaspora Party	PDU	Populism; Romanians abroad interests Anti-corruption; Environmentalism	Centre to right-wing	Marius Mocan
Courage for Romania	CURAJ/ Romania ECO	Humanism; Pragmatism; Romanian nationalism	Centrism	Cosette Chichirău
Independents	IND	—N/a	Diverse	—N/a

== Founding deputies ==
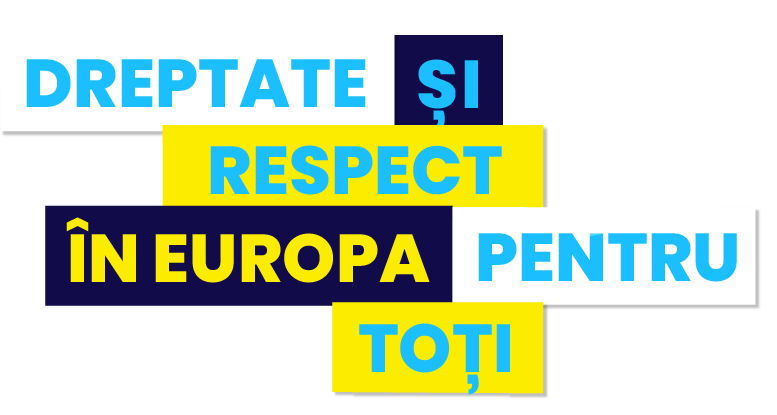
- Ion-Marian Lazăr (ex-USR)
- Daniel-Sorin Gheba (ex-AUR)—expelled on 16 September 2024
- Radu Tudor Ciornei (ex-USR)
- Daniel Florea (ex-AUR)—expelled on 16 September 2024
- Liviu-Ioan Balint (ex-PNL)—expelled on 16 September 2024
- Gheorghe Pecingină (ex-PNL)—expelled on 16 September 2024
- Daniel-Liviu Toda (ex-USR)
- Cristian-Paul Ichim (ex-USR)
- Florică Ică Calotă (ex-AUR)—expelled on 16 September 2024
- Norbert Apjok (ex-UDMR)

== Reception ==
The migration of the 10 deputies from different parties with various ideologies to the DREPT Party on 2 September 2024 was treated with suspicion in the Romanian press. According to unofficial sources, the DREPT Party will support Mircea Geoană in the 2024 presidential elections, and will be able to send observers to voting stations after becoming the parliamentary party.

== Electoral history ==
=== Legislative elections ===
Election	Chamber			Senate			Position	Aftermath
Election	Votes	%	Seats	Votes	%	Seats	Position	Aftermath
2024	107,474	1.16	0 / 330	114,500	1.24	0 / 134	12th	Opposition to PSD-PNL-UDMR minority government (2024–2025)
2024	107,474	1.16	0 / 330	114,500	1.24	0 / 134	12th	Opposition to PSD-PNL-USR-UDMR government (2025–present)

=== Presidential elections ===
Election	Candidate	First round			Second round		
Election	Candidate	Votes	Percentage	Position	Votes	Percentage	Position
2025	Endorsed Nicușor Dan	1,979,767	20.99%	2nd	6,168,642	53.60%	1st
