= Floroiu =

Floroiu is a surname. Notable people with the surname include:

- Ilie Floroiu (born 1952), Romanian long-distance runner
- Ionel Floroiu (born 1962), Romanian politician
