= Marian Vanghelie =

Romanian politician (born 1968)

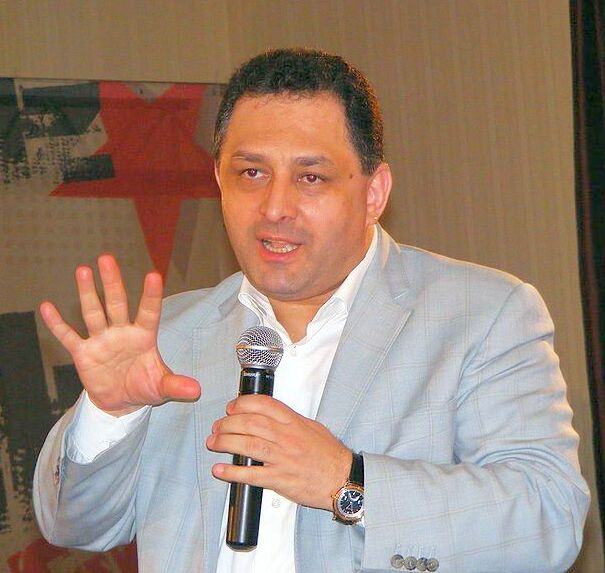
- Vanghelie speaking to a Social Democratic Youth audience in Otopeni in 2009

Mayor of the 5th Sector of Bucharest
- In office 2000–2016

Personal details
- Born: Daniel Marian Vanghelie; 1968 (age 57–58) Bucharest, Romania
- Party: PSS (1993–1994); PDSR (1994–2001); PSD (2001–2004); Independent (2004–2005); PSD (2005–2014); PRSO (2015–2016); PER (2020–2024); Romanian Sovereigntist Bloc (2024–present)
- Spouse: Charlotte
- Children: 1
- Occupation: Politician

Daniel Marian Vanghelie (born 1968) is a Romanian politician, the former mayor of the 5th Sector of Bucharest (2000–2016) and a former member of the Romanian Social Democratic Party (PSD).

He ran for a fifth term in 2016 as an independent but was defeated by social-democratic candidate Daniel Florea. Vanghelie came in 3rd place, receiving fewer votes than both the social democratic candidate and the liberal candidate, Ovidiu Raețchi.

== Early life ==
Vanghelie was born in 1968 in Bucharest.

== Career ==
Vanghelie entered the Romanian politics in the early 1990s, as a member of Miron Mitrea's Party of Social Solidarity and later as a member of the Party of Social Democracy in Romania. Best described as a populist, Vanghelie started his center-stage political career in the year 2000, when he was elected mayor in the same sector. Although he was not particularly well-known, Vanghelie made a name for himself through his populism. He promotes himself as a tell-it-like-it-is, if not particularly well-educated everyman, out to help the simple people. One of Vanghelie's most famous publicity stunts is the New Year's Celebrations the Fifth Sector Mayor's Office organizes every year, very popular with many of the residents of the sector, which has the lowest average income in Bucharest.

Due to allegations of corruption made against him by the Romanian PNA, Vanghelie was excluded from the Romanian Social Democratic Party (PSD) before the Bucharest 2004 local elections. Running at the time as an independent candidate, Vanghelie was the only of the six Bucharest district mayors to win from the first round, at a comfortable 27% margin. Following his electoral victory, he was re-accepted in PSD, although his National Anticorruption Directorate files were not closed. Vanghelie's return into the Social Democratic Party (PSD) brought up to two the number of district mayoral seats the PSD held to in Bucharest.

The slogan used by Adriean Videanu against him in the Bucharest 2005 mayor elections was count on the one who counts (Romanian: contează pe cine contează), a catch-phrase meant to disparage Vanghelie's lower-class background and lack of formal education. Vanghelie did provoke a measure of public concern when he was unable to conjugate the verb a fi (to be) on national television, earning him the derisive nickname "Vanghelie Care Este" (Vanghelie Who Is).

In 2008 he had General Iacob Lahovary's remains removed from his tomb at Bellu Cemetery; Vanghelie's grandfather, Constantin Niculae, was buried there, instead.

In 2019 he founded the Independent Social Democratic Party (PSDI), which he described as more leftist than PSD and a left-wing nationalist party and which supported his candidacy for mayor of Sector 5.

In May 2021, Vanghelie was sentenced by the Bucharest Tribunal to 11 years and 8 months for corruption. The judge decided to convict Vanghelie for each of the three charges brought against him: bribery, abuse of office, and money laundering.

In April 2024, the Independent Social Democratic Party, founded by Marian Vanghelie and led by Leonard Petre, joined the Romanian Sovereignist Bloc. The Bloc supports Vanghelie's candidacy for mayor of Sector 5.

== Electoral history ==
=== Mayor of Sector 5 ===
Election	Affiliation	First round			Second round		
Election	Affiliation	Votes	Percentage	Position	Votes	Percentage	Position
2000	PDSR	31,403	41.40%	1st	53,628	63.71%	1st
2004	Independent	52,561	50.77%	1st	–		
2008	PSD	30,594	38.95%	1st	48,984	56.22%	1st
2012	USL	60,882	54.84%	1st			
2016	PDS	15,227	20.82%	3rd			
2020	PSDI	11,237	12.18%	4th			
2024	BSR	TBD	TBD	TBD			

== Personal life ==
Vanghelie's parents divorced when he was a young boy and his father, who is Jewish, emigrated to Israel, where he is a businessman.

He and his wife Charlotte have a son, Alexandru (born 1994). He has a half-brother, Paul.
