= Hutu (disambiguation) =

Hutu are an African ethnic group.

Hutu may also refer to:

- Hutu (tree), a New Zealand native tree Ascarina lucida
- Huțu, a village near Găiceana, Romania
- Alexandra Huțu (born 1988), Romanian politician
