= La Rabeia =

la Rabeia
- Singular population entity
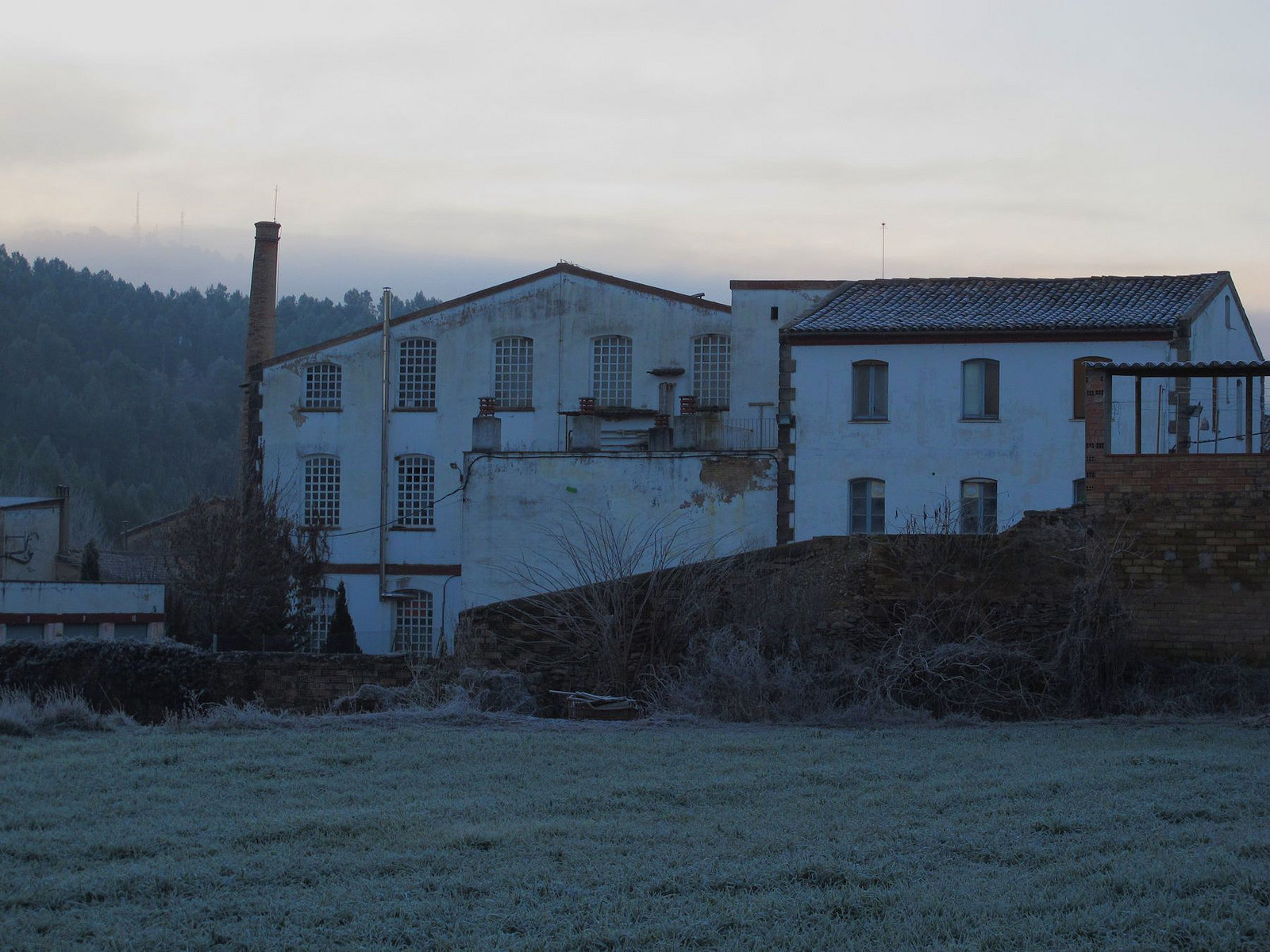
- La Rabeia (Balsareny)

- Location within Spain Location within Catalonia Location within Province of Barcelona
- Coordinates: 41°52′39.5″N 1°53′25.5″E
- Country: Spain
- A. community: Catalunya
- Province: Barcelona
- Municipality: Balsareny

Population (January 1, 2024)
  - Total: 80
- Time zone: UTC+01:00
- Postal code: 08660
- MCN: 08191000300
- Website: Official website

la Rabeia is a singular population entity in the municipality of Balsareny, in Catalonia, Spain.

As of 2024 it has a population of 80 people.
