= 2020 Suceava County local elections =

2020 elections held in Suceava County

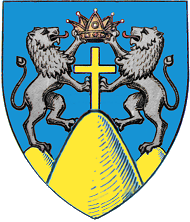
- 27 September 2020
- Turnout: 45.08%

	First party	Second party	Third party
Party	PNL	PSD	PMP
Seats before	21	16	0
Seats won	18	13	5
Seat change	▼3	▼3	▲5
Popular vote	104,013	77,406	28,044
Percentage	40.94%	30.47%	11.04%
President before election
Gheorghe Flutur
PNL
Elected President
Gheorghe Flutur
PNL

The 2020 Suceava County local elections took place on 27 September. A total of 9,190 candidates ran for various local positions, such as local councilors, mayors, county councilors and the President of the County Council.

== County Council results ==
President of the County Council
Party	Candidate	Votes	Votes %
National Liberal Party	Gheorghe Flutur	106,960	41.59
Social Democratic Party	Mirela Elena Adomnicăi	82,216	31.97
People's Movement Party	Ioan-Bogdan Codreanu	24,573	9.56
USR-PLUS Alliance	Dan Nichiforel	14,191	5.52
PRO Romania	Alexandra Harja-Samsonescu	9,471	3,68
Ecologist Party of Romania	Cătălina-Elena Vartic	6,396	2.49
Alliance for the Union of Romanians	Dorel-Gheorghe Acatrinei	4,537	1.76
Alliance of Liberals and Democrats	Octavian Ilisoi	3,354	1.30
Green Party	Aristide Maxim-Samuilă	3,263	1.27
Social Liberal Humanist Party	Ilie Homeniuc	2,208	0.86
Total		257,169	100

Composition of the County Council
Party	Votes	Votes %	Seats	Change
National Liberal Party	104,013	40.94	18	▼3
Social Democratic Party	77,406	30.47	13	▼3
People's Movement Party	28,044	11.04	5	▲5
Others	44,575	17.55	0	Steady
Total	254,038	100	36	N/A

== Local councils results ==
Composition of the local councils
Party	Votes	Votes %	Seats
National Liberal Party	68,800	26.63	427
Social Democratic Party	53,969	20.89	405
People's Movement Party	3,261	1.26	24
USR-PLUS Alliance	1,120	0.43	10
The Right Alternative	1,914	0.74	9
PRO Romania	836	0.32	5
Alliance of Liberals and Democrats	404	0.16	4
Others	128,086	49.57	10
Total	258,390	100	884

== Mayoral results ==
Mayoral elections by party
Party	Mayors
National Liberal Party	53
Social Democratic Party	48
Independent	4
People's Movement Party	4
The Right Alternative	1
PRO Romania	1
Others	3
Total	114
