= Acatrinei =

Acatrinei is a Romanian surname. Notable people with the surname include:

- Andreea Acatrinei (born 1992), Romanian artistic gymnast
- Dorel-Gheorghe Acatrinei (born 1977), Romanian politician
