= Party of Social Solidarity =

Party of Social Solidarity Partidul Solidarității Sociale
- Abbreviation: PSS
- President: Miron Mitrea
- Founder: Miron Mitrea
- Founded: 1993
- Dissolved: 1994
- Merged into: Party of Social Democracy in Romania
- Ideology: Labourism; Social justice
- Political position: Center-left

The Party of Social Solidarity (Romanian: Partidul Solidarității Sociale, PSS) was a political party in Romania, founded in 1993. It was founded and led by Miron Mitrea.

The party merged into the Party of Social Democracy in Romania (PDSR) in 1994, with Mitrea becoming the secretary of the PDSR.

== Notable former members ==
- Miron Mitrea
- Marian Vanghelie
- Cristian Popescu Piedone
