= Nosa, Spain =

Nosa
- Singular population entity
- Location within Spain Location within Catalonia Location within Province of Barcelona
- Coordinates: 41°47′56.6″N 1°54′35.3″E
- Country: Spain
- A. community: Catalunya
- Province: Barcelona
- Municipality: Balsareny

Population (January 1, 2024)
  - Total: 299
- Time zone: UTC+01:00
- Postal code: 08660
- MCN: 08018000200
- Website: Official website

Nosa is a singular population entity in the municipality of Balsareny, in Catalonia, Spain.

As of 2024 it has a population of 299 people.
