= Csaba Könczei =

Romanian politician (born 1966)

Member of the Chamber of Deputies
- Incumbent
- Assumed office 21 December 2020
- Constituency: Covasna

Personal details
- Born: 22 February 1966 (age 60)
- Party: UDMR

Csaba Könczei (born 22 February 1966) is a Romanian politician who is member of the Chamber of Deputies.

== Biography ==
He was elected in 2020.

== See also ==
- List of members of the Chamber of Deputies of Romania (2020–2024)
