= Evin Incir =

Swedish politician (born 1984)

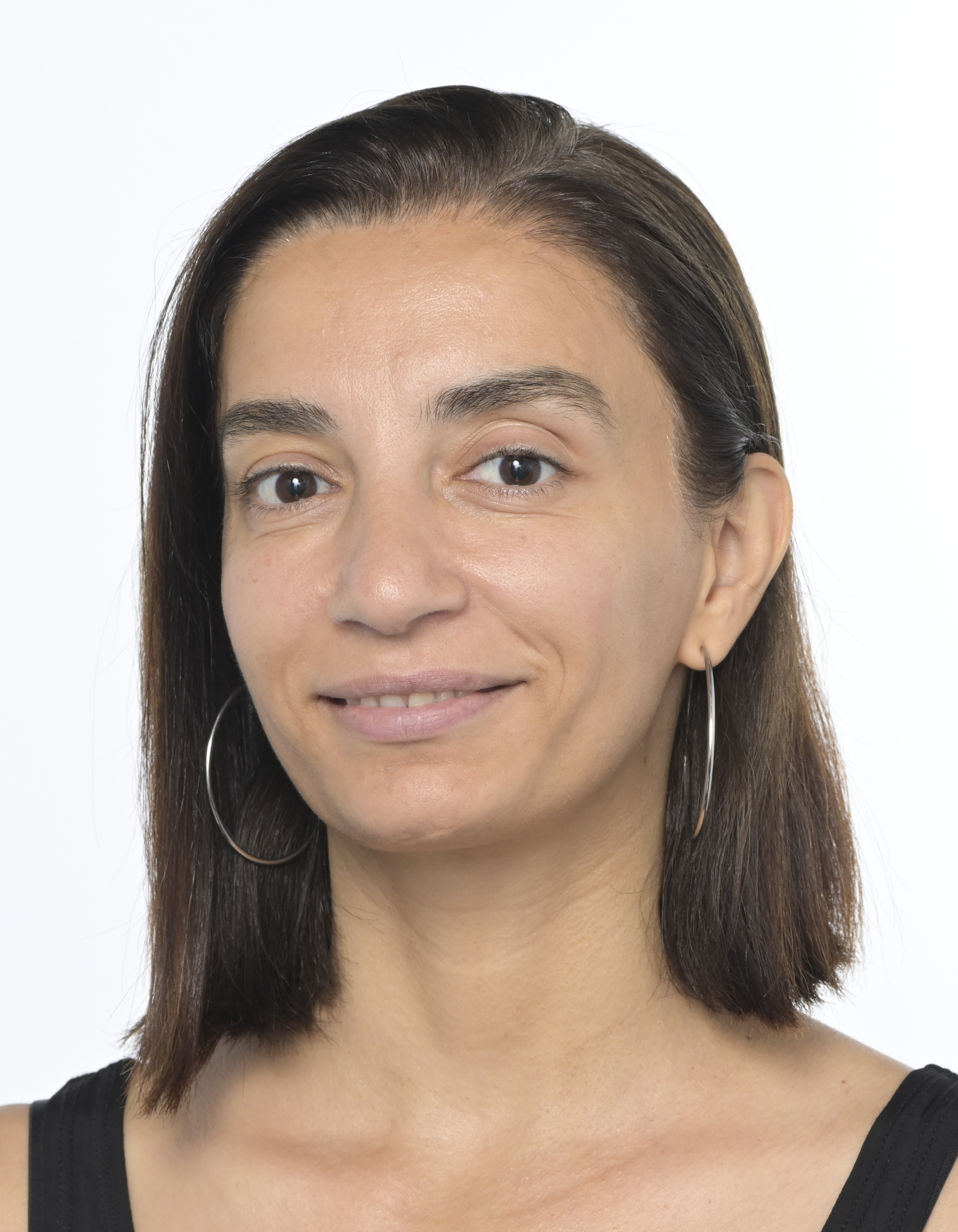
- Incir in 2024
- Incumbent
- Assumed office 2019

Personal details
- Born: 15 June 1984 (age 42) Diyarbakır, Turkey

Evin Incir (born 15 June 1984) is a Swedish politician of Kurdish descent for the Swedish Social Democratic Party who has been serving as a Member of the European Parliament since the 2019 European elections.

== Early and private life ==
Incir was born on 15 June 1984 in the Kurdish city Diyarbakır, Turkey. She arrived in Sweden in 1990 at the age of six and grew up in Bergsjön, Gothenburg, before moving to Uppsala to pursue her studies in Law.

She played table tennis in Gärdsmosse Bordtennisklubb from the age of 11 to the age of 15 – district and regional competitions, but gave up the sport to focus on her growing involvement in youth politics. Before quitting, she also coached younger girls in table tennis until the age of 17.

Her parents and two brothers still reside in Gothenburg, while she prefers to keep her personal life private.

== Political career ==
Incir has a background in the Swedish Social Democratic Youth League (SSU) and became the district chair of SSU in Gothenburg in 2005. At the age of 22, she was elected to the Gothenburg City Council.

From 2011 to 2015, she served on the national executive board of SSU.

She has served as Secretary-General of the International Union of Socialist Youth (IUSY) 2014–2016 and worked on Middle Eastern affairs at the Olof Palme International Center 2016–2017, where she also represented SSU on the board.

She has also served as Deputy International Secretary of the Swedish Social Democratic Party 2017–2019.

In her role as Member of the European Parliament, she has been serving on the Committee on Civil Liberties, Justice and Home Affairs and Committee on Foreign Affairs since 2019, as well as appointed as the European Parliament’s Standing Rapporteur for the Relationship with the Palestinian Authorities.

In addition to her committee assignments, Incir is Vice Chair of Delegation for relations with Iraq, including the EU-Iraq Parliamentary Cooperation Committee and Member of Delegation to the Euro-Latin American Parliamentary Assembly.

During her first mandate, 2019–2024, she was Vice Chair of the Delegation for the Relationship with the Palestinian Authorities and part of the Parliament's delegations to the EU-Turkey Joint Parliamentary Committee since 2019 and to the Euro-Mediterranean Parliamentary Assembly since 2021. She was also a member of the European Parliament Anti-Racism and Diversity Intergroup, the European Parliament Intergroup on LGBT Rights, the European Parliament Intergroup on Trade Unions, and the European Parliament Intergroup on Western Sahara.

== Legislations ==
During the current parliamentary mandate, Incir’s legislative work has primarily focused on combating organised crime and terrorism.

In 2026, Incir was appointed the European Parliament’s rapporteur for the EU Directive on combating firearms trafficking and other firearms-related offences. It aims to be adopted in the European Parliament in December 2026 to enter interinstitutional negotiations (trilogues). Incir was also appointed shadow-rapporteur for the Drug Precursors Regulation and the Signature of the Additional Protocol amending the Council of Europe Convention on the Prevention of Terrorism on behalf of the Progressive Alliance of Socialists and Democrats.

In 2024, Incir was appointed European Parliament’s Co-rapporteur, together with Frances Fitzgerald, for the EU's first ever Directive on Combating Violence Against Women and Domestic Violence.

The legislation was adopted 2024. The deadline for implemention in all the 27 EU Member States is on July 2027.

In 2026, Incir initiated a report in the European Parliament aimed at increasing pressure on the European Commission to propose EU-wide legislation establishing a consent-based definition of rape, addressing a critical gap in the Directive adopted in 2024. The report was adopted with a vote of 447 in favor, 160 against, and 43 abstentions.

== Appointments ==
In 2023, Incir was – by the High Representative of the Union for Foreign Affairs and Security Policy and Vice-President of the European Commission, Josep Borrell – appointed EU Chief Observer for the European Union Election Observation Mission to Sierra Leone. The EU EOM Sierra Leone 2023 at its full strength was composed of some 100 observers, drawn from 26 EU Member States, Canada, and Norway.

== Nominations ==
In 2017, Incir was nominated for the position of United Nations Youth Envoy by the Swedish Government and the International Union of Socialist Youth. Her candidacy also received support from the international conservative youth organisation, as well as the European Democrat Students.

== Recognitions ==
1. In December 2020, Incir received the Best Newcomer award at The Parliament Magazine's annual MEP Awards.
2. In June 2022, Incir won the award for diversity, inclusion and social impact at The Parliament Magazine's annual MEP Awards.
3. In June 2023, Incir was the joint recipient of the Promoting European Value Award, alongside fellow MEP Vlad Gheorghe at The Parliament Magazine's annual MEP Awards
4. In 2023 Incir was recipient of Madeleine Leijonhufvud prize by FATTA! , a Swedish Organization that fights against sexual violence and promotes affirmative consent in legislation and practice.
5. In March 2024 Incir was the joint winner, alongside Irish MEP Frances Fitzgerald, of the "European Values Champion of the Mandate" award at The Parliament Magazine's annual MEP Awards.
6. In April 2024 Incir was awarded with the prize “Women’s Achievement of the Year” by Roks, the National Organisation for Women’s Shelters and Young Women's Shelters in Sweden.
7. In November 2026, Incir was shortlisted alongside European Commission Executive Vice-President Teresa Ribera and Montenegrin Minister of European Affairs Maida Gorčević for the 2026 Women of Europe Awards in the "Woman in Power" category, organized by the European Movement International and the European Women's Lobby.
