= Ovidiu Raețchi =

Romanian politician

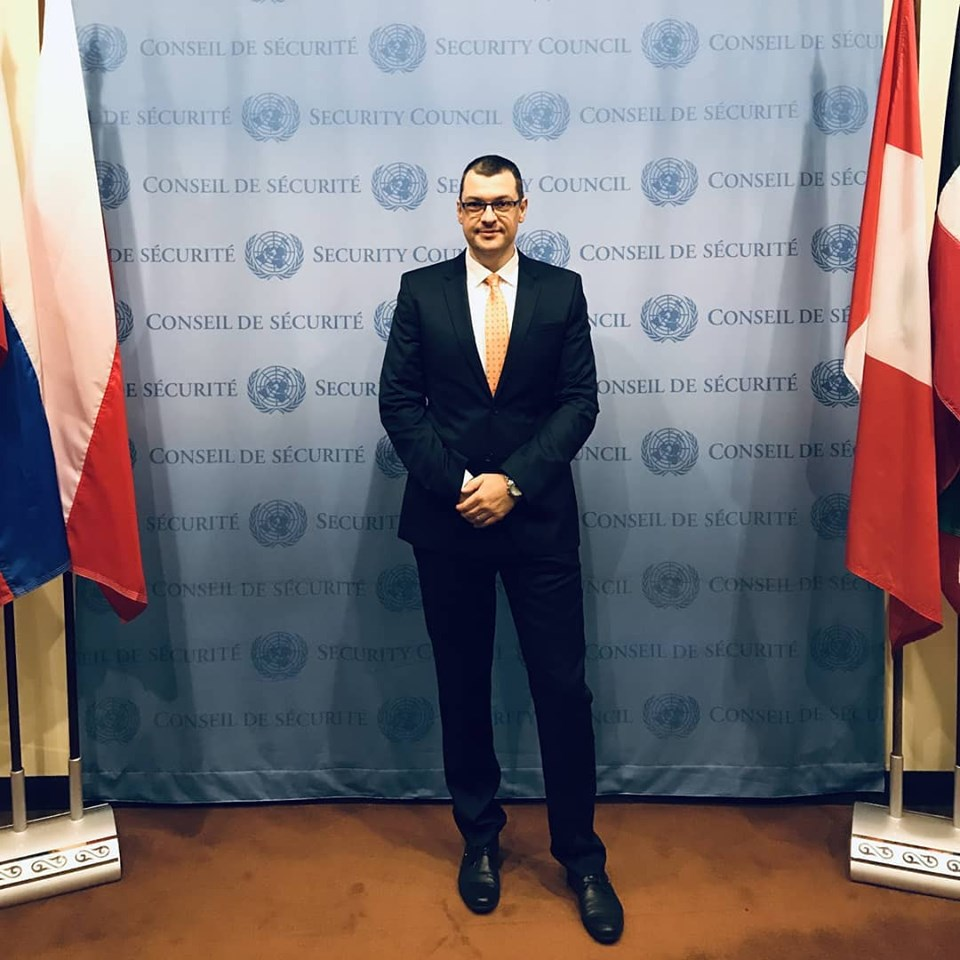
Ovidiu Raețchi at the UN Headquarters in August 2019

Ovidiu Alexandru Raețchi (born 15 September 1979) has been accredited as Ambassador Extraordinary and Plenipotentiary of Romania in Japan.

He is a Romanian politician. In December 2016, he was elected member of the Chamber of Deputies in Bucharest constituency. He is a member of the National Liberal Party (PNL).

== Offices held ==
Also, Ovidiu Raețchi was elected vice president of the Committee for Defence, Public Order and National Security of the Chamber of Deputies. In July 2017, the Executive Political Bureau of the National Liberal Party (PNL) appointed him as chairman of the party's National Defence and Security Committee, a structure that coordinates PNL's national defence and security policies and develops the governing program on this field of the main opposition party from Romania.

In 2012, Ovidiu Raeţchi was elected a member of the Chamber of Deputies in Diaspora Constituency representing the Middle East and Africa. In the 2012 elections he obtained 52%, mainly votes from the Romanian soldiers in Afghanistan, the Romanians from Israel and some Arab countries (Palestine, Jordan, Tunisia, Morocco).

In the 2012–2016 legislature he was a member of the following standing committees:

- Committee for Defence, Public Order and National Security
- Committee of the Romanian communities abroad

== Political activities ==
As part of his parliamentary work, Ovidiu Raețchi initiated the laws that established Romanian Community Centers abroad, the vote by correspondence for Romanians that reside abroad, and has initiated draft laws aimed at the protection of Romanian citizens who work in foreign countries. Raețchi has also initiated draft laws for the restoration of buildings with seismic risk; the establishment of the National Museum of the Victims of Communism; preventing and combating domestic violence; and the protection of people with Down syndrome. Ovidiu Raețchi is also the originator of the law of an Advocate for Diaspora, deputy Ombudsman specialised in issues of Romanians living abroad.

Also, he took controversial steps like supporting the Syrian opposition by opening a political representation of the revolutionaries in Bucharest or supporting the expulsion of the Assadist ambassador to Bucharest. He claimed that Persian Gulf countries (UAE, Saudi Arabia) should be a strategic priority of the Romanian state.

He intervened in the evacuation scandal of the Literature Museum, by addressing to the Presidents of both Houses of Parliament a letter in which he proposed to move the Romanian Literature Museum in the Palace of Parliament. He asked the leadership of the Chamber of Deputies to amend the Regulation of the Chamber of Deputies to ensure transparent and open voting to requests of immunity waiver.

As a member of the Defence Committee he pleaded for increasing the Army's budget so that it meets NATO criteria. On April 25, 2014, he asked the National Defence Minister Mircea Dușa to increase the budget for the modernization of the Romanian Army.

He insisted on numerous occasions for a national debate on the monarchy. On April 5, 2014, he sent a letter to the Presidents of both Houses of Parliament on the need to open a debate on a hypotheses of monarchy in Romania.

Until he was elected member of the Chamber of Deputies, he was president of the Foundation Protecting the Citizens Against Abuses of the State.

== Mayoral race ==
In June 2015, Raețchi announced that he will run for mayor of Sector 5: "You never refuse a manly, heavy battle with The Social Democratic Party (PSD). You go in the ring and send your opponent to go take a walk. The new system of the parliamentary elections - based on a list system - almost cancels the charm of an open fight in two. That's why you don't refuse a mayor race if you like confrontation".

In the local elections held in June 2016, Ovidiu Raeţchi obtained 26.30% (19,232 votes), ranking No. 2, after the Social Democrat candidate - Daniel Florea and in front of the former mayor Marian Vanghelie. Ovidiu Raeţchi's percentage was the best score of a Liberal candidate obtained in the local elections in Bucharest in 2016.

== Projects and initiatives ==
Ovidiu Raeţchi is the initiator of the "Central Garden" which proposes the redevelopment of the area around the Parliament's Palace. It requires the demolition of the wall surrounding the courtyard of the Parliament House and the integration of 35 hectares of green space by building a park covering the area around the Parliament Palace, the academy and Izvor Park.

On 18 July 2016, he became Vice President of PNL Bucharest, after the meeting of the Political Bureau of the National Liberal Party.

In November 2016, Ovidiu Raeţchi initiated the "Liberal School" project, an initiative which involved organizing seminars and workshops with teachers, experts, political leaders and civil society. The topics addressed in these debates and seminars were "Political philosophy", "Conservatism", "Libertarianism", "Feminism", "Political Communication", "Management of the election campaign" and "History of Romanian liberalism". Party leaders like Ionut Stroe, Radu Carp, members of civil society and journalists like Ovidiu Neacșu were among the "teachers" who gave lectures and seminars. Also, Ovidiu Raeţchi released the "Liberal", an ideological publication of the National Liberal Party.

== Personal life ==
Since September 4, 2016, Ovidiu Raeţchi is married to Laura Diana Raeţchi (Sitea, before marriage), the United Nations expert on Middle East and the only Romanian who was part of the negotiating team with Syria. Born in Brașov, Laura graduated from the American University in Bulgaria with a Soros scholarship and also graduated from a masters program at The Fletcher School of Law and Diplomacy in Massachusetts. From 2006, she is the UN analyst for Sudan and Syria.

Ovidiu Raeţchi has a degree in political science from the National School of Political and Administrative Studies, a master's degree in Islamic Civilization Studies at the University of Bucharest, a master's degree in Hebrew culture and civilization at the same university and is currently pursuing two Doctoral degrees at the University of Bucharest and the National School of Political and Administrative Studies.

== Books ==
Also, he published eight books of essays and political analysis:

- "Esteistica", Niculescu Publishing, 2004;
- "Agora" Intact Publishing, 2012;
- "Anti - Dugin. Christian Democrat Civilization and a project for Russia", 2014;
- "The Great Firefly theory" and other ideas of the Right wing", 2014;
- "Short treatise on love", (Nemira Publishing, February 2017) - a collection of essays in which the author takes a look at the most important questions the humanity has about love. The answers in his essays imply a critical return to classical ideas such as those of Plato, Stendhal, Kierkegaard or Ortega y Gasset. A tonic book, without any solemn stakes, represents an approach from the perspective of the history of culture and philosophy of some essential erotic themes;
- "Putin, the soldier, and Dughin, the philosopher - Russian civilization ahead of a new imperialist error", (Nemira Publishing, October 2017)- an anatomy of Russia's expansionist ideology and the mystifications on which it is based. In the last two centuries, Russia has used three expansionist ideologies: • Tsarist ideology: nationalist, imperialist, panslavist, orthodox; • Communist ideology: universalist, imperialist, secular; • Putin-Dughin ideology: nationalist, imperialist, Eurasian, orthodox. The first decades of the USSR were, perhaps paradoxically, the only time the Russian Empire gained a notable seductive power, based on a doctrine of universal coverage, which could capture the attention of intellectuals from that time. Counting on nationalism, Putin and his predecessors, the tsars, chose instead to rely solely on force and fear. The Eurasian Russian Empire that Dughin dreams of is thawed on the basis of two civilization mystifications that make it impossible: an Orthodox and an Asian mysticism. The book tries to explain the two distortions;
- "Tzahal: a history of the Israeli army(2019) represents a thorough scan in over 600 pages of the history and challenges which one of today's most powerful, active and appreciated armies in the world is confronted. Starting with the first self-defense forces organised in Palestine by the Zionist pioneers at the beginning of the 20th century (Shomrim, Hashomer), going forward with the more complex structures which fought for the founding of a Jewish country (Haganah, Palmach, even the revisionist forces Irgun or Lehi), the work of Ovidiu Raetchi works its way towards the present, including the latest clashes with Hamas and Hezbollah from the summer of 2019. The operations which took place in the last decades in Gaza, West Bank or Lebanon are also covered in a wide portrayal. Nevertheless, the most ample and thorough chapters are about the political context analysis, the psychology of the leaders, the military tactics and the armament and ammo used in the great conflicts with the arab states from 1948 (The Independence War), 1967 (The Six Day War) or 1973 (The Yom Kippur War). Raetchi offers a detailed portraits of the great Israeli generals (from Moshe Dayam to Yitzhak Rabin, from Yigal Allon to Ehud Barak, from Ariel Sharon to Yoni Netanyahu). The book analyses the weapons used by the Israeli forces, the defense industry, the activity of the Tzahal Special Forces which usually take place in counter-terrorist missions or operate behind enemy lines in deep cover, and last but not least, the evolution of Mossad or Aman and their missions;
- ”The Vanguard of the Caliphate – An intellectual history of jihadism”, (Litera Publishing, 2019) – An intricate history of radicalization in the Islamic society, from the beginning of the Islamic religion to a modern confusing ideology. This political theory essay takes you through the first ideas of the Islamic religion, the Islamic Revivalism in the 19th century, the Cold War, to the modern day radicalization. Focusing on the ideas of the great thinkers of the Islamic civilization, it explains the roots of today's jihadist groups and their actions.

As a political analyst, Ovidiu Raețchi wrote numerous editorials for Adevărul and Ziare.com.
