= Vlad Gheorghe =

Romanian politician (born 1985)

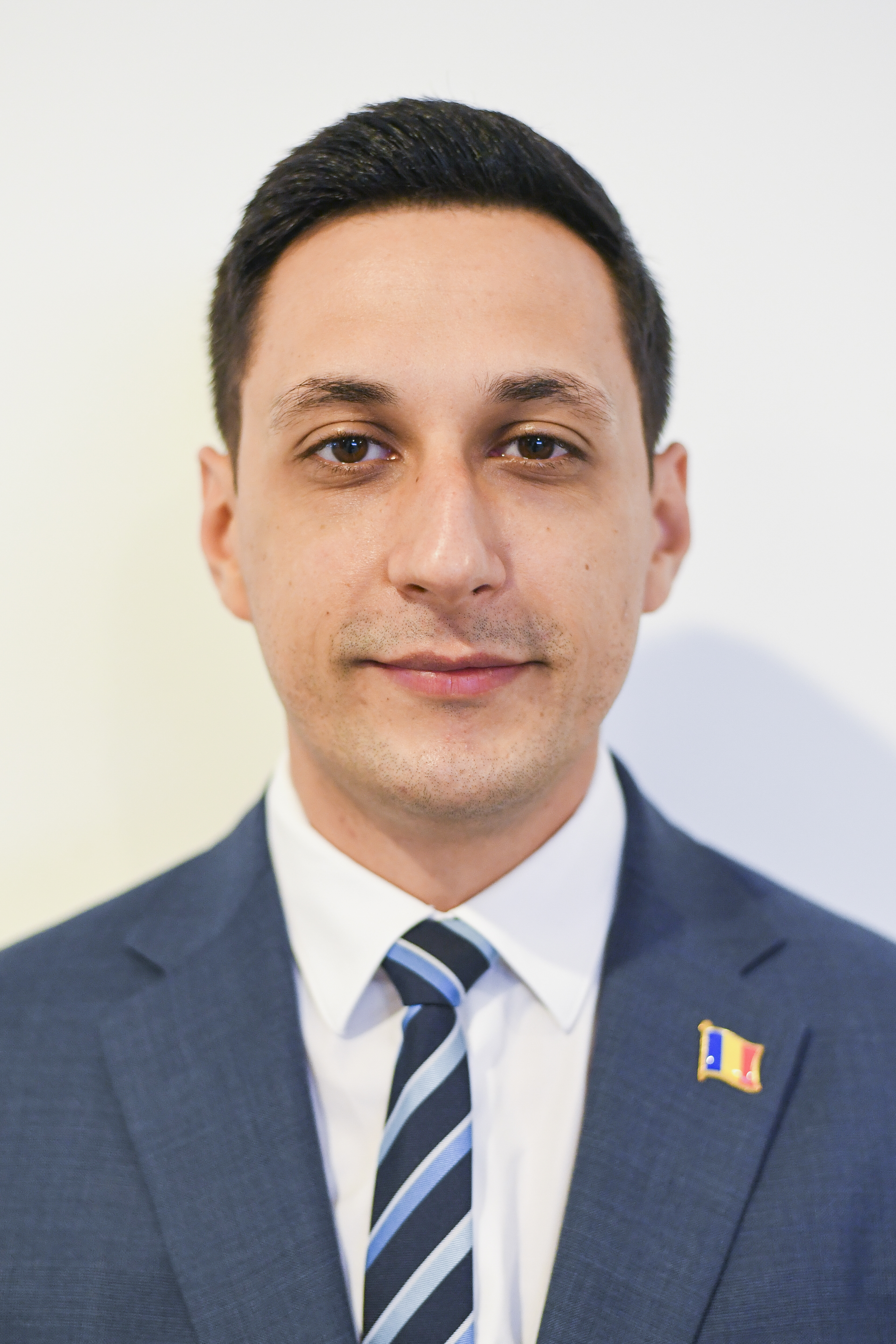

Member of the European Parliament
- In office 10 November 2020 – 15 July 2024

Personal details
- Born: Vlad Gheorghe; 22 February 1985 (age 41) Bucharest, Romania
- Party: DREPT (since 2024)
- Other political affiliations: Renew Europe (2019–2024) independent (2024)

Vlad Gheorghe (born 22 February 1985), is a Romanian politician, formerly a member of the European Parliament.

== Early life and education ==
Vlad Gheorghe was born 22 February 1985 in Bucharest, capital of the Socialist Republic of Romania into a Roma family.

Gheorghe was a lawyer specialised in administrative-fiscal law, European funds and public procurement. He has worked for over 8 years in NGOs and private companies running projects with European funds on infrastructure, environment and human resources. He came to public attention after being beaten by gendarmes on 10 August 2018 at the anti-government rally in Victoriei Square in Bucharest. He was one of the vocal protesters who demanded that the violence of the previous two years be investigated by prosecutors.

== Political career ==
In the 2019 elections, he ran for the European Parliament on the recommendation of the USR. He took over as a Member of Parliament in his ninth term on 10 November 2020, replacing Clotilde Armand after she resigned in order to take up her term as mayor of Sector 1.

In June 2023, Gheorghe was the joint recipient of the Promoting European Value Award, alongside fellow MEP Evin Incir at The Parliament Magazine's annual MEP Awards

On 13 June 2025, Gheorghe announced that he had been fined 15,000 lei by the Permanent Electoral Authority for expressing his support for Nicușor Dan during the 2025 Romanian presidential election, stating that he would challenge the fine in court.
