= Radu-Marcel Tuhuț =

Romanian politician

Member of the Chamber of Deputies
- Incumbent
- Assumed office December 2020
- Constituency: Alba, Romania

Personal details
- Born: January 20, 1970 (age 56)
- Party: Social Democratic Party

Radu-Marcel Tuhuț is a Romanian politician who is member of the Chamber of Deputies

== Biography ==
He was elected in 2020.
