= Daniel Toda =

Romanian politician (born 1982)

Member of the Chamber of Deputies
- Incumbent
- Assumed office 21 December 2020
- Constituency: Timiș

Personal details
- Born: 22 September 1982 (age 43)
- Party: DREPT (since 2024)
- Other political affiliations: REPER (2022–2024); USR (2020–2022); PLUS (until 2020)

Daniel-Liviu Toda (born 22 September 1982) is a Romanian politician of the Justice and Respect in Europe for All Party. Since 2020, he has been a member of the Chamber of Deputies. He was previously a member of the Freedom, Unity and Solidarity Party, the Save Romania Union and Renewing Romania's European Project, and joined the Justice and Respect in Europe for All Party in 2024.
