= Radu-Mihai Cristescu =

Romanian politician

Member of the Chamber of Deputies
- Incumbent
- Assumed office 21 December 2020
- Constituency: Satu-Mare

Personal details
- Born: January 30, 1968 (age 58)
- Party: Social Democratic Party

Radu-Mihai Cristescu is a Romanian politician who is member of the Chamber of Deputies

== Biography ==
He was elected in 2020.
