= Christine Thellmann =

Romanian politician (born 1986)

Member of the Chamber of Deputies

Personal details
- Born: 20 December 1986 (age 39)

Christine Thellmann (born 20 December 1986) is a Romanian politician. She was elected to the Chamber of Deputies in December 2020 at the 2020 Romanian legislative election.
