= Sebastian Suciu =

Romanian politician (born 1986)

Member of the Chamber of Deputies
- Incumbent
- Assumed office 21 December 2020
- Constituency: Sibiu

Personal details
- Born: 22 November 1986 (age 39) Sibiu, Socialist Republic of Romania
- Party: Alliance for the Union of Romanians
- Education: Lucian Blaga University of Sibiu
- Occupation: Dentist

Sebastian-Ilie Suciu (born 22 November 1986) is a Romanian politician of the Alliance for the Union of Romanians. Since 2020, he has been a member of the Chamber of Deputies. He is the leader of the Alliance for the Union of Romanians in Sibiu County, and was its candidate for mayor of Sibiu in 2024.

Born in Sibiu, Suciu he graduated from the Faculty of Medicine of Lucian Blaga University of Sibiu, specializing in dentistry.
