= Nosa, Serbia =

Nosa Nosza Носа
- Hamlet
- Location within Serbia
- Coordinates: 46.092622°N 19.857283°E
- Country: Serbia
- Province: Vojvodina

Population (2015)
  - Total: c.600
- Time zone: UTC+1 (CET)
  - Summer (DST): UTC+2 (CEST)

Nosa (in Serbian Cyrillic: Носа, in Hungarian: Nosza), is a small settlement (hamlet) in Serbia. It is situated in the Subotica municipality, North Bačka District, Vojvodina province.

== Geography ==
Officially, Nosa is not classified as a separate settlement, but as part of Hajdukovo, a suburban part of the city Subotica. It is located between the city agglomeration, and settlement Male Pijace, and situated right at the border with municipality Kanjiža, North Banat District.

What makes the status of Nosa special is that most of the settlement lies in Subotica, but one easternmost street in the municipality Kanjiža. Both Nosa and Hajdukovo are administered in cadaster Palić.

== Sources ==
- Vojvodina - auto karta, Magic Map, Smederevska Palanka, 2001.

== See also ==
- Subotica
- List of places in Serbia
- List of cities, towns and villages in Vojvodina
