= Mihai Mohaci =

Romanian politician

Mihai Mohaci (born 2 May 1957) is a Romanian politician who served as Senator of the Social Democratic Party, as well as Prefect of Brașov County.

He was named Prefect of Brașov in May 2012, before being replaced in March 2014 by Romer Ambrus, becoming his underprefect. On 23 December 2014 he became once again the county's prefect again, serving until March 2016.
