= Gheorghe Pecingină =

Romanian politician (born 1978)

Member of the Chamber of Deputies
- Incumbent
- Assumed office 21 December 2020
- Constituency: Gorj

Personal details
- Born: 28 August 1978 (age 47)
- Party: DREPT (since 2024)

Gheorghe Pecingină (born 28 August 1978) is a Romanian politician of the Justice and Respect in Europe for All Party. Since 2020, he has been a member of the Chamber of Deputies.

Pecingină was a member of the Democratic Liberal Party, the People's Party – Dan Diaconescu, the Social Democratic Party and the Alliance of Liberals and Democrats, and joined the National Liberal Party in 2016. Within the National Liberal Party, he served as vice president of its Gorj County branch. From January 2020 until his election to the Chamber of Deputies in December, he served as state secretary of the Ministry of Finance. In September 2024, he joined the Justice and Respect in Europe for All Party.
