= Sorin-Titus Muncaciu =

Romanian politician (born 1953)

Member of the Chamber of Deputies
- Incumbent
- Assumed office 21 December 2020
- Constituency: Galați

Personal details
- Born: 12 September 1953 (age 73) Costache Negri, Romania
- Citizenship: Romania, United States
- Education: Carol Davila University of Medicine and Pharmacy
- Occupation: Doctor and politician

Sorin-Titus Muncaciu (born 12 September 1953) is a Romanian politician who since 2020 has served a member of the Chamber of Deputies for the Alliance for the Union of Romanians (AUR).

== Education and professional training ==
Sorin-Titus Muncaciu was born 12 September 1953 in Costache Negri, Galați County in the Romanian People's Republic. He pursued a medical career, studying at the Carol Davila University of Medicine and Pharmacy and as the Gheorghe Lazăr National College, both located within the Romanian capital Bucharest. He later moved to the United States to studied at the Marymount University, a private Catholic university in Arlington County, Virginia. Muncaciu is a naturalised American citizen.

== Political career ==
=== Member of the Chamber of Deputies (2020–present) ===
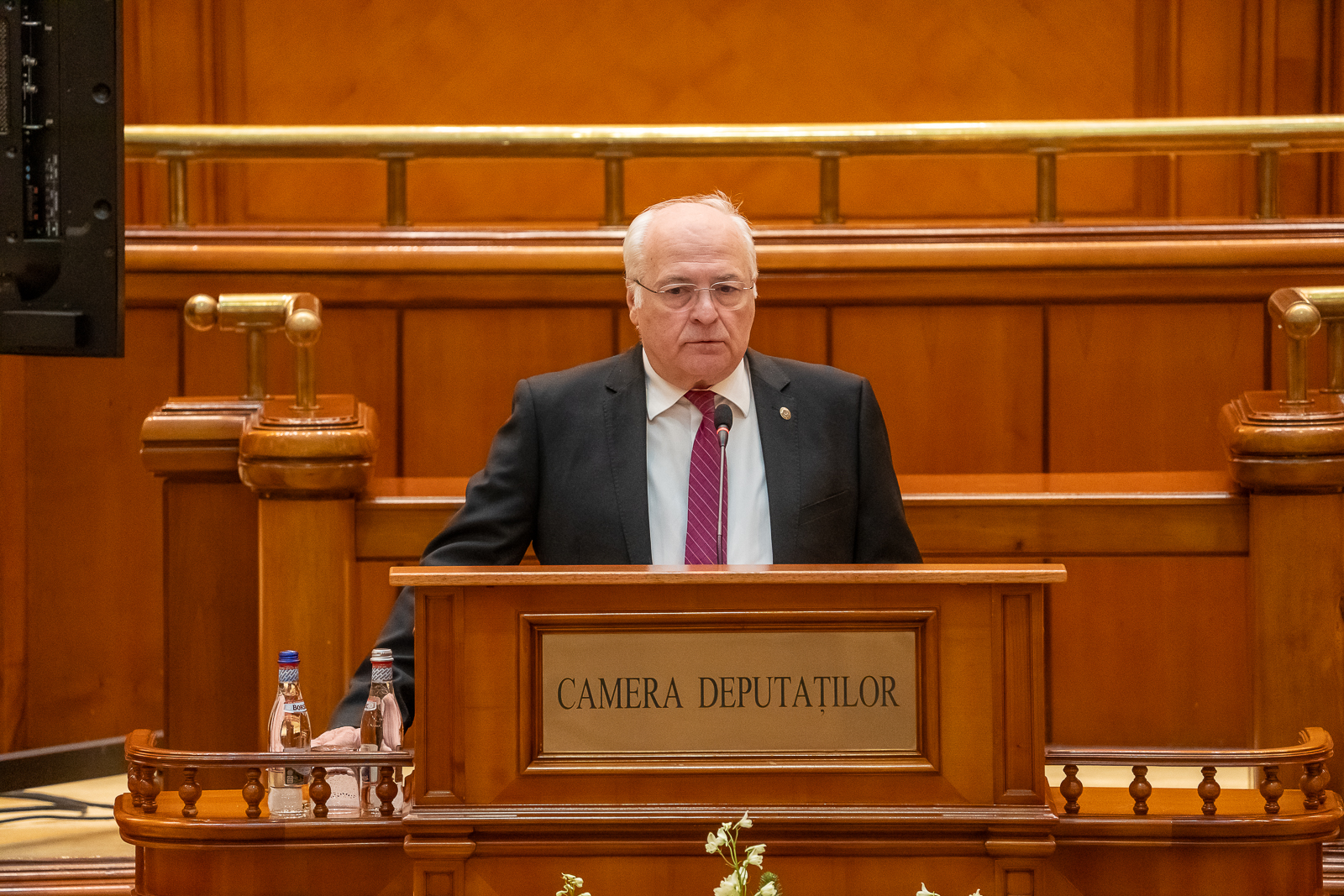
Muncaciu taking the oath of office on 21 December 2024

In the 2020 Romania parliamentary election on 6 December, Muncaciu was elected a member of the Chamber of Deputies for Galați County, taking office on 21 December. He was reelected deputy in the same constituency in the 2024 parliamentary election on 1 December of that year. Muncaciu is a member of the Parliamentary Assembly of the Council of Europe.
