= Monica Berescu =

Romanian politician (born 1987)

Member of the Chamber of Deputies
- Incumbent
- Assumed office 21 December 2020
- Constituency: Iași

Personal details
- Born: 21 May 1987 (age 39) Iași, Socialist Republic of Romania
- Party: USR (since 2021); PLUS (until 2021)
- Education: Alexandru Ioan Cuza University

Monica-Elena Berescu (born 21 May 1987) is a Romanian politician of the Save Romania Union. Since 2020, she has been a member of the Chamber of Deputies. From 2019 to 2021, she was the leader of the Freedom, Unity and Solidarity Party in Iași County. In 2021, she was proposed as minister of research, innovation and digitalisation in the rejected cabinet of Dacian Cioloș.
