= Brian Cristian =

Romanian politician (born 1990)

Member of the Chamber of Deputies
- Incumbent
- Assumed office 21 December 2020
- Constituency: Maramureș

Personal details
- Born: 14 June 1990 (age 35)
- Party: USR (since 2021); PLUS (until 2021)

Brian Cristian (born 14 June 1990) is a Romanian politician of the Save Romania Union. Since 2020, he has been a member of the Chamber of Deputies. In the 2024 local elections, he was the candidate of the United Right Alliance for mayor of Baia Mare.
