= Daniel-Sorin Gheba =

Romanian politician (born 1978)

Member of the Chamber of Deputies
- Incumbent
- Assumed office 21 December 2020
- Constituency: Dolj

Personal details
- Born: 31 January 1978 (age 48) Timișoara, Socialist Republic of Romania
- Other political affiliations: AUR (2023–2024); USR (2019–2023),,,,
- Education: University of Craiova

Daniel-Sorin Gheba (born 31 January 1978) is a Romanian politician. From 2020 to 2024, he was a member of the Chamber of Deputies.

Before entering politics, Gheba worked as a medical representative for a pharmaceutical company, despite holding a degree in mechanics from the University of Craiova.

Gheba joined the Save Romania Union (USR) party in 2019, after having participated in the 2017–2019 Romanian protests. He was elected member of the Chamber of Deputies in the 2020 parliamentary election, and switched to the Alliance for the Union of Romanians (AUR) in 2023. In 2024, he switched to the Social Democratic Party (PSD), and later to Justice and Respect in Europe for All Party (DREPT), from which he was excluded, with the leadership citing his frequent changes of political affiliation as the justification. He is currently a founding member of the Competent Romania Alliance (ARC)
