= Oana Murariu =

Romanian politician (born 1988)

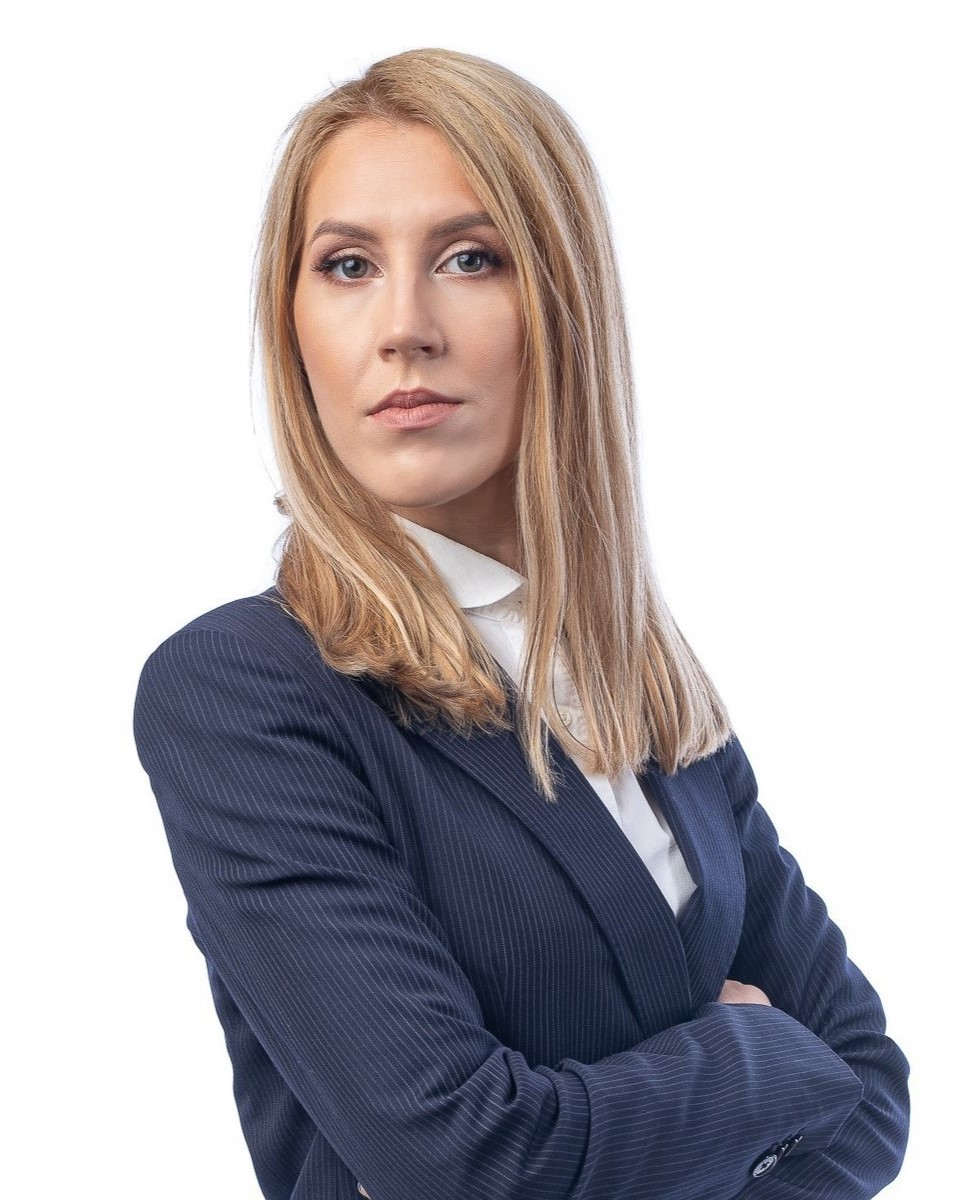
- Murariu in 2020

Member of the Chamber of Deputies
- Incumbent
- Assumed office 21 December 2020
- Constituency: Cluj

Personal details
- Born: 11 September 1988 (age 37)
- Party: Save Romania Union

Oana Murariu (born 11 September 1988) is a Romanian politician of the Save Romania Union. Since 2020, she has been a member of the Chamber of Deputies. In the first session, she was elected as one of the secretaries of the chamber. Since 2022, she has served as leader of the Save Romania Union in Cluj County.
