= Ion-Marian Lazăr =

Romanian politician (born 1978)

Member of the Chamber of Deputies
- Incumbent
- Assumed office 21 December 2020
- Constituency: Vâlcea

Personal details
- Born: 21 July 1978 (age 47)
- Party: DREPT (since 2024)
- Other political affiliations: USR (until 2024)

Ion-Marian Lazăr (born 21 July 1978) is a Romanian politician of the Justice and Respect in Europe for All Party. In the 2020 parliamentary election, he was elected member of the Chamber of Deputies, representing the Save Romania Union. In the 2024 local elections, he was the candidate of the Save Romania Union for mayor of Râmnicu Vâlcea. Since September 2024, he has been a member of the Justice and Respect in Europe for All Party.
