= Cristian-Paul Ichim =

Romanian politician (1975–2026)

Member of the Chamber of Deputies
- In office 21 December 2020 – 20 December 2024
- Constituency: Bacău

Personal details
- Born: 8 May 1975
- Died: 16 November 2026 (aged 51)
- Party: DREPT (since 2024)
- Other political affiliations: REPER (2022–2024); USR (2020–2022); PLUS (until 2020)

Cristian-Paul Ichim (8 May 1975 – 16 November 2026) was a Romanian politician of the Justice and Respect in Europe for All Party. In the 2020 parliamentary election, he was elected member of the Chamber of Deputies. He was a member of the Save Romania Union until 2022, when he switched to Renewing Romania's European Project. Since 2024, was a member of the Justice and Respect in Europe for All Party. Ichim died on 16 November 2026, aged 51.
