= Mara Calista =

Romanian politician (born 1988)

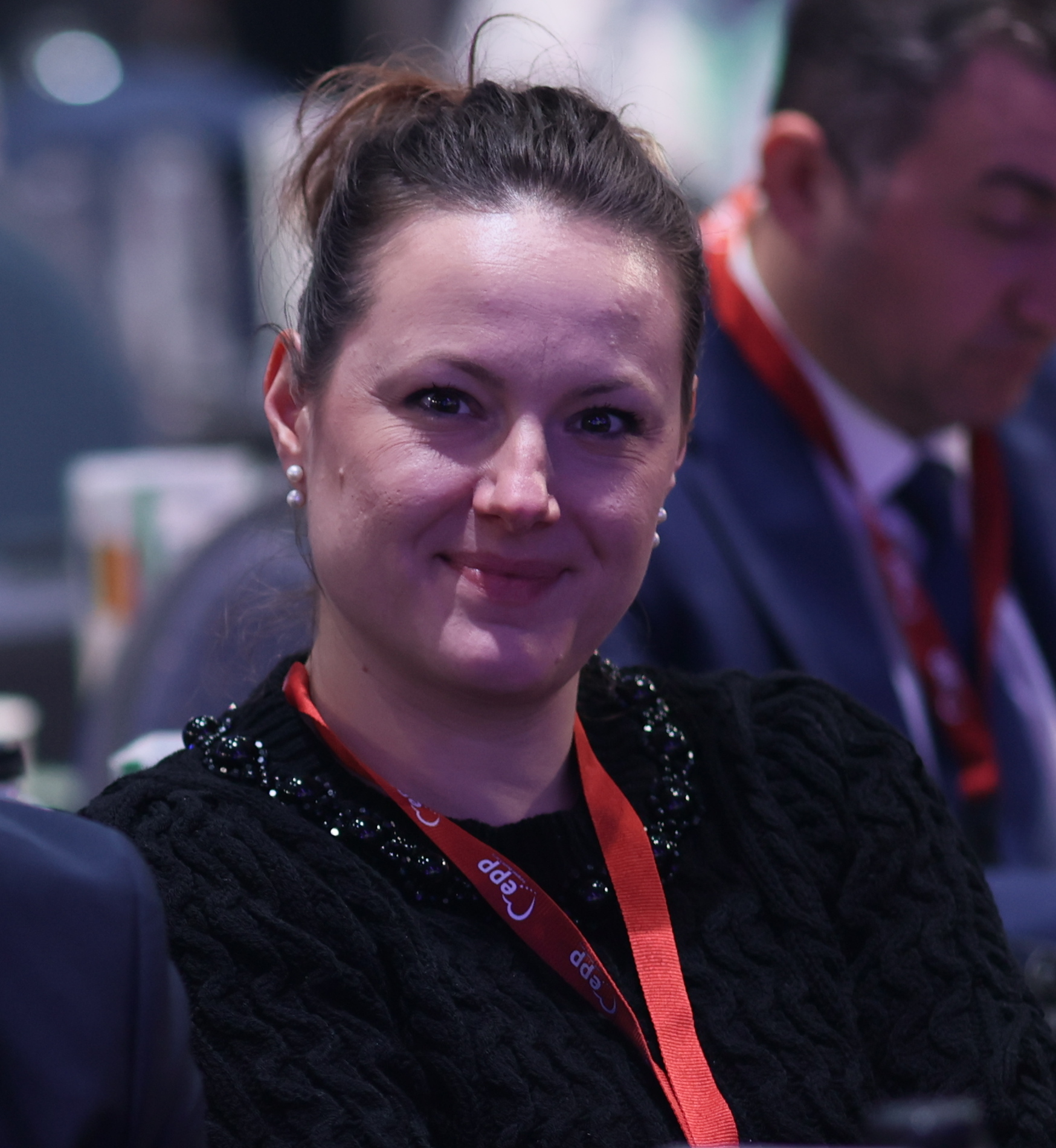
- Calista in 2024

Member of the Chamber of Deputies
- Incumbent
- Assumed office 21 December 2016
- Constituency: Teleorman (2016–2020); Neamț (2020–present)

Personal details
- Born: 9 October 1988 (age 37)
- Party: National Liberal Party

Mara-Daniela Calista (born 9 October 1988) is a Romanian politician of the National Liberal Party. Since 2016, she has been a member of the Chamber of Deputies. She previously worked as advisor to prime minister Dacian Cioloș.
