= Radu-Marin Moisin =

Romanian politician (born 1982)

Member of the Chamber of Deputies

Personal details
- Born: December 10, 1982 (age 43)
- Party: Partidul Naţional Liberal

Radu-Marin Moisin is a Romanian politician who is member of the Chamber of Deputies

== Biography ==
He was elected in 2020.
