= Vasile Nagy =

Romanian politician (born 1988)

Member of the Chamber of Deputies
- Incumbent
- Assumed office 21 December 2020
- Constituency: Arad

Personal details
- Born: 12 October 1988 (age 37)
- Party: FD (since 2023); AUR (until 2023)

Vasile Nagy (born 12 October 1988) is a Romanian politician of Force of the Right. He is an ethnic Hungarian. Since 2020, he has been a member of the Chamber of Deputies. He was elected as a member of the Alliance for the Union of Romanians, and joined Force of the Right in 2023.
