= Radu-Iulian Molnar =

Romanian politician (born 1982)

Member of the Chamber of Deputies
- In office 16 December 2020 – 20 December 2024
- Constituency: 13th district of Cluj

Personal details
- Born: August 21, 1982 (age 43)
- Party: Save Romania Union

Radu-Iulian Molnar is a Romanian software engineer, and former politician who was member of the Chamber of Deputies from 2020 to 2024.

He occasionally streams on Twitch.
