= Darius Pop =

Romanian politician (born 1994)

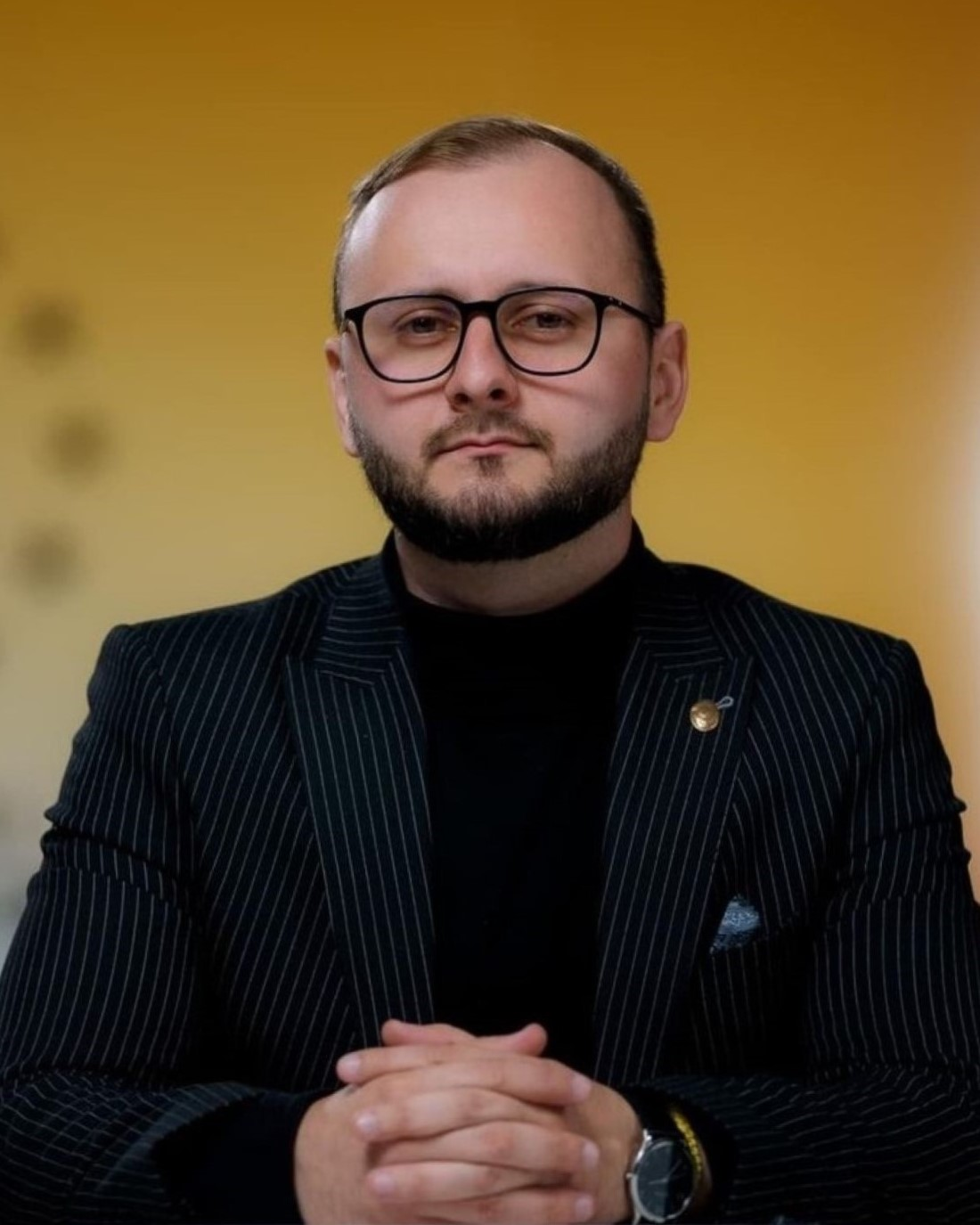
- Pop in 2023

Member of the Chamber of Deputies
- In office 21 December 2020 – 21 December 2024
- Constituency: Maramureș County

Personal details
- Born: 13 September 1994 (age 31)
- Party: Alliance for the Union of Romanians

Darius Pop (born 13 September 1994) is a Romanian politician who from 2020 to 2024 served as a member of the Chamber of Deputies for Alliance for the Union of Romanians.

He was elected member of the Chamber of Deputies in the 2020 parliamentary election. Since 2019, he has served as leader of the party in Maramureș County. In 2024, he was a candidate for president of the Maramureș County Council.
