= Cătălina Ciofu =

Romanian politician (born 1987)

Member of the Chamber of Deputies
- Incumbent
- Assumed office 21 December 2020
- Constituency: Bacău

Personal details
- Born: 13 September 1987 (age 38)
- Party: National Liberal Party

Cătălina Ciofu (born 13 September 1987) is a Romanian politician of the National Liberal Party. Since 2020, she has been a member of the Chamber of Deputies. She previously worked as a research assistant at Vasile Alecsandri University of Bacău.
