= Ciprian-Titi Stoica =

Romanian politician (born 1982)

Member of the Senate of Romania
- Incumbent
- Assumed office 21 December 2024

Member of the Chamber of Deputies
- In office 21 December 2020 – 21 December 2024

Personal details
- Born: 1 May 1982 (age 43) Timișoara, Romania
- Party: Alliance for the Union of Romanians
- Occupation: Politician • Bartender

Ciprian-Titi Stoica (born 1 May 1982) is a Romanian politician who from 2020 to 2024 served as member of the Chamber of Deputies and since 2024 has served as a member of the Senate for the Alliance for the Union of Romanians.

== Before entering politics ==
Ciprian-Titi Stoica was born on 1 May 1982 in Timișoara, capital of Timiș County, in the Socialist Republic of Romania. About his education, Stoica stated in 2020:

I completed primary school at the Pedagogical High School and continued with middle school at C.D. Loga. I did the first two years of high school at C.D. Loga, and then I transferred to the Sanitary High School, where I also graduated. I was enrolled in two university programmes: Social Work and Production and Transport Management. Due to financial reasons, in 2010 I decided to settle in the United Kingdom. I started from the bottom. At first, I worked as a barback, then as a bartender. I took a security guard course and became a security guard. I climbed the ranks until I became a kind of community support officer accredited by the Metropolitan Police

== Political career ==
=== Member of the Chamber of Deputies (2020–2024) ===
In the 2020 Romanian parliamentary election on 6 December, Stoica was elected a member of the Chamber of Deputies for the Alliance for the Union of Romanians (AUR) in his native Timiș County, taking office on 21 December 2020.

During a meeting in the Parliament's Rules Committee on 2 February 2022, Stoica referred to Ovidiu Ganț, deputy for the Democratic Forum of Germans in Romania (FDGR) as a "Nazi". Stoica justified his remark by stating that the methods used by the FDGR in the Rules Committee qualified as "Nazi", adding that "The German Democratic Forum is the legal successor of the German ethnic group that was condemned at the Nuremberg Tribunal and considered Nazi".

On 7 June 2023, news reports surfaced alleging that Stoica during the night had called several parliamentary colleagues from the Social Democrats (PSD), the National Liberals (PNL), and the Save Romania Union (USR), including PSD leader Marcel Ciolacu, while in a state of intoxication. Stoica had previously been sanctioned with a 50% reduction of his allowance for a period of six months for disruptive behaviour during the plenary sessions on 9 and 10 May of that year.

Stoica commented that he had not been intoxicated but had instead suffered to a throat infection, rejecting the claims of his party chairman George Simion that he suffered to alcoholism. Stoica apologised to PSD deputy Gheorghe Șoldan and declared "I will confess to my duhovnic [confessor]". On the same day, Simion announced that Stoica would be expelled from the AUR. On 1 September, Stoica explained to Romanian newspaper Adevărul that he was still a member of the AUR, as his expulsion had as of then not been certified by the AUR National Leadership Council.

=== Member of the Senate (2024–present) ===
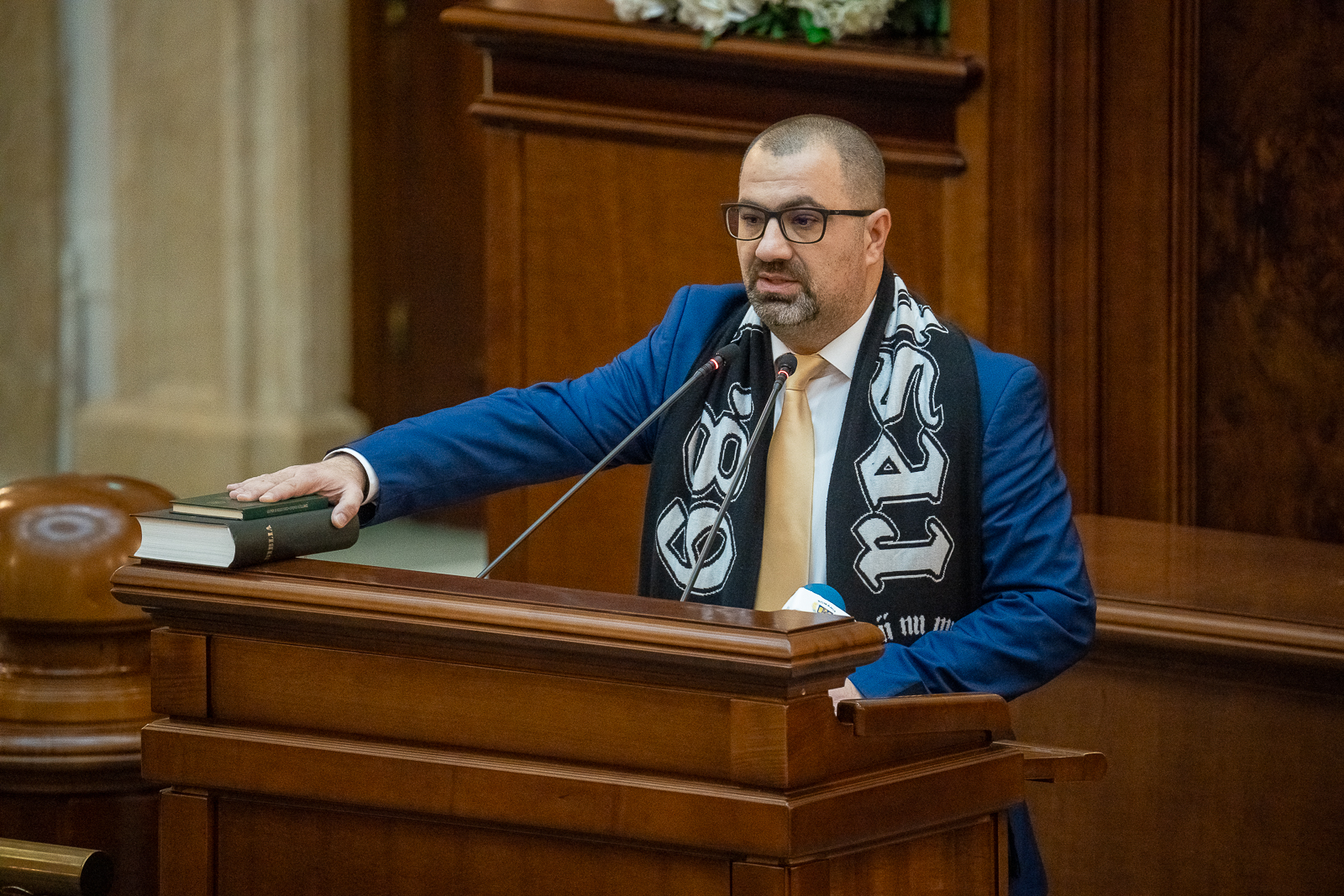
Stoica taking the oath of office in the Senate, 21 December 2024

In the 2024 Romanian parliamentary election on 1 December, Stoica was elected a member of the Romanian Senate for the AUR in the same constituency he has served as deputy, taking office on 21 December 2024. As a senator, he is a member of the Committee on European Affairs, as well as the Committee for the Investigation of Abuses, Combating Corruption, and Petitions. In addition, since 25 March 2025, Stoica has served as a member of the parliamentary friendship groups for Ireland, Latvia, and Hungary. On 22 May 2025, Stoica made unsubstantiated claims of election fraud during the 2025 Romanian presidential election earlier that month, in which Nicușor Dan had defeated Simion 53.6–46.4% in the runoff on 18 May.

== Private life ==
Stoica is married and has a child.
