= Radu Tudor Ciornei =

Romanian politician (born 1971)

Member of the Chamber of Deputies
- Incumbent
- Assumed office 21 December 2020
- Constituency: Suceava

Personal details
- Born: 30 September 1971 (age 54)
- Party: DREPT (since 2024); Save Romania Union (until 2024)

Radu Tudor Ciornei (born 30 September 1971) is a Romanian politician of the Justice and Respect in Europe for All Party. Since 2020, he has been a member of the Chamber of Deputies. He was previously a member of the Save Romania Union, and was elected as a vice president of its Suceava County branch in 2021. He joined the Justice and Respect in Europe for All Party in 2024.
