= Miron Mitrea =

Romanian engineer and politician

Miron Tudor Mitrea (born August 8, 1956) is a Romanian engineer and politician. A member of the Social Democratic Party (PSD), he was a member of the Romanian Chamber of Deputies for Vrancea County from 1996 to 2008, and sat in the Romanian Senate from 2008 to 2012, representing the same county. In 2012, he returned for a final term to the Chamber, also for Vrancea County. In the Adrian Năstase cabinet, he was Minister of Public Works and Transport from 2000 to 2004.

He has four sons and a daughter. His third and current wife, Manuela, a notary by profession, was a member of the Chamber of Deputies from 2000 to 2016.

== Biography ==
He was born in Sighișoara to Ion and Viorica Mitrea and, after living in Făgăraș and Brașov, moved to Bucharest, where he completed secondary studies at the city's Dr. Petru Groza High School. In 1988, after his father’s death, his mother fled to West Germany. His maternal grandfather, Miron Neagu, was a member of the Romanian National Party; his maternal grandmother, Gabriela Waldhofer, was Austrian. His father was from Leordeni, Argeș County. Following army service in Medgidia, he studied transportation at the Politehnica University of Bucharest, specialising in road vehicles and graduating in 1981. From 1982 to 1983 he worked at a heavy machine factory in Constanța, and then until 1989 he held a similar position in Bucharest, where he was a director at a factory.

Following the 1989 Revolution, Mitrea became president of the trade union Frăția, and after Frăția merged with another union in 1993, he continued until 1995 as head of the National Confederation of Free Trade Unions of Romania – Brotherhood. He headed the short-lived Party of Social Solidarity from 1993 to 1994. Subsequently joining the PDSR (PSD from 2001), he was elected to the Chamber on its lists in 1996. In 2000, after the PDSR came to power, Mitrea became Minister of Transport, serving until 2004, when the party lost elections. As minister, his achievements included modernising several rail stations, continuing work on the A2 motorway, rebuilding the northern jetty of the Port of Constanța, and completing Bucharest apartment blocks that had been left unfinished since 1989. In April 2008, the National Anticorruption Directorate charged him with receiving bribes, instigating forgery in official documents, and using forgery as minister, and Mitrea resigned his Chamber seat that September after his colleagues (despite his request to the contrary) stopped the indictment (and a similar one for Năstase) from moving forward on grounds of parliamentary immunity; he wished to fight the charges and clear his name. After serving as the coordinator of the PSD's successful 2008 election campaign, Mitrea won a seat in the Senate. At the 2012 election, he returned to the Chamber as one of its vice presidents and a member of its European affairs committee. In October 2014, Mitrea received a two-year prison sentence in a corruption case involving construction at his mother's house; in response, he vowed to appeal. His sentence was upheld the following February, when he was incarcerated at Poarta Albă, at which point he resigned from the Chamber. He was freed in May 2016.

Within his party, Mitrea has served as Vice President (1995-1996 and 2001-2005), Secretary General (1996-1997 and 2005-2006) and member of the General Executive Bureau (1997-2000). From 1996 to 2000, he was a vice president, quaestor, and secretary of the Chamber of Deputies, also serving as a vice president from 2004 to 2008. From 1991 to 1992, he served on the executive bureau of the International Confederation of Free Trade Unions. In 2002, President Ion Iliescu awarded him the Order of the Star of Romania, knight class; this was withdrawn in 2019, as a result of his conviction. Ideologically, Mitrea is an avowed leftist but also an anti-communist, and he has worked to distance the PSD from its image as a successor to the Romanian Communist Party.

== See also ==
- List of corruption scandals in Romania
