= Liviu-Ioan Balint =

Romanian politician (born 1971)

Member of the Chamber of Deputies
- Incumbent
- Assumed office 21 December 2016
- Constituency: Sălaj (2016–2020); Dâmbovița (2020–present)

Personal details
- Born: 7 October 1971 (age 54)
- Party: DREPT (since 2024)

Liviu-Ioan "Como" Balint (born 7 October 1971) is a Romanian politician of the Justice and Respect in Europe for All Party. Since 2016, he has been a member of the Chamber of Deputies.

Balint joined the Democratic Party in 2000. He served as first vice president of the Democratic Liberal Party in Sălaj from 2004 to 2009, as vice president of the National Union for the Progress of Romania in Sălaj from 2010 to 2016, and as interim president of the People's Movement Party in Sălaj in 2016. In the 2016 parliamentary election, he was elected to the Chamber of Deputies as a candidate of the People's Movement Party. He switched to the Social Democratic Party in 2017, and later PRO Romania in 2019 and the National Liberal Party in 2020. Since 2024, he has been a member of the Justice and Respect in Europe for All Party.
