= Alexandra Presură =

Romanian politician

Member of the Chamber of Deputies
- Incumbent
- Assumed office 21 December 2016
- Constituency: Dolj

Personal details
- Born: September 16, 1984 (age 41)
- Party: Partidul Social Democrat

Alexandra Presură is a Romanian politician who is member of the Chamber of Deputies.

== Biography ==
She was elected in 2016.
