= Alexandra Huțu =

Romanian politician (born 1988)

Member of the Chamber of Deputies
- Incumbent
- Assumed office 1 February 2021
- Preceded by: Constantin-Neculai Pătrăuceanu
- Constituency: Botoșani

Personal details
- Born: 9 September 1988 (age 37)
- Party: Social Democratic Party

Alexandra Huțu (born 9 September 1988) is a Romanian politician of the Social Democratic Party. She has been a member of the Chamber of Deputies since 2021, when she replaced Constantin-Neculai Pătrăuceanu upon his resignation. She previously served as public administrator of Botoșani County, and as director of the chancellery of prefect Dan Șlincu.
