= Silviu Dehelean =

Romanian politician

Member of the Chamber of Deputies
- Incumbent
- Assumed office 2020

Personal details
- Born: December 4, 1979 (age 46)
- Party: Save Romania Union

Silviu Dehelean is a Romanian politician who is member of the Chamber of Deputies.

== Biography ==
He was elected in 2020.
