= Iuliu Nosa =

Romanian politician

Mayor of Zalău
- In office 2000–2004
- Preceded by: Petru Durcău
- Succeeded by: Radu Căpîlnăşiu

Member of the Chamber of Deputies of Romania
- Incumbent
- Assumed office 2004

Personal details
- Born: September 25, 1956 (age 70) Hida
- Party: Social Democrat Party (Romania)
- Education: Technical University of Cluj-Napoca

Iuliu Nosa (born September 25, 1956) is a politician from Romania. He served as the Mayor of Zalău, and as a member of the Chamber of Deputies of Romania.
