= Mihai-Cătălin Botez =

Romanian politician

Member of the Chamber of Deputies
- Incumbent
- Assumed office 21 December 2020
- Constituency: Vaslui 39th district

Personal details
- Born: March 29, 1986 (age 40)
- Party: Union to Save Romania

Mihai-Cătălin Botez is a Romanian politician who is a member of the Chamber of Deputies.

== Biography ==
He was elected in 2016.
