= Norbert Apjok =

Romanian politician (born 1989)

Member of the Chamber of Deputies
- Incumbent
- Assumed office 21 December 2016
- Constituency: Maramureș

Personal details
- Born: 19 October 1989 (age 36)
- Party: DREPT (since 2024); UDMR (until 2021)

Norbert Apjok (born 19 October 1989) is a Romanian politician of the Justice and Respect in Europe for All Party. Since 2016, he has been a member of the Chamber of Deputies. He was a member of Democratic Alliance of Hungarians in Romania until his expulsion in 2021, and served as vice president of its youth wing in Baia Mare.
