= Daniel Florea (politician) =

Romanian lawyer and politician

Daniel Florea (born September 19, 1972) is a Romanian lawyer and politician who served as the mayor of Bucharest's Sector 5. A member of the Social Democratic Party (PSD) and former member of the Democratic Party (PD), he has represented Călărași County in the Chamber of Deputies since 2012.

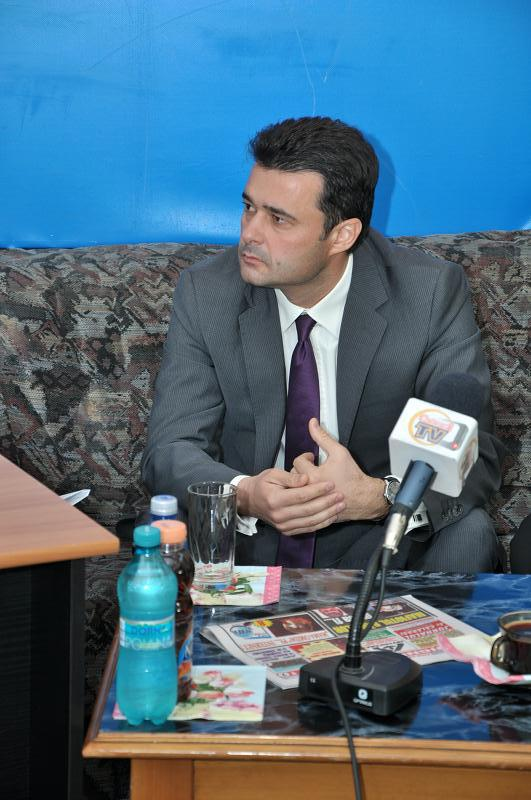
Daniel Florea attending a television show in 2012

== Early life and education ==
Born in Călărași, he graduated from Nicolae Bălcescu High School (now Barbu Știrbei National College). He then attended the Faculty of Law at the University of Bucharest from which he graduated in 1995 with the essay "Organized crime - a transnational phenomenon - and its impact on Romanian society".

He has attended post-university courses and holds degrees in various other fields: political studies, marketing and management of naval transportation operations, banking and stock markets, national security studies and diplomacy.

== Early career ==
From 1995 to 1997 he was a criminal law judge at the Constanța court. He left his position in 1997, in order to become a lawyer, coordinator of a private law office and legal Adviser for C.N.M. Romline Constanța, a Romanian state-owned naval transportation company.

From 1999 to 2003 he once again held the position of judge at the Constanța court, specialized in civil law. In 2003 he became a lawyer, partner and coordinator of "Margarit, Florov and partners" private law office, position which he held until 2005.

From April, 2005 to September, 2008 he held management positions in the Autoritatea pentru Valorificarea Activelor Statului (AVAS - the Romanian agency in charge of management of state-owned assets), and from August, 2008 to September, 2009 he held the position of lawyer and partner of "Stefanica and Florea" private law office.

In 2009 he returned to Romanian public administration, where he was named as a personal Adviser for the Romanian minister of Transportation and Infrastructure and then vice-president of AVAS, position which he held until his resignation, at the end of 2011.

As of 2012, Daniel Florea holds the position of lawyer, partner and coordinator of "Daniel Florea and partners" private law office.

== Political career ==
At the end of 2012, he was elected to the Chamber of Deputies, having won his constituency in the county of Călărași by a landslide. He became the only representative of the PSD in Călărași County for the 2012–2016 legislature.

He was a member of the Committee for Legal Matters, Discipline, and Immunities of the Romanian Chamber of Deputies, a member of the Joint Parliamentary Committee for the Review of the Romanian Constitution and also a member of the Parliamentary Assembly of the Council of Europe.

In June 2016, he was elected mayor of Bucharest's Sector 5, defeating incumbent Marian Vanghelie.
