= Dorel-Gheorghe Acatrinei =

Romanian politician (born 1977)

Member of the Chamber of Deputies
- Incumbent
- Assumed office 21 December 2020

Personal details
- Born: 18 April 1977 (age 48)

Dorel-Gheorghe Acatrinei (born 18 April 1977) is a Romanian politician. He was elected to the Chamber of Deputies in December 2020.
