= Ionel Floroiu =

Romanian politician (born 1962)

Member of the Chamber of Deputies

Personal details
- Born: 14 November 1962 (age 63)

Ionel Floroiu (born 14 November 1962) is a Romanian politician. He was elected to the Chamber of Deputies in December 2016 and again in December 2020.
