= Balsareny =

- Municipality
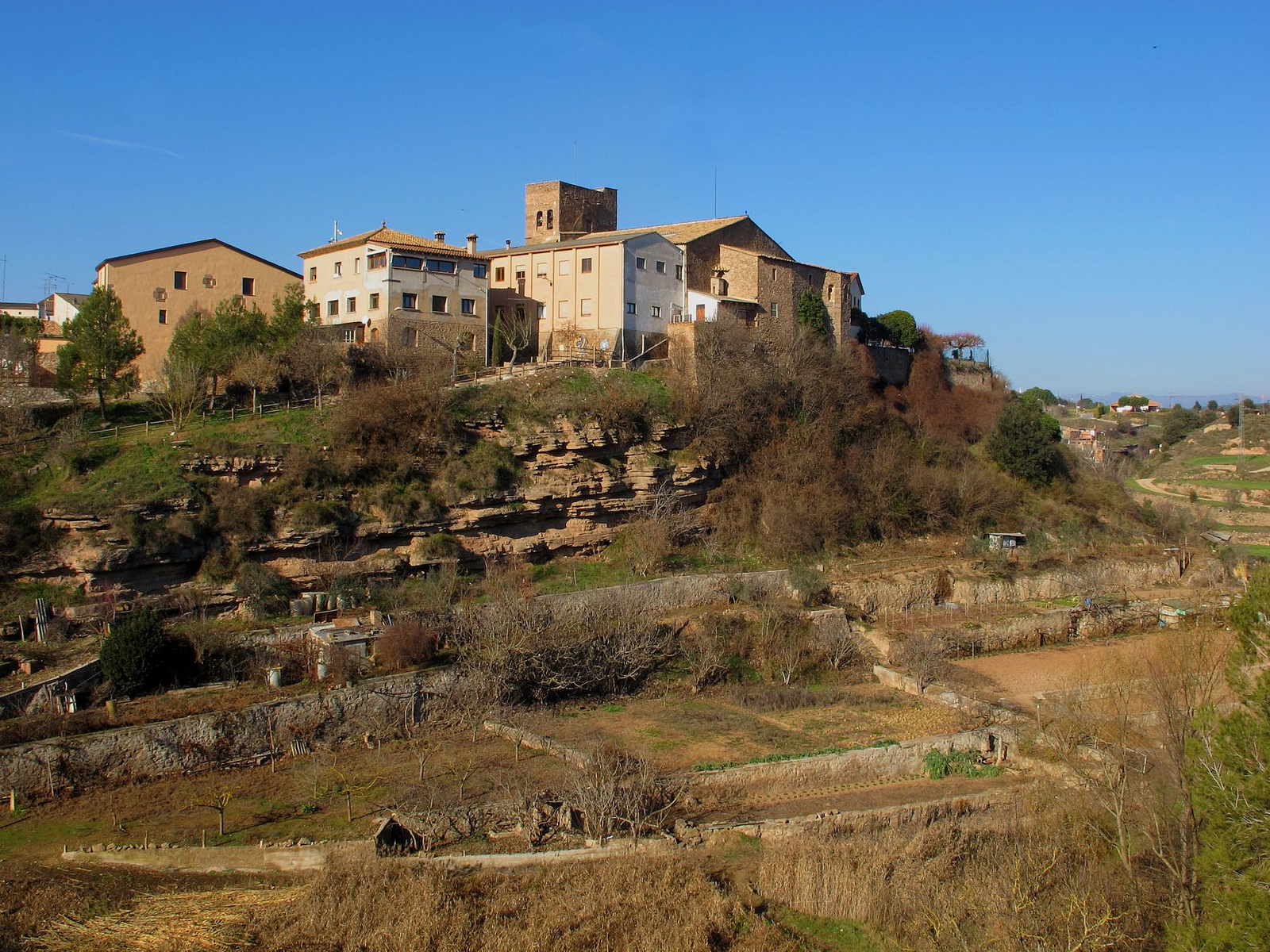
- The village on its sandy escarpment

- Coat of arms

- Location in Catalonia Balsareny (Spain)
- Coordinates: 41°51′57″N 1°52′37″E
- Country: Spain
- Community: Catalonia
- Province: Barcelona
- Comarca: Bages

Government
  - Mayor: Glòria Casaldàliga Riera (2023)

Area
  - Total: 36.9 km^{2} (14.2 sq mi)

Population (2025-01-01)
  - Total: 3,380
  - Density: 91.6/km^{2} (237/sq mi)
- Website: balsareny.cat

Balsareny (Catalan pronunciation: [bəlsəˈɾɛɲ]) is a municipality in the North of the comarca of Bages in the province of Barcelona, Catalonia, Spain. It is situated in the valley of the river Llobregat, with its typical forests of Aleppo pines. It is connected by road (BP-4313) with Súria and Avinyó.

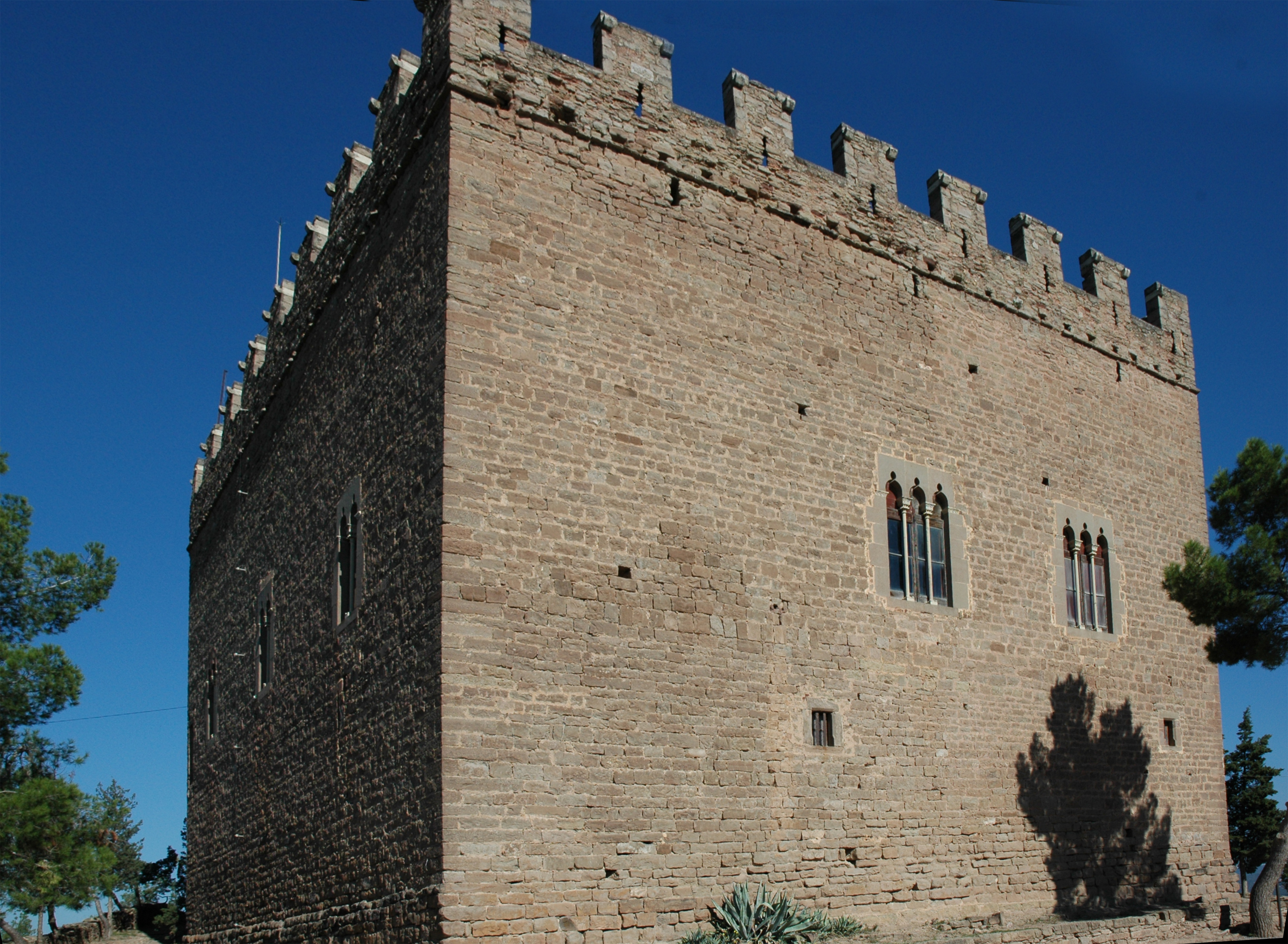
Balsareny Castle

The name is thought to be derived from the Catalan words balç (escarpment) and areny (sand); the castle and the village have their origins on an escarpment in a sandy plane. The first written mention of the settlement (as pago bazarenensi) dates from 966.

The village developed around the castle, which was built at a strategic point at the confluence of the river Mujal with the Llobregat, but most people lived in dispersed masias (farms). At the end of the 16th century, Baron Ferran Oliver sold some land around the castle and three streets were created: Carrer Vell (Old Street, nowadays Àngel Guimerà), Carrer Nou (New Street) and Carrer de la Creu (Cross street). A sanctuary dedicated to Mary is documented since 1009. The romanesque Church of St. Mary dates from late 13th century, but the building has undergone many transformations since then. The town was walled, but with the increase of population, new streets were added outside the walls.

In the 19th century the walls were demolished and the roads were improved. Along with the Manresa-Berga railway (1885, closed down 1973), this contributed toward a flourishing textile industry, though this has now almost disappeared. In 1945 the extraction of the rich layers of potassium salts (sylvite and carnallite) started, and today this remains a major employer, but many other small and medium enterprises have also been created. There is also one of the major European production plants from Gates Corporation, an American manufacturer of power transmission belts and fluid power, employing about 240 people.

On 7 August 1963 the guerrilla leader Ramon Vila Capdevila - the last of the Spanish Maquis to hold out since the end of the Spanish Civil War - was killed by Guardia Civil officers near a castle in Balsareny.

== Demography ==
According to Spanish census data, this is the population of Balsareny in recent years.

1981	1991	2001	2011
3,624	3,405	3,195	3,484
