= 2020 Bacău County local elections =

2020 elections held in Bacău County

- 27 September 2020
- Turnout: 41.55%

	First party	Second party
Party	PSD	PNL-USR-PLUS
Seats before	17	11
Seats won	17	11
Seat change	Steady	Steady
Popular vote	96,420	61,621
Percentage	42.25%	27.00%
	Third party	Fourth party
Party	PMP	PRO Romania
Seats before	0	-
Seats won	3	3
Seat change	▲3	New
Popular vote	16,525	15,297
Percentage	7.24%	6.70
President before election
Sorin Braşoveanu
PSD
Elected President
Valentin Ivancea
PSD

The 2020 Bacău County local elections took place on 27 September. A total of 8,310 candidates ran for various local positions, such as local councilors, mayors, county councilors and the President of the County Council.

== County Council elections ==
President of the County Council
Party	Candidate	Votes	Votes %
Social Democratic Party	Valentin Ivancea	94,669	41,03
National Liberal Party	Ionel Palăr	70,151	30.40
People's Movement Party	Valerian Vreme	16,352	7.09
PRO Romania	Aurelia Țaga	15,114	6.55
Alliance of Liberals and Democrats	Maricica-Luminița Coșa	11,033	4.78
USR-PLUS Alliance	Ion Pascaru	9,409	4.08
Green Party	Maria Munteanu	5,685	2.46
Alliance for the Union of Romanians	Mihai Iftime	5,682	2.46
Christian Democratic National Peasants' Party	Constantin Negru	2,636	1.14
Total		230,731	100

Composition of the County Council
Party	Votes	Votes %	Seats	Change
Social Democratic Party	96,420	42.25	17	Steady
PNL-USR-PLUS Alliance	61,621	27.00	11	Steady
People's Movement Party	16,525	7.24	3	▲3
PRO Romania	15,297	6.70	3	New
Alliance of Liberals and Democrats	14,925	6.54	2	▼3
Others	23,424	10.26	0	▼4
Total	228,212	100	36	N/A

== Local councils elections ==
Composition of the local councils
Party	Votes	Votes %	Seats
Social Democratic Party	78,817	33.42	607
National Liberal Party	54,000	22.90	389
Save Romania Union	10,619	4.50	73
People's Movement Party	16,480	6.99	71
PRO Romania	16,829	7.14	61
Alliance of Liberals and Democrats	6,971	2.96	23
PNL-USR-PLUS Alliance	20,950	8.88	16
Ecologist Party of Romania	6,851	2.91	9
Democratic Alliance of Hungarians in Romania	1,186	0.50	6
Freedom, Unity and Solidarity Party	1,135	0.48	6
Others	21,975	9.32	21
Total	235,813	100	1,282

== Mayoral elections ==
Mayoral elections by party
Party	Mayors
Social Democratic Party	63
National Liberal Party	26
People's Movement Party	2
PNL-USR-PLUS Alliance	1
Democratic Alliance of Hungarians in Romania	1
Total	93
