= 2020 Maramureș County local elections =

- 27 September 2020
- Turnout: 45.82%

	First party	Second party
Party	PNL	Coalition for Maramureș
Seats before	9	14
Seats won	13	10
Seat change	▲4	▼4
Popular vote	58,708	46,197
Percentage	31.94%	25.14%
	Third party	Fourth party
Party	PMP	USR PLUS
Seats before	3	-
Seats won	5	3
Seat change	▲2	New
Popular vote	21,288	14,143
Percentage	11.58%	7.69%
President before election
Gabriel Zetea
PSD
Elected President
Ionel Ovidiu
PNL

The 2020 local elections in Maramureș County were held on 27 September. A total of 7,233 candidates participated in the elections for various local offices, including local councilors, mayors, county councilors and the President of the County Council.

== County Council elections ==
President of the County Council
Party	Candidate	Votes	Votes %
National Liberal Party	Ionel Ovidiu	64,264	34.79
Coalition for Maramureș	Gabriel Zetea	59,193	32.04
People's Movement Party	Romeo Dobocan	18,341	9.93
USR-PLUS Alliance	Vlad Durus	14,734	7.98
PRO Romania	Viorica Marincaș	8,665	4.69
Ecologist Party of Romania	Mircea Ciocan	5,549	3.00
Independent Social Democratic Party	Bogdan Aiecoboaie	5,107	2.77
Alliance of Liberals and Democrats	Negruț Cornelia	3,569	1.93
Green Party	Valeriu Lascu	2,698	1.46
Greater Romania Party	Nistor Lihet	2,609	1.41
Total		184,729	100

Party composition of the County Council
Party	Votes	Votes %	Seats	Change
National Liberal Party	58,708	31.94	13	▲4
Coalition for Maramureș	46,197	25.14	10	▼4
People's Movement Party	21,288	11.58	5	▲2
USR-PLUS Alliance	14,143	7.69	3	New
PRO Romania	10,727	5.84	3	New
Others	32,732	17.81	0	▼9
Total	183,795	100	34	N/A

== Local councils elections ==
Party composition of the local councils
Party	Votes	Votes %	Seats
National Liberal Party	55,660	29.77	315
Coalition for Maramureș	46,323	24.78	249
People's Movement Party	24,806	13.27	149
Save Romania Union	8,157	4.36	56
PRO Romania	9,298	4.97	45
Alliance of Liberals and Democrats	5,294	2.83	28
Democratic Alliance of Hungarians in Romania	7,523	4.02	28
Ecologist Party of Romania	4,690	2.51	24
USR-PLUS Alliance	9,318	4.98	21
Union of the Ukrainians of Romania	2,222	1.19	19
Green Party	2,819	1.51	6
Greater Romania Party	1,456	0.78	5
Freedom, Unity and Solidarity Party	1,143	0.61	5
Independent	3,473	1.86	5
Others	4,784	2.56	13
Total	186,966	100	968

== Mayoral elections ==
Results of mayoral elections in Maramureș County by party
Party	Votes	Votes %	Mayors
Coalition for Maramureș	69,107	36.46	36
National Liberal Party	63,949	33.74	25
People's Movement Party	19,903	10.50	5
Independent	7,142	3.77	4
Save Romania Union	6,669	3.52	4
Union of the Ukrainians of Romania	1,030	0.54	1
Democratic Alliance of Hungarians in Romania	649	0.34	1
Others	21,083	11.13	0
Total	189,532	100	76
