= 2020 Cluj County local elections =

- 27 September 2020
- Turnout: 42.65%

	First party	Second party
Party	PNL	PSD
Seats before	18	12
Seats won	19	5
Seat change	▲1	▼7
Popular vote	117,516	33,632
Percentage	46.54%	13.32%
	Third party	Fourth party
Party	USR PLUS	UDMR
Seats before	-	7
Seats won	5	5
Seat change	New	▼2
Popular vote	30,701	29,154
Percentage	12.16%	11.55%
President before election
Alin Tișe
PNL
Elected President
Alin Tișe
PNL

In Cluj County, 2020 local elections were held on 27 September. A total of 7,042 candidates took part in the races for a range of local positions, including county president and councilors, local councilors and mayors.

== County Council results ==
President of County Council
Party	Candidate	Votes	Votes %
National Liberal Party	Alin Tișe	127,251	50.45
USR-PLUS Alliance	Cătălin Sălăgean	32,355	12.83
Social Democratic Party	Alexandru Cordoș	30,808	12.21
Democratic Alliance of Hungarians in Romania	István Vákár	28,566	11.33
People's Movement Party	Vasile Lungu	10,740	4.26
PRO Romania	Remus Lăpușan	9,420	3.73
Green Party	Bogdan Costea	6,057	2.40
Alliance for the Union of Romanians	Alexandru Curea	2,891	1.15
Greater Romania Party	Marius Bărdaș	2,186	0.87
National Force Party	Narcis Benche	1,934	0.77
Total		252,208	100

County Councilors
Party	Votes	Votes %	Seats	Change
National Liberal Party	117,516	46.54	19	▲1
Social Democratic Party	33,632	13.32	5	▼7
USR-PLUS Alliance	30,701	12.16	5	New
Democratic Alliance of Hungarians in Romania	29,154	11.55	5	▼2
People's Movement Party	12,893	5.11	2	▲2
Others	28,608	11.33	0	Steady
Total	252,504	100	36	N/A

== Local councils results ==
Local councilors
Party	Votes	Votes %	Seats
National Liberal Party	114,586	44.87	422
Social Democratic Party	32,583	12.76	181
Democratic Alliance of Hungarians in Romania	28,222	11.05	123
People's Movement Party	13,592	5.32	68
PRO Romania	10,819	4.24	60
USR-PLUS Alliance	30,839	12.07	54
Alliance of Liberals and Democrats	4,744	1.86	16
Green Party	3,910	1.53	12
Party of the Roma	2,555	1.00	11
Independent	4,014	1.57	8
Hungarian Alliance of Transylvania	615	0.24	5
Others	8,912	3.49	13
Total	255,391	100	973

== Mayor elections results ==
Mayors of Cluj County by party
Party	Mayors
National Liberal Party	51
Social Democratic Party	11
Democratic Alliance of Hungarians in Romania	9
Independent	4
People's Movement Party	3
USR-PLUS Alliance	1
Green Party	1
Alliance of Liberals and Democrats	1
Total	81
