= 2020 Prahova County local elections =

- 27 September 2020
- Turnout: 35.88%

	First party	Second party
Party	PNL USR PLUS Alliance	Alliance for Prahova
Seats before	15	16
Seats won	17	11
Seat change	▲2	▼5
Popular vote	131,179	90,442
Percentage	45.82%	31.59%
	Third party	Fourth party
Party	PMP	ALDE
Seats before	2	4
Seats won	3	3
Seat change	▲1	▼1
Popular vote	26,891	20,299
Percentage	9.39%	7.09%
President before election
Bogdan Toader
PSD
Elected President
Iulian Dumitrescu
PNL

The 2020 Prahova County local elections were held on 27 September. A total of 8,098 candidates participated in the elections for a range of local positions, including local councilors, mayors, county councilors and the President of the County Council.

For this election season in Prahova, National Liberal Party formed an alliance with USR PLUS. Similarly, the Social Democratic Party, PRO Romania and Social Liberal Humanist Party campaigned under the electoral coalition "Alliance for Prahova".

== County Council ==
President of the County Council
Party	Candidate	Votes	Votes %
PNL USR-PLUS Alliance	Iulian Dumitrescu	137,286	46.88
Alliance for Prahova	Bogdan-Andrei Toader	103,996	35.51
People's Movement Party	Nicoleta-Cătălina	22,739	7.76
Ecologist Party of Romania	Dan-Aurel Ioniță	15,791	5.39
Alliance of Liberals and Democrats	Narcis-Cătălin Beciu	13,063	4.46
Total		292,875	100

Party composition of the County Council
Party	Votes	Votes %	Seats	Change
PNL USR-PLUS Alliance	131,179	45.82	17	▲2
Alliance for Prahova	90,442	31.59	11	▼5
People's Movement Party	26,891	9.39	3	▲1
Alliance of Liberals and Democrats	20,299	7.09	3	▼1
Prahova in Action Party	17,464	6.10	2	▲2
Total	286,275	100	36	N/A

== Local councils ==
Party composition of the local councils
Party	Votes	Votes %	Seats
National Liberal Party	115,644	38.66	605
Social Democratic Party	51,745	17.30	375
People's Movement Party	16,497	5.51	59
PRO Romania	9,977	3.34	53
USR-PLUS Alliance	15,769	5.27	28
Prahova in Action Party	10,298	3.44	27
Alliance of Liberals and Democrats	10,271	3.43	26
Social Liberal Humanist Party	4,267	1.43	22
Save Romania Union	4,294	1.44	14
PNL USR-PLUS Alliance	5,590	1.87	14
Ecologist Party of Romania	4,304	1.44	13
Green Party	2,980	1.00	12
Alliance for Băicoi	4,677	1.56	12
Alliance for Prahova	13,932	4.66	9
Independent	5,103	1.71	4
Others	24,805	8.29	123
Total	299,153	100	1396

== Mayors ==
Prahova County mayoral elections by party
Party	Votes	Votes %	Mayors
National Liberal Party	131,146	43.07	57
Social Democratic Party	53,039	17.42	30
Save Romania Union	5,132	1.69	2
PRO Romania	8,717	2.86	1
Independent	9,677	3.18	3
Others	96,796	31.79	11
Total	304,507	100	104
