= 2020 Dolj County local elections =

2020 elections held in Dolj County

- 27 September 2020
- Turnout: 48.43%

	First party	Second party
Party	PSD+ALDE Alliance	PNL
Seats before	25	12
Seats won	16	13
Seat change	▼9	▲1
Popular vote	103,318	82,748
Percentage	39.66%	31.76%
	Third party	Fourth party
Party	PRO Romania	PMP
Seats before	-	0
Seats won	3	2
Seat change	New	▲2
Popular vote	18,007	14,793
Percentage	6.91%	5.68%
President before election
Ion Prioteasa
PSD
Elected President
Dorin-Cosmin Vasile
PSD

The 2020 Dolj County local elections were held on 27 September. A total of 8,530 candidates ran for various local positions, including local councilors, mayors, county councilors and the President of the County Council.

== County Council ==
President of the County Council
Party	Candidate	Votes	Votes %
Social Democratic Party	Dorin-Cosmin Vasile	111,317	42.19
National Liberal Party	Alexandru Gîdăr	85,990	32.59
USR-PLUS Alliance	Silviu Bratu	18,721	7.09
PRO Romania	Florinel Stancu	14,329	5.43
People's Movement Party	Mihail-Cristian Negulescu	12,561	4.76
Ecologist Party of Romania	Nelu Dișteanu	10,631	4.03
Social Liberal Humanist Party	Cristian-Gabriel Ciulu	3,491	1.32
Green Party	Sergiu-Liviu Prăpucean	2,134	0.81
Alliance for the Union of Romanians	Ştefan-Mircea Măgălie	1,866	0.71
Others		2,834	1.08
Total		263,874	100

Composition of the County Council
Party	Votes	Votes %	Seats	Change
PSD+ALDE Alliance	103,318	39.66	16	▼9
National Liberal Party	82,748	31.76	13	▲1
PRO Romania	18,007	6.91	3	New
People's Movement Party	14,793	5.68	2	▲2
Ecologist Party of Romania	14,198	5.45	2	▲2
Others	27,443	10.54	0	Steady
Total	260,507	100	36	N/A

== Local councils ==
Composition of the local councils
Party	Votes	Votes %	Seats
Social Democratic Party	98,049	36.15	560
National Liberal Party	26,601	9.81	189
Others	146,588	54.04	0
Total	271,238	100	749

== Mayors ==
Mayoral elections by party
Party	Mayors
Social Democratic Party	78
National Liberal Party	30
People's Movement Party	2
Christian Democratic National Peasants' Party	1
Total	111
