= 2020 Timiș County local elections =

2020 elections held in Timiș County

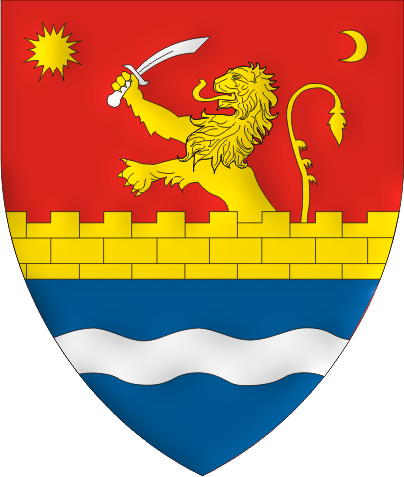
- 27 September 2020
- Turnout: 43.20%

	First party	Second party
Party	PNL	USR PLUS
Seats before	14	-
Seats won	16	10
Seat change	▲2	New
Popular vote	90,916	55,155
Percentage	35.50%	21.54%
	Third party	Fourth party
Party	PSD-PPUSL	PRO Romania
Seats before	16	-
Seats won	7	3
Seat change	▼9	New
Popular vote	38,458	18,545
Percentage	15.02%	7.24%
President before election
Călin-Ionel Dobra
PSD
Elected President
Alin-Adrian Nica
PNL

The 2020 Timiș County local elections were held on 27 September. A total of 9,010 candidates ran for various local positions, such as local councilors, mayors, county councilors and the President of the County Council.

The elections resulted in the Social Democratic Party losing control of the county council in favor of the National Liberal Party. Considerable gains were also achieved by USR-PLUS Alliance.

== County Council results ==
President of the County Council
Party	Candidate	Votes	Votes %
National Liberal Party	Alin-Adrian Nica	104,508	40.25
USR-PLUS Alliance	Cristian-Alin Moș	51,749	19.93
PSD-PPSUL Alliance	Călin-Ionel Dobra	48,584	18.71
PRO Romania	Radu-Adrian Pau	11,771	4.53
Alliance of Liberals and Democrats	Titu Bojin	9,447	3.64
People's Movement Party	Cornel-Mircea Sămărtinean	8,803	3.39
Democratic Alliance of Hungarians in Romania	Zoltan-Gheorghe Marossy	6,744	2.60
Green Party	Ioan Romoșan	4,511	1.74
Independent	Tiberiu Brâncovan	9,183	3.54
Others		4,360	1.68
Total		259,660	100

Party composition of the County Council
Party	Votes	Votes %	Seats	Change
National Liberal Party	90,916	35.50	16	▲2
USR-PLUS Alliance	55,155	21.54	10	New
PSD-PPSUL Alliance	38,458	15.02	7	▼9
PRO Romania	18,545	7.24	3	New
Others	53.043	20.71	0	▼7
Total	256,117	100	36	N/A

== Local councils results ==
Party composition of the local councils
Party	Votes	Votes %	Seats
National Liberal Party	89,816	34.10	492
Social Democratic Party	39,918	15.15	359
USR-PLUS Alliance	57,928	21.99	125
PRO Romania	16,169	6.14	73
People's Movement Party	10,500	3.98	53
Democratic Alliance of Hungarians in Romania	7,523	2.85	26
Alliance of Liberals and Democrats	5,323	2.02	13
Green Party	4,852	1.84	11
Social Liberal Humanist Party	2,338	0.88	11
Ecologist Party of Romania	2,040	0.77	9
Independent	4,633	1.75	4
Others	22,274	8.53	67
Total	263,314	100	1,243

== Mayoral results ==
Timiș County mayoral elections by party
Party	Votes	Votes %	Mayors
National Liberal Party	96,928	36.51	47
Social Democratic Party	46,504	17.52	37
People's Movement Party	9,088	3.42	4
USR-PLUS Alliance	68,819	25.92	4
PRO Romania	13,343	5.03	2
Others	30,813	11.61	4
Total	265,495	100	98
