= 2020 Constanța County local elections =

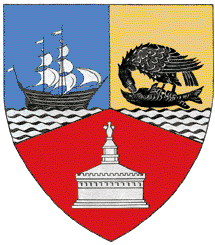
- 27 September 2020
- Turnout: 46.28%

	First party	Second party
Party	PNL	PSD-ALDE-PNȚCD-ADER
Seats before	15	19
Seats won	15	10
Seat change	Steady	▼9
Popular vote	97,343	62,007
Percentage	36.12%	23.01%
	Third party	Fourth party
Party	USR PLUS	PMP
Seats before	-	3
Seats won	5	3
Seat change	New	Steady
Popular vote	34,896	21,727
Percentage	12.95%	8.06%
President before election
Marius-Horia Țuțuianu
PSD
Elected President
Mihai Lupu
PNL

The 2020 Constanța County local elections were held on 27 September. A total of 5,808 candidates participated in the elections for a range of local positions, including local councilors, mayors, county councilors and the President of the County Council.

== County Council ==
President of the County Council
Party	Candidate	Votes	Votes %
National Liberal Party	Mihai Lupu	101,893	37.42
PSD-ALDE-PNȚCD-ADER	Feelix Stroe	68,803	25.27
USR-PLUS Alliance	Eugen-Remus Negoi	36,816	13.52
People's Movement Party	Florentina-Ioana Reșit	19,703	7.24
PRO Romania	Răzvan Filipescu	14,716	5.40
Ecologist Party of Romania	Daniel-Constantin Moraru	11,841	4.35
Independent	Gheorghe Muhscină	7,070	2.60
Others		11,475	4.21
Total		272,317	100

Party composition of the County Council
Party	Votes	Votes %	Seats	Change
National Liberal Party	97,343	36.12	15	Steady
PSD-ALDE-PNȚCD-ADER	62,007	23.01	10	▼9
USR-PLUS Alliance	34,896	12.95	5	New
People's Movement Party	21,727	8.06	3	Steady
PRO Romania	17,161	6.37	3	New
Others	28,516	10.58	0	Steady
Total	269,503	100	36	N/A

== Local councils ==
Party composition of the local councils
Party	Votes	Votes %	Seats
National Liberal Party	98,148	35.57	386
Social Democratic Party	66,190	23.99	343
People's Movement Party	19,707	7.14	66
PRO Romania	13,478	4.88	46
USR-PLUS Alliance	33,505	12.14	36
Ecologist Party of Romania	8,789	3.19	15
PSD-PNȚCD	3,790	1.37	11
Alliance of Liberals and Democrats	4,868	1.76	10
Independent	7,840	2.84	2
Others	19,610	7.11	23
Total	275,925	100	938

== Mayors ==
Constanța County mayoral elections by party
Party	Votes	Votes %	Mayors
Social Democratic Party	71,840	25.78	33
National Liberal Party	104,120	37.37	31
People's Movement Party	16,553	5.94	3
PSD-PNȚCD	3,860	1.39	1
Independent	16,152	5.80	1
Others	66,125	23.73	1
Total	278,650	100	70
