= 2020 Alba County local elections =

- 27 September 2020
- Turnout: 48.46%

	First party	Second party
Party	PNL	PSD
Seats before	19	9
Seats won	19	6
Seat change	Steady	▼3
Popular vote	75,065	24,424
Percentage	51.04%	16.61%
	Third party	Fourth party
Party	USR PLUS	PMP
Seats before	-	2
Seats won	4	3
Seat change	New	▲1
Popular vote	13,949	9,672
Percentage	9.48%	6.58%
President before election
Paul Voicu
PNL
Elected President
Ion Dumitrel
PNL

In Alba County, the 2020 local elections were held on 27 September. A total of 6,269 candidates ran for the offices of mayors, local councilors and county councilors.

== County Council elections ==
Council President
Party	Candidate	Votes	Votes %
National Liberal Party	Ion Dumitrel	83,087	55.74
Social Democratic Party	Ioan Dirzu	27,964	18.76
USR-PLUS Alliance	Mihail David	13,643	9.15
People's Movement Party	Clement Negrut	7,233	4.85
Alliance of Liberals and Democrats	Ioan Lazar	6,089	4.08
Alliance for the Union of Romanians	Vasile Bucur	5,316	3.57
PRO Romania	Horatiu Florea	4,558	3.06
Social Liberal Humanist Party	Constantin Talpas	1,175	0.79
Total		149,065	100

County Councilors
Party	Votes	Votes %	Seats	Change
National Liberal Party	75,065	51.04	19	Steady
Social Democratic Party	24,424	16.61	6	▼3
USR-PLUS Alliance	13,949	9.48	4	New
People's Movement Party	9,672	6.58	3	▲1
Others	23,969	16.30	0	▼3
Total	147,079	100	30	N/A

== Local councils elections ==
Local Councilors
Party	Votes	Votes %	Seats
National Liberal Party	68,832	45.86	467
Social Democratic Party	28,827	19.21	207
People's Movement Party	7,616	5.07	54
USR-PLUS Alliance	15,321	10.21	46
Alliance of Liberals and Democrats	6,227	4.15	37
Democratic Alliance of Hungarians in Romania	4,334	2.89	33
PRO Romania	5,960	3.97	32
Alliance for the Union of Romanians	4,017	2.68	18
Independent	3,724	2.48	7
Others	5,242	3.49	15
Total	150,100	100	916

== Mayoral elections ==
Mayors
Party	Votes	Votes %	Mayors
National Liberal Party	78,025	51.42	60
Social Democratic Party	28,747	18.94	8
Independent	3,670	2.42	3
Democratic Alliance of Hungarians in Romania	1,555	1.02	2
USR-PLUS Alliance	17,232	11.36	2
Alliance for the Union of Romanians	3,305	2.18	1
People's Movement Party	6,545	4.31	1
Alliance of Liberals and Democrats	5,387	3.55	1
Others	7,279	4.80	0
Total	151,745	100	78
