= Daniel Constantin (politician) =

Romanian politician (born 1978)

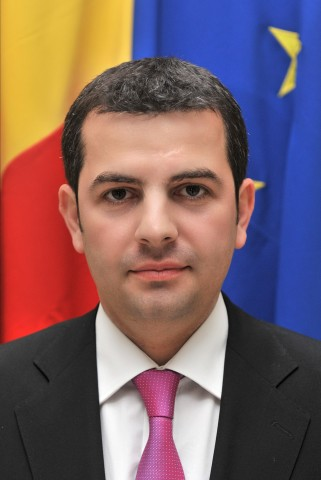
- Constantin in 2012

Deputy Prime Minister of Romania
- In office 4 January 2017 – 3 April 2017
- Prime Minister: Sorin Grindeanu
- In office 5 March 2014 – 13 December 2014
- Prime Minister: Victor Ponta

President of the Conservative Party
- In office February 2010 – 19 June 2015
- Preceded by: Dan Voiculescu
- Succeeded by: Himself & Călin Popescu-Tăriceanu (party merged with the Liberal Reformist Party into the Alliance of Liberals and Democrats)

Co-Founding Leader of the Alliance of Liberals and Democrats
- In office 19 June 2015 – April 2017 Serving with Călin Popescu-Tăriceanu
- Preceded by: Himself (as president of the Conservative Party); Călin Popescu-Tăriceanu (as president of the Liberal Reformist Party)
- Succeeded by: Călin Popescu-Tăriceanu

Minister of Agriculture and Rural Development
- In office 7 May 2012 – 17 November 2015
- Prime Minister: Victor Ponta
- Preceded by: Stelian Fuia
- Succeeded by: Achim Irimescu

Minister of Environment and Climate Change
- In office 4 January 2017 – 3 April 2017
- Prime Minister: Sorin Grindeanu
- Preceded by: Cristiana Pașca-Palmer
- Succeeded by: Gratiela-Leocadia Gavrilescu

Member of the Chamber of Deputies
- Incumbent
- Assumed office 19 December 2012

Personal details
- Born: 26 June 1978 (age 48) Pitești, Argeș County, Romania
- Party: National Liberal Party (2020–present)
- Other political affiliations: Conservative Party (before 2015); Alliance of Liberals and Democrats (2015–2017); PRO Romania Party (2017–2020)
- Education: University of Agronomic Sciences and Veterinary Medicine

Daniel Constantin (Romanian pronunciation: [daniˈel konstanˈtin]; born June 26, 1978) is a Romanian politician who is currently a member of the National Liberal Party (PNL).

He has been a Member of Parliament since 2012, co-chairman of ALDE from 2015 to 2017, and Deputy Prime Minister and Minister of Environment from January to April, 2017.

== Education ==
Daniel Constantin graduated from the Faculty of Animal Husbandry (in 2002) and made his Master at the Faculty of Management, Quality Management and Innovation (in 2004) at the University of Agronomic Sciences and Veterinary Medicine of Bucharest.

== Professional career ==
Among the professional activities are to be mentioned:

- Between April 2009 and October 2009 he held the position of Director General of the Payments and Intervention Agency for Agriculture;
- Between 2007 and 2009 he was an independent evaluator of the World Bank in the MAKIS project;
- Between 2003 and 2006 he held the position of Coordinator of the Body of European Integration Advisers within the Ministry of Agriculture, Forests and Rural Development;

Between 1999 and 2003 he held several positions representing the Students of the University of Agronomic Sciences and Veterinary Medicine Bucharest, among which are:

- Between 2000 and 2002 he was the president of the League of Students from the University of Agronomic Sciences and Veterinary Medicine Bucharest;
- Between 2001 and 2002 he was a member of the National Council of Students under the Ministry of Education and Research.

== Political career ==
=== President of the PC ===
In 2006, Daniel Constantin joined the Conservative Party (PC), where he coordinated the work of the European Funds Department. In 2010, following an extraordinary congress of the party, he was elected president of the PC, with the support of the party's founder, Dan Voiculescu. At the age of 32, Daniel Constantin became the youngest party president in Romania. He stayed in that office until the dissolution of PC in 2015.

=== Minister of Agriculture ===
In 2012, Daniel Constantin was appointed the Minister of Agriculture in the Victor Ponta cabinet. The agriculture portfolio and the appointment of Constantin to this post were announced by the Prime Minister Ponta before the presentation of the composition of the government, which showed that his position was established before the negotiations of the other portfolios.

Daniel Constantin has a personal debt of almost 300,000 euros to Dan Voiculescu. The Ministry of Agriculture, under the leadership of Daniel Constantin, is in dispute with the Grivco group, controlled by Voiculescu, accusing him of a damage of 60 million euros, following the fraudulent privatization of the Food Research Institute (ICA). Voiculescu was sued in December 2008, in the case regarding the privatization of ICA, a state-owned company acquired by Voiculescu from the state after it was undervalued by over 60 million euros. Thus, Constantine is suspected of having been appointed minister only to remove them. Subsequently, by virtue of this debt, the National Agency for Fiscal Administration won in 2018 a lawsuit against Daniel Constantin in which the state must recover part of the damage from the ICA file from the payment of that debt.

On 9 December 2012, he won the became MP from Argeș County.

=== ALDE co-chairman ===
Through the merger of the Conservative Party and the Liberal Reformist Party (PLR), the Alliance of Liberals and Democrats (ALDE) party was founded on 19 June 2015, with Daniel Constantin as its founding member. Together with former PLR president Călin Popescu-Tăriceanu he co-chaired the party, that joined a coalition with the Social Democratic Party (PSD) under Liviu Dragnea after the 2016 parliamentary election. In the cabinet of Sorin Grindeanu, Constantin served as deputy prime minister and minister of environment and climate change from January to April 2017.

=== PRO Romania and PNL ===
In May 2017, Daniel Constantin and former education minister Sorin Cîmpeanu left ALDE after a conflict with co-chair Popescu-Tăriceanu. Together with former Prime Ministers Victor Ponta who had been expelled from PSD, they founded the social-liberal Pro Romania Party (PRO). The new party was led by Daniel Constantin as interim chairman, until Ponta took that position at the first party congress in October 2018. In November 2019, Constantin and six other PRO deputies voted, against Ponta's order, for the new government of Ludovic Orban of the National Liberal Party (PNL). In early 2020, Constantin alongside Cîmpeanu and three other former PRO lawmakers joined the PNL.
