= Partidul Liberal Reformator =

Partidul Liberal Reformator may refer to:

- Liberal Reformist Party (Moldova)
- Liberal Reformist Party (Romania)
