= 2020 Romanian parliamentary election =

- 6 December 2020

All 136 seats in the Senate All 330 seats in the Chamber of Deputies 69 S and 166 D seats needed for a majority
- Registered: 18,964,642
- Turnout: 31.95% (▼6.49 pp)
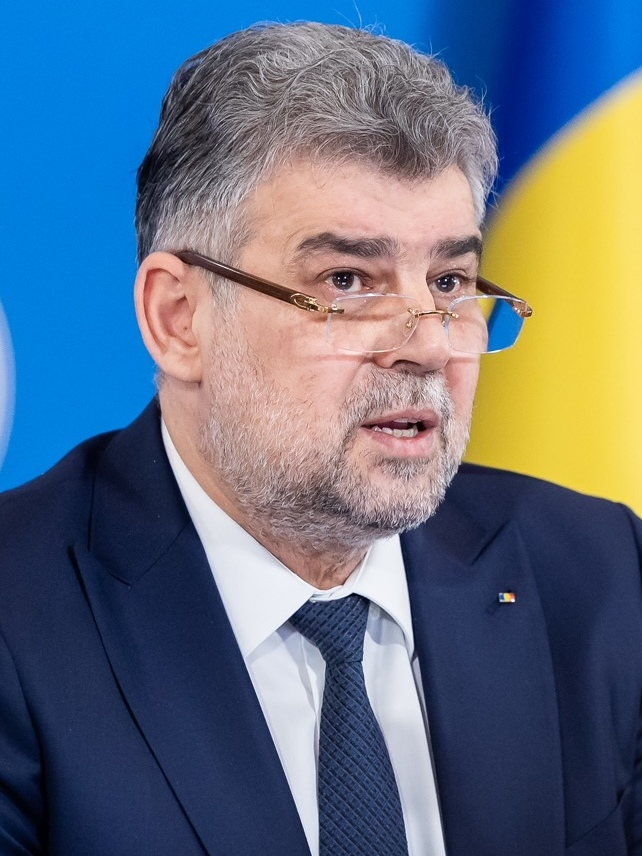

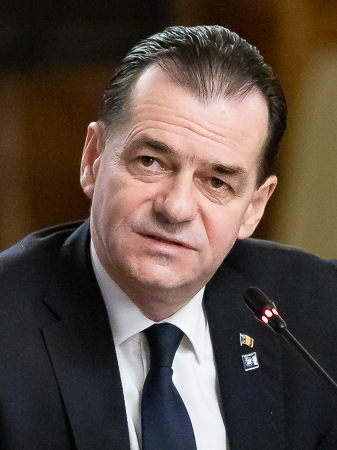

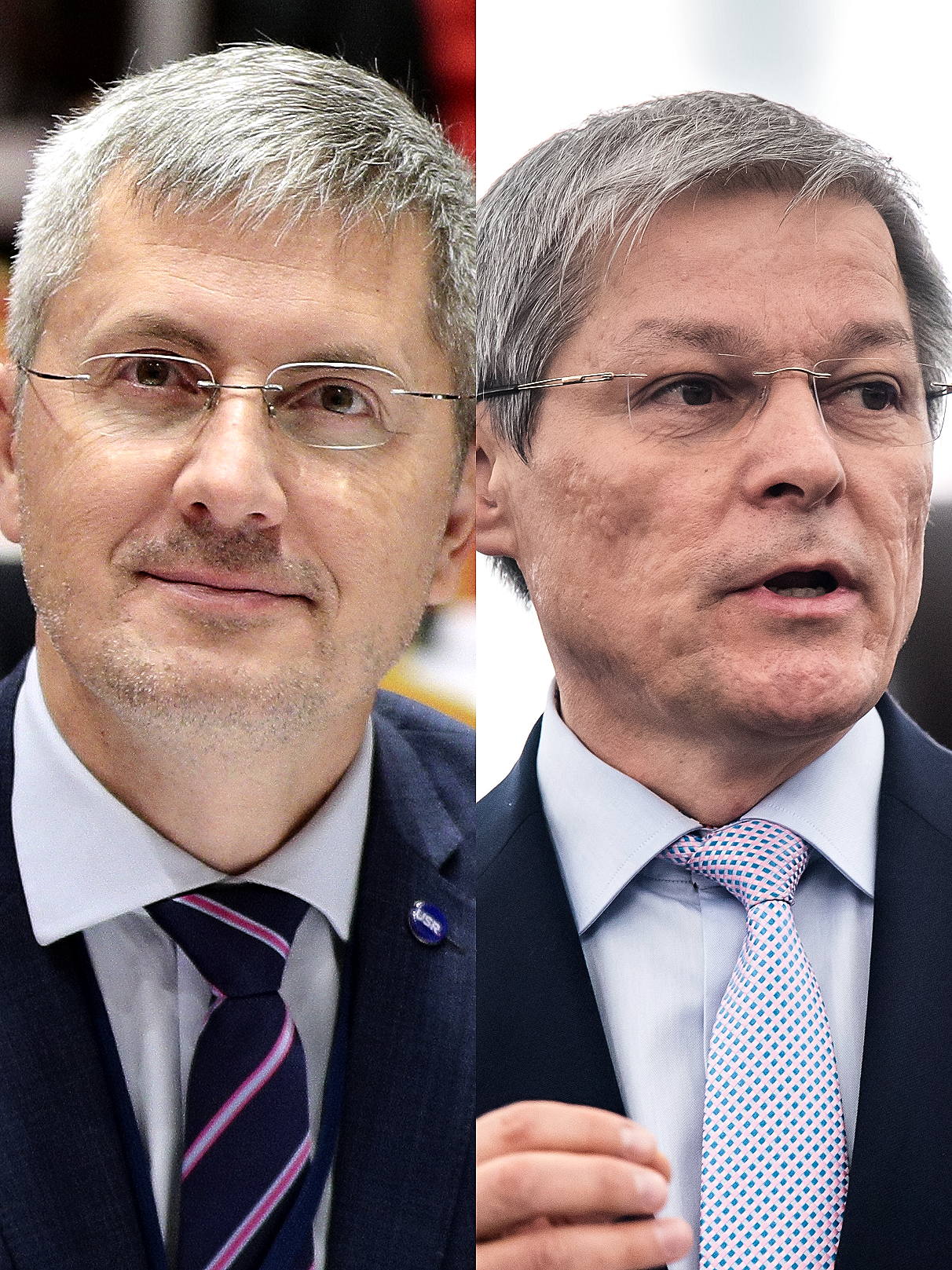

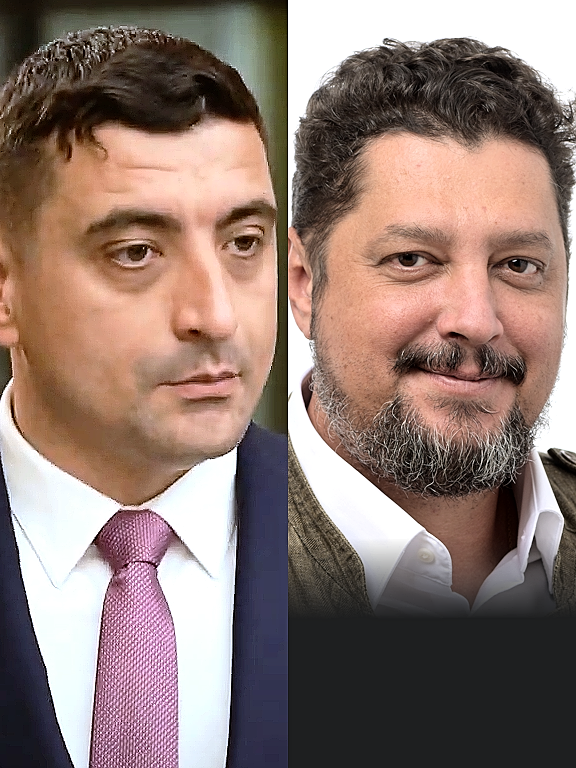

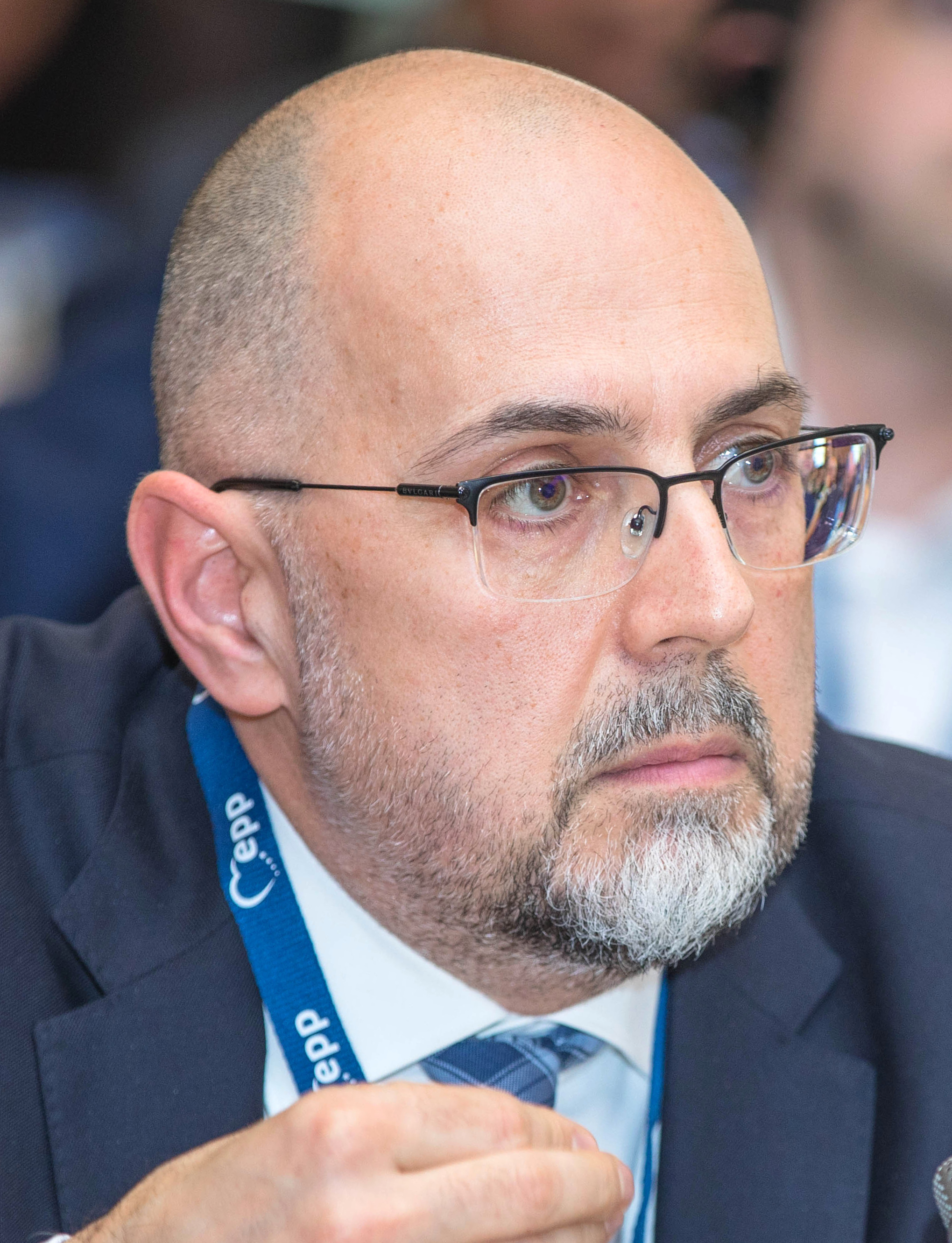

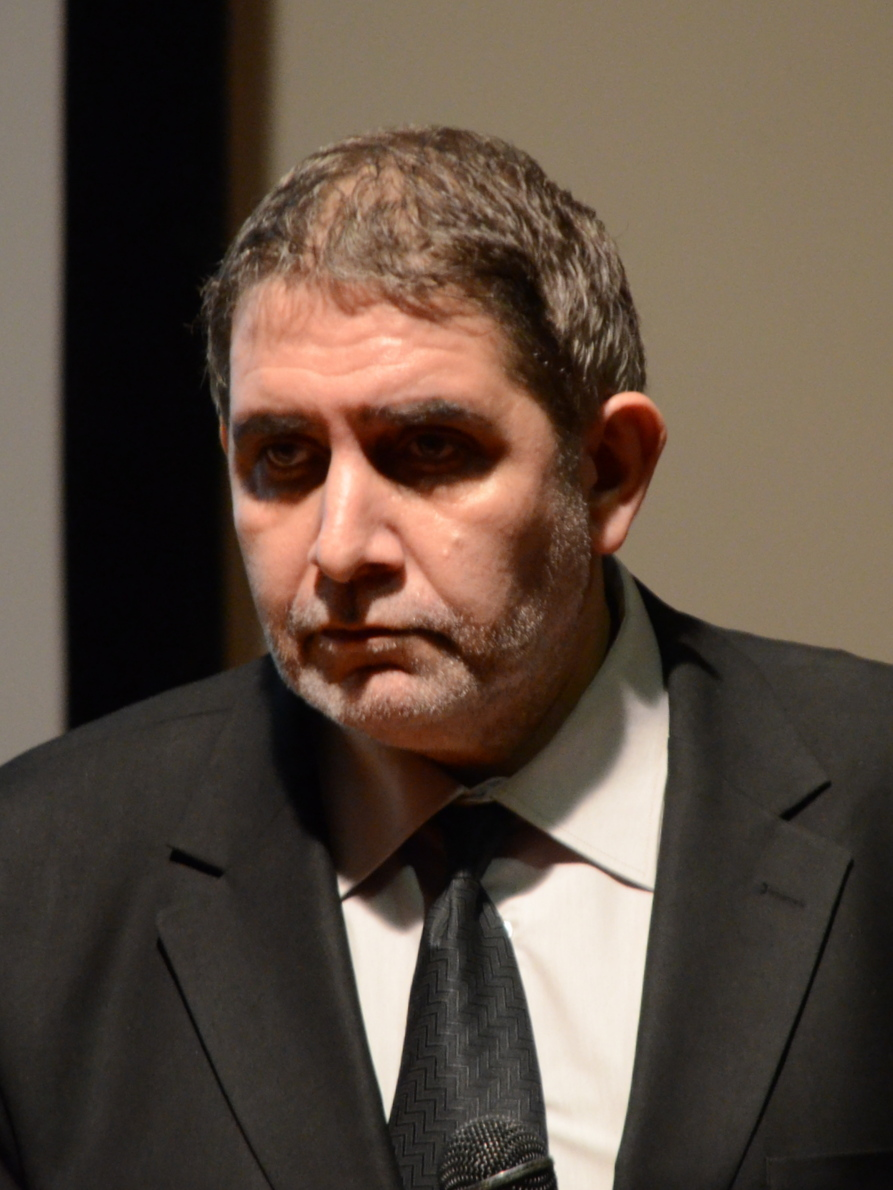
| | First party | Second party | Third party |
|---|---|---|---|
| Leader | Marcel Ciolacu | Ludovic Orban | Dan Barna; Dacian Cioloș |
| Party | PSD | PNL | USR PLUS |
| Leader's seat | D - Buzău | D - Bucharest | D - Sibiu; MEP |
| Last election | 67 S / 154 D | 30 S / 69 D | 13 S / 30 D |
| Seats after | 47 S / 110 D | 41 S / 93 D | 25 S / 55 D |
| Seat change | ▼20 S / ▼44 D | ▲11 S / ▲24 D | ▲12 S / ▲25 D |
| Popular vote | 1,705,777 | 1,486,401 | 906,962 |
| Percentage | 28.90% | 25.19% | 15.37% |
| | Fourth party | Fifth party | Sixth party |
| Leader | George Simion; Claudiu Târziu | Hunor Kelemen | Varujan Pambuccian (Note: Pambuccian, a member of the Union of Armenians of Romania, has been the parliamentary leader of the national minorities' group since 1996.) |
| Party | AUR | UDMR | Minority parties |
| Leader's seat | D - Bucharest; S - Bucharest | D - Harghita | D - Nationwide (Note: National minorities have nationwide mandates and do not represent a specific county.) |
| Last election | - | 9 S / 21 D | 0 S / 17 D |
| Seats after | 14 S / 33 D | 9 S / 21 D | 0 S / 18 D |
| Seat change | New | 0 S / 0 D | 0 S / ▲1 D |
| Popular vote | 535,828 | 339,030 | 98,681 |
| Percentage | 9.08% | 5.74% | 1.67% |
Prime Minister before election
Ludovic Orban
PNL
Prime Minister after election
Florin Cîțu
PNL

Parliamentary elections were held in Romania on 6 December 2020 to elect the 136 members of the Senate and the 330 constituent members of the Chamber of Deputies.

While the Social Democratic Party (PSD) remained the largest political party in the Parliament, its popular vote share dropped considerably, by a third. The elections resulted in a centre-right coalition government formed by the National Liberal Party (PNL), USR PLUS, and the Democratic Union of Hungarians in Romania (UDMR/RMDSZ) (i.e. the former Cîțu Cabinet) with former Minister of Public Finance and former PNL president Florin Cîțu as Prime Minister.

The final voter turnout was approximately 32%, the lowest since the end of the communist era in Romania, partially due to the COVID-19 pandemic in the country.

== Electoral system ==
The 330 members of the Chamber of Deputies are elected by several methods: 308 are elected from 42 multi-member constituencies based on counties and Bucharest, using proportional representation, four are elected using proportional representation from a constituency representing Romanians living abroad. Parties must pass a threshold of 5% of the national vote or at least 20% of the vote in four constituencies. Further seats (currently 18) can be added for ethnic minority groups that compete in the elections and pass a special (lower) threshold (calculated as 10% of the votes needed to obtain one of the regular 312 seats).

The 136 members of the Senate are also elected using party-list proportional representation, but from 43 constituencies based on the 41 counties (a total of 121 seats), Bucharest (13 seats), and one for Romanians living overseas (two seats).

Following the elections, seats are allocated to the candidates of successful parties and lists in several stages, starting with constituencies, where seats are distributed according to the Hare quota of the constituency. Unused votes are then transferred and congregated at the national level, where remaining seats are distributed using the D'Hondt method, to ensure overall proportionality between a party's national vote share and its share of parliamentary seats. These remaining seats are then allocated to party candidates within the constituencies, based on the party results in each constituencies.

== Government ==
The previous election saw the Social Democratic Party (PSD) led by Liviu Dragnea emerge as the largest political party in the parliament, although they fell short of an absolute majority. Nevertheless, the PSD eventually established a coalition agreement with the Alliance of Liberals and Democrats (ALDE), forming the Grindeanu Cabinet in January 2017. However, the new government did not last long and was replaced by the Tudose Cabinet in June 2017, which was also short-lived. Ultimately, the Dăncilă Cabinet took office in January 2018. It was dismissed by a motion of no confidence in October 2019, and replaced by a National Liberal Party (PNL) minority government under Ludovic Orban in November 2019. The Orban cabinet was dismissed by a motion of no confidence on the 5 February 2020, but took office again on 14 March 2020.

== Period before the political campaign ==
The government decided parliamentary elections would be held on 6 December 2020. On 30 September 2020, the president of the Alliance of Liberals and Democrats (ALDE), Călin Popescu-Tăriceanu, proposed on Facebook that the elections be postponed to March 2021. On 2 October 2020, former Save Romania Union (USR) deputy Adrian Dohotaru submitted a bill to the Senate, proposing the parliamentary elections be held on 14 March 2021, which received support from the Social Democratic Party (PSD). On 7 October 2020, the first vice-president of the PSD, Sorin Grindeanu, claimed that the government's plan would lead to a surge in COVID-19 cases. On 8 October, Călin Popescu-Tăriceanu and Victor Ponta announced in a press conference that their parties will run in the elections on a shared list under a single name: Social-Liberal PRO Romania (Romanian: PRO România Social-Liberal).

PSD president Marcel Ciolacu announced on 15 October that the World Health Organization's representative in Romania, Alexandru Rafila, was one of the party's candidates for the parliamentary elections. He will be top of the list of deputies for the Bucharest circumscription, while Gabriela Firea will lead the list of senators.

== Political parties ==
The following table presents the composition of the Parliament of Romania during the 2016–2020 parliamentary term.

| Party | Abbr. | Founded | Leader | Ideology | 2016 result | | Seats at dissolution | Government support | | Ref |
| Party | Abbr. | Founded | Leader | Ideology | Votes (%) | Seats | Seats at dissolution | Grindeanu (2017) Tudose (2017–18) Dăncilă (2018–19) | Orban I (2019–20) Orban II (2020) | Ref |
|---|---|---|---|---|---|---|---|---|---|---|
| Social Democratic Party (Romanian: Partidul Social Democrat) | PSD | 2001 | Marcel Ciolacu | Social democracy Social conservatism Left-wing nationalism Soft Euroscepticism | 45.48% D 45.68% S | 154 / 329; 67 / 136 | 123 / 329; 68 / 136 | Coalition government | Opposition | |
| National Liberal Party (Romanian: Partidul Național Liberal) | PNL | 1990 (1875) | Ludovic Orban | Conservative liberalism Liberal conservatism Pro-Europeanism | 20.04% D 20.42% S | 69 / 329; 30 / 136 | 82 / 329; 31 / 136 | Opposition | Minority government | |
| Save Romania Union (Romanian: Uniunea Salvați România) | USR | 2015 | Dan Barna | Anti-corruption; Liberalism; Economic liberalism | 8.87% D 8.92% S | 30 / 329; 13 / 136 | 25 / 329; 13 / 136 | Opposition | Supporting government | |
| Democratic Alliance of Hungarians in Romania (Hungarian: Romániai Magyar Demokrata Szövetség; Romanian: Uniunea Democrată Maghiară din România) | UDMR; RMDSZ | 1989 | Hunor Kelemen | Hungarian minority interests Liberal conservatism Christian democracy | 6.19% D 6.24% S | 21 / 329; 9 / 136 | 20 / 329; 9 / 136 | Supporting PSD–ALDE government (until August 2019) | Opposition (since February 2020) | |
| People's Movement Party (Romanian: Partidul Mișcarea Populară) | PMP | 2014 | Eugen Tomac | Liberal conservatism Christian democracy Economic liberalism | 5.35% D 5.65% S | 18 / 329; 8 / 136 | 16 / 329; 6 / 136 | Opposition | Supporting government | |
| PRO Romania Social-Liberal (Romanian: PRO România Social-Liberal) | PRO | 2018 | Victor Ponta | Social liberalism Pro-Europeanism | Did not exist | | 21 / 329; 3 / 136 | Opposition (formed February 2018) | Opposition | |
| Alliance of Liberals and Democrats (Romanian: Alianța Liberalilor și Democraților) | ALDE | 2015 | Călin Popescu-Tăriceanu | Liberalism; Conservative liberalism Soft Euroscepticism | 5.62% D 6.01% S | 20 / 329; 9 / 136 | Subsequently merged with PRO Romania in 2020 | Government minority partner until August 2019 | —N/a | |
| Humanist Power Party (Romanian: Partidul Puterii Umaniste) | PPU-SL | 2015 | Daniel Ionașcu | Humanism; Social liberalism | 0.04% D 0.04% S | 0 / 329; 0 / 136 | 7 / 329; 0 / 136 | —N/a | Opposition | |
| Ethnic minority parties | | – | – | – | 1.34% D 0.01% S | 17 / 329; 0 / 136 | 17 / 329; 0 / 136 | Neutral (Mostly supporting government) | | |
| Non-inscrits | | – | – | – | – | | 12 / 329; 0 / 136 | —N/a | Neutral | |

== Opinion polls ==
=== Party vote ===
Color key:

Exit polls

| Date | Poll source | Sample size | PSD | PNL | USR | PLUS | UDMR | PRO | ALDE | PMP | AUR | Others | Lead |
| 6 December 2020 | 2020 parliamentary elections | | 28.9 110 | 25.2 93 | 15.4 55 | | 5.7 21 | 4.1 0 | | 4.8 0 | 9.1 33 | 6.8 18 (Note: MPs from the Romanian ethnic minority parties.) | 3.7 |
|---|---|---|---|---|---|---|---|---|---|---|---|---|---|
| 6 December 2020 (Note: Poll measuring Chamber of Deputies results) | CURS-Avangarde | – | 30.5 | 29.0 | 15.9 | | 5.7 | 5.0 | | 5.0 | 5.2 | 3.7 | 1.5 |
| 6 December 2020 | Sociopol | – | 28.0 | 28.0 | 16.3 | | 6.2 | 5.7 | | 4.3 | 5.8 | 5.7 | Tie |
| 6 December 2020 (Note: Poll measuring Senate results) | CURS-Avangarde | – | 30.6 | 29.1 | 16.4 | | 5.7 | 5.0 | | 5.0 | 5.3 | 2.9 | 1.5 |
| 6 December 2020 | Sociopol | – | 28.3 | 28.3 | 16.8 | | 6.4 | 6.3 | | 4.6 | 5.9 | 3.4 | Tie |
| 6 December 2020 | INSOMAR IC | – | 28.2 | 32.8 | 15.6 | | 5.8 | 4.5 | | 6.0 | 3.0 | 4.1 | 4.6 |
| 6 Dec 2020 | PNL | —N/a | 27.0 | 30.0 | 23.0 | | 5.5 | 4.2 | | 3.0 | 6.5 | – | 3.0 |
| 3 Dec 2020 | Politico | —N/a | 28 | 31 | 16 | | 4 | 7 | | 3 | – | – | 3 |
| 2–3 Dec 2020 | IRES | 1,067 | 35 | 32 | 16 | | 3 | 7 | | 3 | 3 | 1 | 3 |
| 1 Dec 2020 | PMP | —N/a | 31 | 28 | 21 | | 6 | 5 | | 6 | 2 | 1 | 3 |
| 30 Nov 2020 | PRO | —N/a | 22.0 | 31.0 | 17.0 | | 5.0 | 7.8 | | 3.0 | – | 14.2 | 9.0 |
| 28–29 Nov 2020 | Sociopol | 1,033 | 28 | 29 | 13 | | 6 | 6 | | 3 | 7 | 8 | 1 |
| 22–28 Nov 2020 | IRSOP | 1,004 | 30 | 33 | 17 | | 5 | 7 | | 3 | – | 5 | 3 |
| 6–27 Nov 2020 | IMAS | 1,010 | 23.6 | 28.5 | 18.0 | | 4.7 | 9.5 | 3.3 | 4.6 | – | 7.8 | 4.9 |
| 20–25 Nov 2020 | Verifield | 1,100 | 22.0 | 31.3 | 17.0 | | 5.4 | 9.3 | | 4.8 | – | 10.2 | 9.3 |
| 1–10 Nov 2020 | CURS | 1,067 | 29 | 32 | 16 | | 5 | 6 | | 7 | – | – | 3 |
| 9 Nov 2020 | PNL | —N/a | 27.0 | 32.0 | 21.0 | | 6.0 | 5.0 | | 6.0 | – | 3.0 | 5.0 |
| 25–30 Oct 2020 | BCS | 1,482 | 28.6 | 32.2 | 17.6 | | 4.8 | 5.2 | | 7.4 | – | 4.2 | 3.6 |
| 7–28 Oct 2020 | IMAS | 1,010 | 21.7 | 32.6 | 20.4 | | 5.1 | 8.9 | 2.5 | 4.8 | – | 4.3 | 10.9 |
| 9–17 Oct 2020 | USR–PLUS | —N/a | 23 | 30 | 23 | | 5 | 8 | | 5 | – | 6 | 7 |
| 8–11 Oct 2020 | CURS | 800 | 31 | 32 | 12 | | 5 | 6 | 3 | 6 | – | 5 | 1 |
| 8 October 2020 | ALDE and PRO Romania merge into PRO Romania Social Liberal | | | | | | | | | | | | |
| 27 September 2020 | Local elections | | | | | | | | | | | | |
| 7–23 Sep 2020 | IMAS | 1,010 | 19.6 | 34.7 | 17 | | 5.3 | 9.5 | 3.0 | 4.5 | – | 6.4 | 15.1 |
| 6–26 Aug 2020 | IMAS | 1,010 | 20.8 | 33.6 | 18.3 | | 5.7 | 10.6 | 2.4 | 4.1 | – | 4.6 | 12.8 |
| 15 August 2020 | USR and PLUS merge | | | | | | | | | | | | |
| 29 Jul–5 Aug 2020 | CURS | 1,100 | 28 | 31 | 14 | | 4 | 7 | 5 | 5 | – | 6 | 3 |
| 10–29 Jul 2020 | IMAS | 1,010 | 23.4 | 33.4 | 17.2 | | 5.6 | 9.7 | 3.4 | 3.9 | – | 3.4 | 10 |
| 19–30 Jun 2020 | CURS | 1,100 | 28 | 32 | 16 | | 5 | 7 | 5 | 5 | – | 2 | 4 |
| 5–27 Jun 2020 | IMAS | 1,010 | 21.9 | 33.0 | 12.3 | 5.8 | 3.4 | 11.2 | 3.7 | 4.7 | – | 4.0 | 11.1 |
| 8–27 May 2020 | IMAS | 1,010 | 23.0 | 32.6 | 11.6 | 5.1 | 5.1 | 11.2 | 4.2 | 3.7 | – | 3.1 | 9.6 |
| 15–26 May 2020 | Avangarde | 1,000 | 29 | 35 | 13 | | 5 | 6 | 4 | 4 | – | 4 | 6 |
| 21 May 2020 | PSD | —N/a | 27 | 35 | 16 | 2 | 4 | 8 | 4 | 4 | – | – | 8 |
| 15–20 May 2020 | INSCOP | 1,132 | 25.8 | 38.5 | 10.2 | | 6.0 | 9.4 | 3.6 | 3.5 | – | 2.9 | 12.7 |
| 1–7 May 2020 | BCS | 1,545 | 22.5 | 33.0 | 22.0 | | 5.3 | 5.1 | 1.4 | 6.5 | – | 4.3 | 10.5 |
| 6–24 Apr 2020 | IMAS | 1,010 | 24.8 | 33.0 | 10.8 | 5.1 | 5.5 | 8.2 | 4.4 | 3.4 | – | 4.8 | 8.2 |
| 1–15 Apr 2020 | BCS | 1,008 | 22.9 | 31.3 | 19.9 | | 3.6 | 8.8 | 2.5 | 6.7 | – | 4.2 | 8.4 |
| 5–26 Mar 2020 | IMAS | —N/a | 23.9 | 36.7 | 12.5 | 6.5 | 4.5 | 5.8 | 3.5 | 3.5 | – | 3.0 | 12.8 |
| 11–28 Feb 2020 | IMAS | 1,010 | 25.8 | 40.7 | 10.0 | 3.5 | 4.4 | 4.6 | 4.3 | 3.6 | – | 3.1 | 14.9 |
| 13–31 Jan 2020 | IMAS | 1,007 | 20.6 | 47.4 | 12.4 | 3.4 | 4.7 | 3.8 | 3.2 | 1.8 | – | 2.7 | 26.8 |
| 20–30 Jan 2020 | CURS | 1,229 | 26 | 37 | 14 | | 5 | 6 | 4 | 4 | – | 1 | 11 |
| 13–18 Dec 2019 | Sociopol | 1,000 | 23 | 47 | 13 | | 4 | 5 | 2 | 3 | – | 3 | 24 |
| 4–18 Dec 2019 | IMAS | 1,011 | 18.5 | 45.0 | 11.5 | 3.5 | 5.0 | 6.4 | 3.5 | 3.0 | – | 4.6 | 26.5 |
| 12–17 Dec 2019 | CURS | 1,067 | 31 | 35 | 14 | | 4 | 6 | 4 | 5 | – | 1 | 4 |
| 11–27 Nov 2019 | IMAS | 1,011 | 21.3 | 39.0 | 12.6 | 5.6 | 4.2 | 6.4 | 3.3 | 2.9 | – | 4.7 | 17.7 |
| 24 November 2019 | Iohannis re-elected President of Romania with 66.09% of the vote | | | | | | | | | | | | |
| 25 Oct–3 Nov 2019 | USR | 1,225 | 24.0 | 38.2 | 20.0 | | 4.5 | 4.8 | – | 4.3 | – | 4.2 | 14.2 |
| 8–28 Oct 2019 | IMAS | 1,010 | 21.2 | 29.6 | 16.4 | 5.6 | 5.5 | 10.7 | 4.3 | 3.4 | – | 4.4 | 8.4 |
| 15–23 Oct 2019 | USR | —N/a | 24.9 | 36.8 | 19.9 | | 4.0 | 6.5 | – | 4.0 | – | 3.9 | 11.9 |
| 12–19 Oct 2019 | BCS | 1,117 | 23.8 | 36.3 | 16.8 | | 5.7 | 5.6 | 3.3 | 5.6 | – | 2.9 | 12.5 |
| 10 October 2019 | Dăncilă ousted as Prime Minister following a vote of no confidence from the opposition parties in the Parliament. | | | | | | | | | | | | |
| 9–28 Sep 2019 | IMAS | 1,010 | 19.5 | 27.7 | 17.9 | 5.2 | 5.3 | 9.1 | 6.2 | 3.3 | – | 5.3 | 8.2 |
| 3–24 Sep 2019 | USR | 1,500 | 25.3 | 36.8 | 21.2 | | 2.9 | 5.6 | – | 3.2 | – | 5.2 | 11.5 |
| 16–20 Sep 2019 | Socio-Data | 1,070 | 25 | 28 | 22 | | 5 | 9 | 4 | 5 | – | 2 | 3 |
| 9–13 Sep 2019 | Socio-Data | 1,070 | 26 | 32 | 22 | | 4 | 6 | 5 | 3 | – | 2 | 6 |
| 2–6 Sep 2019 | Socio-Data | 1,070 | 24 | 32 | 21 | | 4 | 9 | 3 | 5 | – | 2 | 8 |
| 26–30 Aug 2019 | Socio-Data | 1,070 | 22 | 26 | 24 | | 4 | 10 | 6 | 5 | – | 3 | 2 |
| 19–31 Aug 2019 | Sociopol | 1,001 | 20 | 35 | 16 | | 3 | 11 | 5 | 5 | – | 5 | 15 |
| 26–30 Aug 2019 | Verifield | 1,000 | 25 | 28 | 23 | | 4 | 8 | 6 | 2 | – | 4 | 3 |
| 5–28 Aug 2019 | IMAS | 1,010 | 17.9 | 28.4 | 19.8 | 5.5 | 4.6 | 8.7 | 7.4 | 2.9 | – | 4.8 | 8.6 |
| 19 Jul–5 Aug 2019 | CURS | 1,600 | 24 | 31 | 20 | | 4 | 7 | 8 | 5 | – | 1 | 7 |
| 15 Jul–2 Aug 2019 | IMAS | 1,010 | 19.4 | 25.5 | 21.4 | 6.0 | 4.2 | 9.0 | 7.3 | 2.9 | – | 4.2 | 4.1 |
| 17–23 Jul 2019 | BCS | 1,128 | 25.4 | 34.2 | 18.6 | | 4.6 | 4.8 | 5.7 | 5.5 | – | 1.1 | 8.8 |
| 28 Jun–8 Jul 2019 | CURS | 1,067 | 26 | 29 | 22 | | 4 | 8 | 5 | 4 | – | 2 | 3 |
| 7–26 Jun 2019 | IMAS | 1,010 | 18.9 | 27.5 | 17.6 | 7.6 | 2.5 | 9.8 | 8.5 | 3.7 | – | 3.8 | 8.6 |
| 27 May 2019 | PSD Leader Liviu Dragnea jailed for 3 years and a half | | | | | | | | | | | | |
| 26 May 2019 | European elections | | 22.5 | 27.0 | 22.4 | | 5.3 | 6.4 | 4.1 | 5.8 | – | 6.5 | 4.5 |
| 2–20 May 2019 | IMAS | 1,010 | 21.4 | 29.3 | 14.4 | 6.3 | 3.3 | 8.0 | 10.2 | 5.5 | – | 1.7 | 7.9 |
| 5–28 Apr 2019 | CURS | 1,500 | 32 | 25 | 12 | | 5 | 9 | 10 | 5 | – | 2 | 7 |
| 12–25 Mar 2019 | CURS | 1,067 | 31 | 23 | 13 | | 5 | 8 | 10 | 6 | – | 4 | 8 |
| 1–21 Feb 2019 | IMAS | 1,010 | 23.4 | 23.6 | 10.5 | 8.0 | 5.0 | 11.1 | 12.4 | 3.5 | – | 2.5 | 0.2 |
| 21 Jan–6 Feb 2019 | CURS | 1,067 | 31 | 21 | 9 | 4 | 5 | 8 | 10 | 5 | – | 7 | 10 |
| 28 Jan–4 Feb 2019 | Sociopol | 1,003 | 33 | 20 | 9 | 6 | 4 | 8 | 11 | 2 | – | 7 | 13 |
| 11–30 Jan 2019 | IMAS | 1,011 | 25.3 | 22.1 | 11.0 | 8.9 | 4.4 | 8.1 | 13.4 | 3.8 | – | 3.2 | 3.2 |
| 12–20 Jan 2019 | BCS | —N/a | 23.0 | 23.7 | 6.5 | 8.1 | 4.8 | 10.7 | 8.1 | 9.3 | – | 5.8 | 0.7 |
| Jan 2019 | PNL | 26,000 | 30.2 | 27.0 | 10.2 | 5.0 | 5.0 | 5.5 | 11.6 | 4.2 | – | 1.3 | 3.2 |
| 4–20 Dec 2018 | IMAS | 1,010 | 25.2 | 26.1 | 11.5 | 8.1 | 4.6 | 6.2 | 9.6 | 2.5 | – | 6.2 | 0.9 |
| 24 Nov–9 Dec 2018 | CURS | 1,067 | 33 | 20 | 7 | 5 | 6 | 9 | 9 | 5 | – | 6 | 13 |
| Nov 2018 | IMAS | 1,010 | 24.9 | 23.3 | 14.8 | 8.2 | 5.8 | – | 11.7 | 2.1 | – | 9.2 | 1.6 |
| Oct 2018 | IMAS | —N/a | 27.6 | 21.9 | 13.1 | 9.6 | 4.7 | – | 10.6 | 4.1 | – | 8.4 | 5.7 |
| 6–7 Oct 2018 | Constitutional referendum fails due to insufficient turnout | | | | | | | | | | | | |
| 3–4 Oct 2018 | Sociopol | 873 | 38 | 23 | 6 | 5 | 4 | 5 | 10 | 1 | – | 8 | 15 |
| 20 Sep–1 Oct 2018 | CURS | 1,067 | 37 | 22 | 8 | 5 | 5 | 6 | 9 | 5 | – | 3 | 15 |
| Sep 2018 | IMAS | —N/a | 28.1 | 27.1 | 9.5 | 10.1 | 5.6 | – | 11.4 | 2.7 | – | 5.5 | 1.0 |
| 22–27 Sep 2018 | Sociopol | 1,004 | 34 | 20 | 10 | 4 | 4 | 7 | 11 | 2 | – | 8 | 16 |
| 7–20 Aug 2018 | Sociopol | 1,005 | 35 | 19 | 13 | 4 | 4 | 3 | 10 | 3 | – | 5 | 16 |
| Jul 2018 | IRI | —N/a | 26 | 24 | 7 | 5 | 1 | – | 6 | 3 | – | 28 | 2 |
| Jun 2018 | IMAS | 1,200 | 28.4 | 29.2 | 11.3 | 8.0 | 5.0 | – | 8.6 | 2.8 | – | 6.7 | 0.8 |
| 23 Jun–1 Jul 2018 | CURS | 1,067 | 37 | 24 | 7 | 5 | 5 | 5 | 8 | 4 | – | 4 | 13 |
| 22–26 Jun 2018 | Sociopol | 917 | 41 | 20 | 7 | 7 | 4 | 5 | 12 | 1 | – | 3 | 21 |
| 28 May–8 Jun 2018 | Sociopol | 1,003 | 40 | 18 | 9 | 8 | 5 | 3 | 7 | 1 | – | 9 | 22 |
| 27 Apr–8 May 2018 | CURS | 1,067 | 39 | 25 | 6 | 3 | 6 | 3 | 8 | 5 | – | 5 | 14 |
| Mar 2018 | CURS | —N/a | 39 | 27 | 7 | – | – | – | 12 | 5 | – | 10 | 12 |
| 27 Feb–5 Mar 2018 | Sociopol | 1,000 | 34 | 33 | 12 | – | 6 | – | 5 | 5 | – | 5 | 1 |
| 20 February 2018 | PRO Romania is founded, as a split-off from PSD. | | | | | | | | | | | | |
| Feb 2018 | IMAS | 1,010 | 28.6 | 29.4 | 11.2 | – | 6.0 | – | 10.6 | 4.6 | – | 9.6 | 0.8 |
| 29 January 2018 | The Dăncilă Cabinet takes office, with the supply and confidence vote on behalf of the UDMR and other MPs from national minorities. | | | | | | | | | | | | |
| 16 January 2018 | Prime minister Tudose resigns, followed by other ministers. | | | | | | | | | | | | |
| 3–10 Jan 2018 | CURS | 1,068 | 42 | 27 | 5 | 2 | 6 | 2 | 9 | 5 | – | 6 | 15 |
| 24 Nov–7 Dec 2017 | Avangarde | 700 | 46 | 23 | 5 | – | 5 | – | 13 | 4 | – | 4 | 23 |
| Nov 2017 | CURS | 1,067 | 43 | 27 | 5 | – | 6 | – | 9 | 6 | – | 4 | 16 |
| Sep 2017 | IMAS | 1,000 | 38.8 | 30.9 | 6.8 | – | 5.0 | – | 8.1 | 3.0 | – | 7.4 | 7.9 |
| 22 Sep–5 Oct 2017 | Sociopol | —N/a | 61 | 24 | 2 | – | 3 | – | 4 | 3 | – | 3 | 37 |
| 28 Aug–14 Sep 2017 | Sociopol | 1,005 | 51 | 27 | 7 | – | 4 | – | 6 | 3 | – | 2 | 24 |
| 11–23 Aug 2017 | Avangarde | 710 | 46 | 25 | 6 | – | 5 | – | 7 | 4 | – | 7 | 21 |
| 14–29 Jun 2017 | Ministers resign. A motion of no-confidence is passed against the Grindeanu cabinet with PSD support. The Tudose Cabinet is afterwards sworn in. | | | | | | | | | | | | |
| 15–22 Jun 2017 | Avangarde | 781 | 46 | 30 | 9 | – | 3 | – | 6 | 5 | – | 1 | 16 |
| Apr 2017 | IMAS | —N/a | 40.6 | 25.4 | 8.2 | – | – | – | 8.5 | – | – | – | 15.2 |
| 6–14 Mar 2017 | Sociopol | 1,007 | 47 | 21 | 12 | – | 5 | – | 6 | 3 | – | 6 | 26 |
| 18 Jan–5 Mar 2017 | Street protests force the government to withdraw some of its proposed policies | | | | | | | | | | | | |
| Jan 2017 | IMAS | —N/a | 49.0 | 20.7 | 8.3 | – | – | – | 6.8 | – | – | – | 28.3 |
| 4 January 2017 | The Grindeanu Cabinet (PSD–ALDE coalition) assumes office | | | | | | | | | | | | |
| 11 December 2016 | 2016 elections | | 45.5 154 | 20.0 69 | 8.9 30 | – | 6.2 21 | – | 5.6 20 | 5.4 18 | – | 6.3 17 | 25.5 |

== Incidents ==
An 80-year-old man from Teiu, Argeș fell into cardiac arrest and died outside a polling station on election day. He was known to have heart problems.

Two polling stations from Sector 3 of Bucharest had their voting suspended: for about an hour at polling station 551, after a member of the electoral bureau tested positive for COVID-19; and for two and a half hours at station 643, after the death of a voter.

== Results ==
Participation was 33.30% and 5.9 million valid votes were cast. After counting all votes, but before the settlement of any appeals, PSD has won around 29.5% of the votes, PNL around 25.5%, USR PLUS around 15.5%, AUR around 9%, and UDMR around 6%. The high result of the quasi-unknown party AUR was considered a huge surprise, while PMP and PRO Romania both failed to get 5% of the votes required to win any seats.

=== Senate ===
| Party | Votes | % | Seats | +/– |
|---|---|---|---|---|
| Social Democratic Party | 1,732,276 | 29.32 | 47 | –20 |
| National Liberal Party | 1,511,225 | 25.58 | 41 | +11 |
| USR PLUS | 936,862 | 15.86 | 25 | +12 |
| Alliance for the Union of Romanians | 541,935 | 9.17 | 14 | New |
| Democratic Alliance of Hungarians in Romania | 348,262 | 5.89 | 9 | 0 |
| People's Movement Party | 291,484 | 4.93 | 0 | –8 |
| PRO Romania Social Liberal | 244,225 | 4.13 | 0 | –9 |
| Ecologist Party of Romania | 78,654 | 1.33 | 0 | 0 |
| Humanist Power Party (Social-Liberal) | 70,536 | 1.19 | 0 | 0 |
| Greater Romania Party | 38,474 | 0.65 | 0 | 0 |
| National Rebirth Alliance | 23,773 | 0.40 | 0 | New |
| Romanian Socialist Party | 23,093 | 0.39 | 0 | 0 |
| Green Party | 23,085 | 0.39 | 0 | 0 |
| New Romania Party | 19,516 | 0.33 | 0 | 0 |
| Noua Dreaptă | 4,345 | 0.07 | 0 | 0 |
| Social Democratic Workers' Party | 3,855 | 0.07 | 0 | New |
| National Peasant Party Maniu-Mihalache | 2,803 | 0.05 | 0 | New |
| Right Alternative | 2,233 | 0.04 | 0 | New |
| Romanian Nation Party | 2,061 | 0.03 | 0 | New |
| Communists' Party | 763 | 0.01 | 0 | New |
| Re:Start Romania Party | 753 | 0.01 | 0 | New |
| National Unity Bloc | 410 | 0.01 | 0 | 0 |
| National Force Party | 268 | 0.00 | 0 | New |
| Independents | 7,440 | 0.13 | 0 | 0 |
| Total | 5,908,331 | 100.00 | 136 | 0 |
| Valid votes | 5,908,331 | 97.53 | | |
| Invalid/blank votes | 149,429 | 2.47 | | |
| Total votes | 6,057,760 | 100.00 | | |
| Registered voters/turnout | 18,964,642 | 31.94 | | |
Source: BEC

=== Chamber of Deputies ===
| Party | Votes | % | Seats | +/– |
|---|---|---|---|---|
| Social Democratic Party | 1,705,777 | 28.90 | 110 | –44 |
| National Liberal Party | 1,486,401 | 25.19 | 93 | +24 |
| USR PLUS | 906,962 | 15.37 | 55 | +25 |
| Alliance for the Union of Romanians | 535,828 | 9.08 | 33 | New |
| Democratic Alliance of Hungarians in Romania | 339,030 | 5.74 | 21 | 0 |
| People's Movement Party | 284,501 | 4.82 | 0 | –18 |
| PRO Romania Social-Liberal | 241,267 | 4.09 | 0 | –20 |
| Ecologist Party of Romania | 65,807 | 1.12 | 0 | 0 |
| Party of Humanist Power (social-liberal) | 59,465 | 1.01 | 0 | 0 |
| Greater Romania Party | 32,654 | 0.55 | 0 | 0 |
| National Rebirth Alliance | 21,662 | 0.37 | 0 | New |
| Green Party | 20,614 | 0.35 | 0 | 0 |
| Romanian Socialist Party | 19,693 | 0.33 | 0 | 0 |
| Party of the Roma "Pro Europe" | 14,523 | 0.25 | 1 | 0 |
| New Romania Party | 14,089 | 0.24 | 0 | 0 |
| League of Albanians of Romania | 9,029 | 0.15 | 1 | 0 |
| Democratic Forum of Germans in Romania | 7,582 | 0.13 | 1 | 0 |
| Association of Macedonians of Romania | 7,144 | 0.12 | 1 | 0 |
| Hellenic Union of Romania | 6,096 | 0.10 | 1 | 0 |
| Union of the Ukrainians of Romania | 5,457 | 0.09 | 1 | 0 |
| Democratic Union of Slovaks and Czechs | 5,386 | 0.09 | 1 | 0 |
| Community of the Lipovan Russians | 5,146 | 0.09 | 1 | 0 |
| Bulgarian Union of Banat–Romania | 4,853 | 0.08 | 1 | 0 |
| Union of Serbs of Romania | 4,691 | 0.08 | 1 | 0 |
| Association of Italians of Romania | 4,170 | 0.07 | 1 | 0 |
| Union of Armenians of Romania | 3,820 | 0.06 | 1 | 0 |
| Cultural Union of Ruthenians of Romania | 3,779 | 0.06 | 1 | 0 |
| Union of Poles of Romania | 3,750 | 0.06 | 1 | 0 |
| Noua Dreaptă | 3,551 | 0.06 | 0 | 0 |
| Democratic Turkish Union of Romania | 3,539 | 0.06 | 1 | 0 |
| Federation of the Jewish Communities in Romania | 3,509 | 0.06 | 1 | 0 |
| Union of Croats of Romania | 3,345 | 0.06 | 1 | 0 |
| Democratic Union of Turkish-Muslim Tatars | 2,862 | 0.05 | 1 | +1 |
| National Peasant Party Maniu-Mihalache | 2,727 | 0.05 | 0 | 0 |
| Right Alternative | 2,005 | 0.03 | 0 | New |
| Social Democratic Workers' Party | 1,912 | 0.03 | 0 | New |
| Romanian Nation Party | 1,752 | 0.03 | 0 | New |
| Re:Start Romania Party | 537 | 0.01 | 0 | New |
| National Unity Bloc | 293 | 0.00 | 0 | 0 |
| Communists' Party | 213 | 0.00 | 0 | New |
| National Force Party | 148 | 0.00 | 0 | New |
| Independents | 56,346 | 0.95 | 0 | 0 |
| Total | 5,901,915 | 100.00 | 330 | +1 |
| Valid votes | 5,901,915 | 97.43 | | |
| Invalid/blank votes | 155,859 | 2.57 | | |
| Total votes | 6,057,774 | 100.00 | | |
| Registered voters/turnout | 18,964,642 | 31.94 | | |
Source: BEC

== Gallery ==
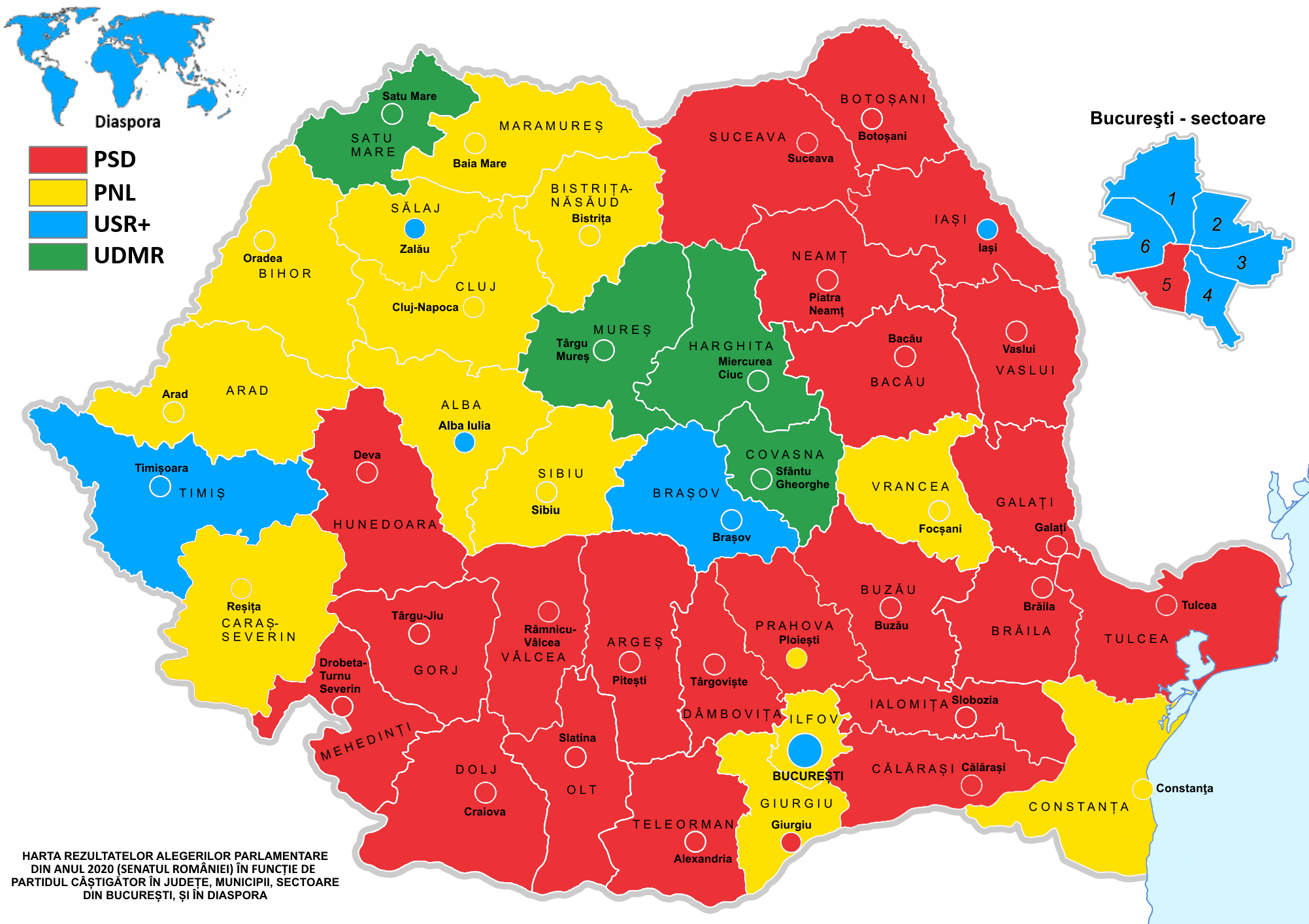
Map highlighting the results for the Senate

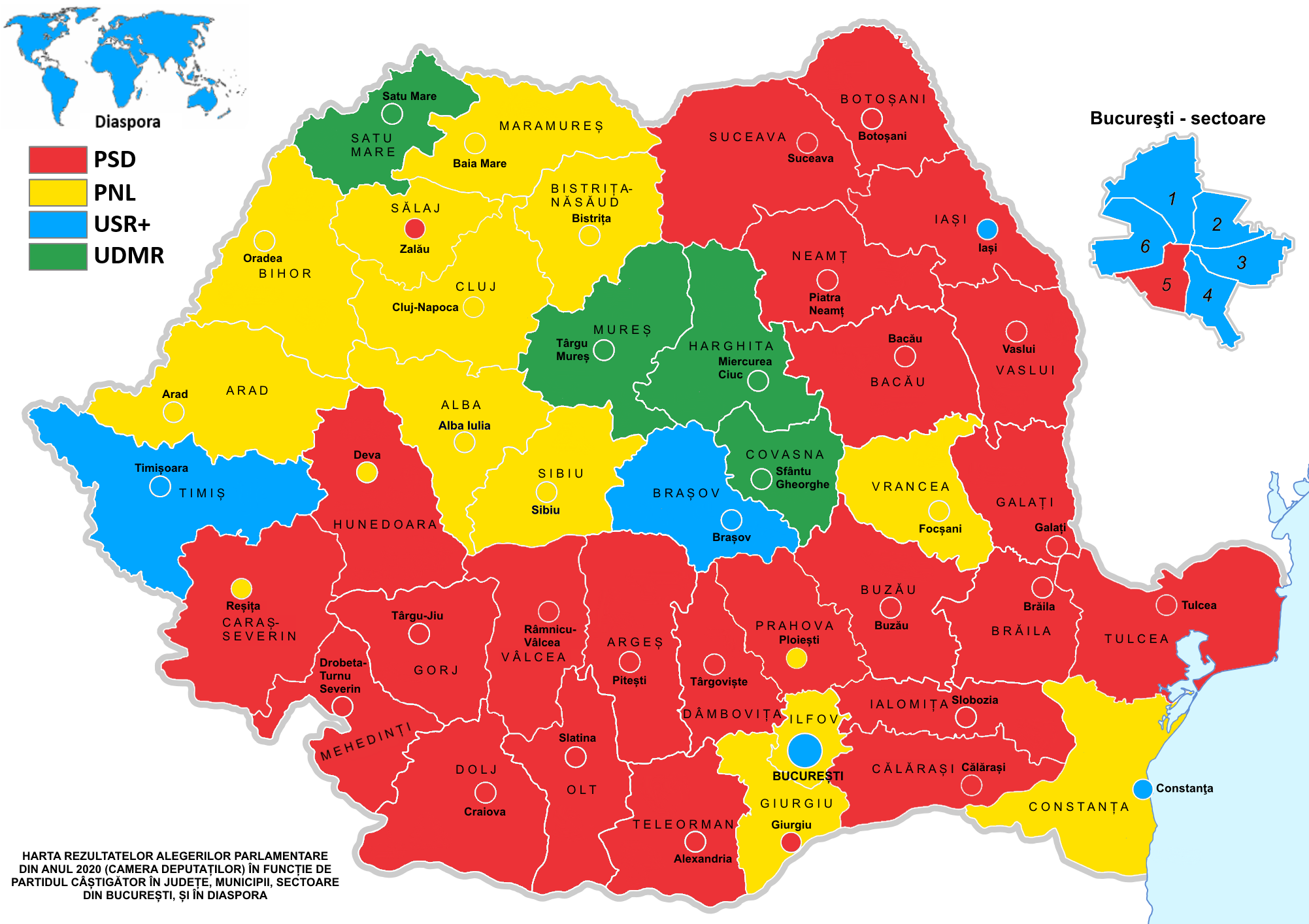
Map highlighting the results for the Chamber of Deputies

Detailed map depicting the winner party by territorial unit at the level of the Senate

Detailed map depicting the winner party by territorial unit at the level of the Chamber of Deputies

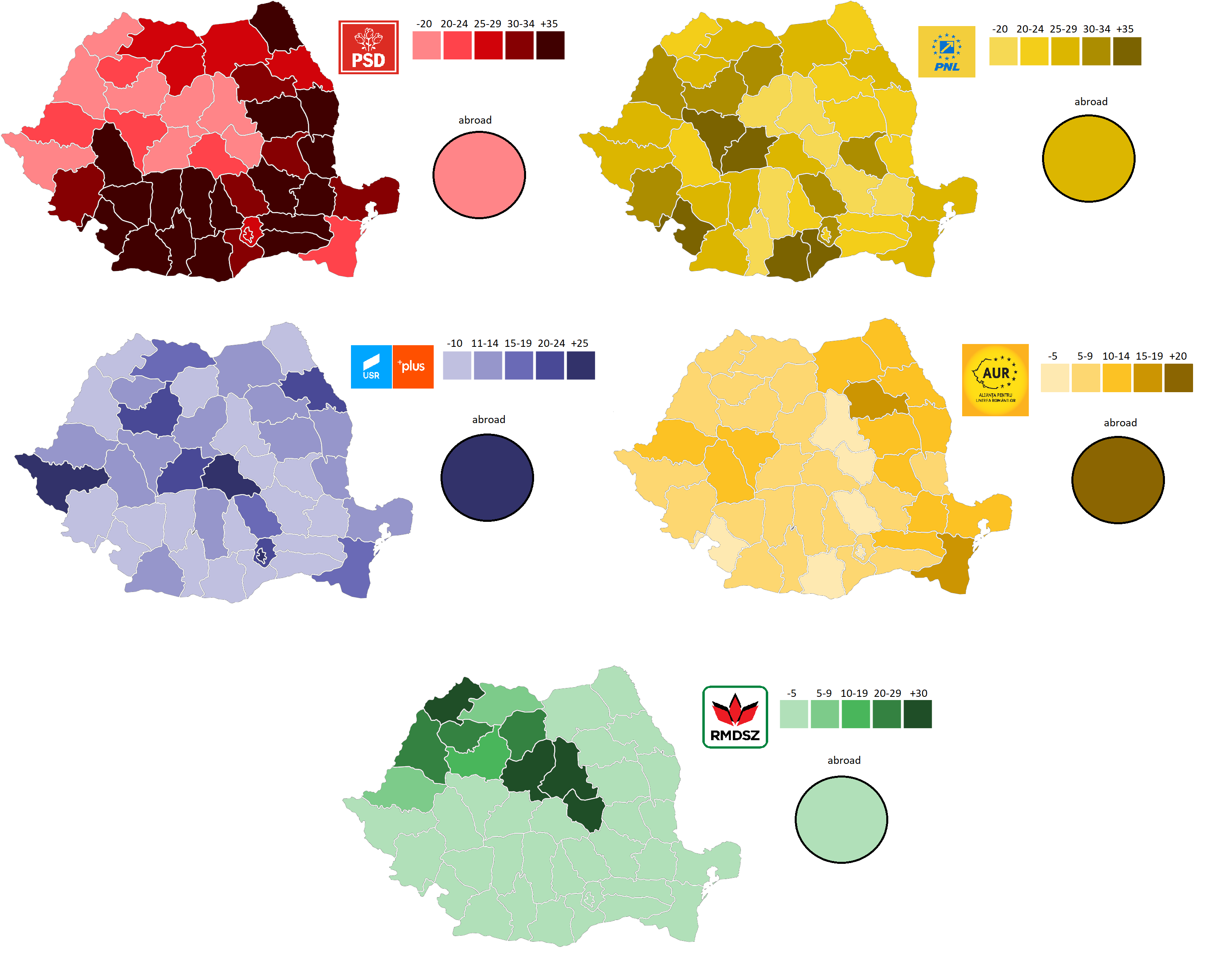
Map depicting the vote strength of each party in each county in the election

== Aftermath ==
On 18 December 2020 the National Liberal Party (PNL), the USR PLUS, and the Democratic Alliance of Hungarians in Romania (UDMR/RMDSZ) announced that they had reached a coalition agreement, and proposed finance minister Florin Cîțu as prime minister. The government would have two deputy prime ministers (one from USR PLUS and one from UDMR) and 18 ministries, with 9 allocated for the PNL, 6 for USR PLUS, and 3 for UDMR. The allocations are as follows (with newly created ministries italicized):

- PNL: Foreign Affairs Ministry, Defense Ministry, Finance Ministry, Interior Ministry, Education Ministry, Energy Ministry, Agriculture Ministry, Labor Ministry, and Culture Ministry
- USR PLUS: Justice Ministry, Transport Ministry, Health Ministry, Ministry of Research, Innovation and Digitization, and the Ministry of Economy, Entrepreneurship and Tourism
- UDMR: Ministry of Development, Public Works and Administration, the Ministry of Environment, Waters and Forests, and the Ministry of Youth and Sports

Cîțu was officially appointed as Prime Minister-designate on 22 December by President Klaus Iohannis. On 23 December, the Cabinet was invested by the parliament and took oath of office on the same evening.

The Romanian Electoral Authority stated that the campaign financing publicly subsidies amounted to a grand total of 166,850,315.50 Romanian Lei. The parties/candidates were required to achieve at least 3% of the vote to apply for a public subsidy of their campaign expenditures.

== See also ==
- 2021 Romanian political crisis
