= Communists' Party (Nepeceriști) =

Communist political party in Romania

Communists' Party Partidul Comuniștilor
- Abbreviation: PC
- President: Gheorghe Ungureanu
- Secretary: Constantin Gălbeoru
- Founded: March 1996
- Ideology: Communism; Neo-Stalinism; Left-wing nationalism Dacianism
- Political position: Far-left
- Colours: Red
- Chamber of Deputies: 0 / 330
- Senate: 0 / 136
- European Parliament: 0 / 33

Website
- Facebook page

Communists' Party (Nepeceriști) (Romanian: Partidul Comuniștilor (Nepecerişti), PCN) is a Romanian communist party, officially registered 31 July 2006. The term Nepeceriști means people who were not members of the Romanian Communist Party (PCR).

The party president is Gheorghe I. Ungureanu and the secretary is Constantin M. Gălbeoru.

== History ==
The party was founded in March 1996. On 19 April 1996, the Bucharest District Court dismissed Ungureanu's application to register the party, holding that the party's announced intent to establish a "humane State" founded on communist doctrine, implied that the post-1989 Romanian constitutional and legal order was, in the later words of the European Court of Human Rights "inhumane and not based on genuine democracy".

The court's decision was upheld 28 August 1996 by the Bucharest Court of Appeal, but was overturned by the European Court of Human Rights under Article 11 of the European Convention on Human Rights, and the party was registered 31 July 2006. However, in 2008 it was dissolved again by the authorities, although in the official "Political Parties Register" was still listed as active, since the party appealed the verdict and won the case.

It was dissolved in 2014.

The party was reformed under the name Communists' Party in 2016, and participated in the 2020 Romanian parliamentary election, gathering 213 votes nationwide.

During the 2024 Romanian presidential election, the party called for a boycott of the first round, and endorsed far-right candidate Călin Georgescu in the second round.

During the 2025 Romanian presidential election, the party endorsed George Simion.
