= Freedom, Unity and Solidarity Party =

Freedom, Unity and Solidarity Party Partidul Libertate, Unitate și Solidaritate
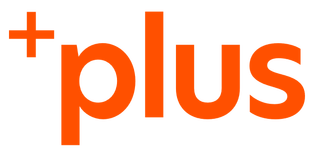
- Abbreviation: PLUS
- President: Dacian Cioloș
- Founded: 15 December 2018
- Dissolved: 16 April 2021
- Merged into: USR
- Succeeded by: REPER (unofficially)
- Headquarters: Strada Finlanda, 15, Bucharest
- Ideology: Liberalism; Pro-Europeanism
- Political position: Centre
- National affiliation: 2020 USR-PLUS Alliance (2019–2021)
- European Parliament group: Renew Europe
- Colors: Orange

Website
- www.ro.plus

The Party of Liberty, Unity and Solidarity (Romanian: Partidul Libertate, Unitate și Solidaritate, PLUS) was a pro-European, liberal political party established on 26 October 2018, whose president was Dacian Cioloș, former Prime Minister of Romania from 2015 until 2017, elected on 26 January 2019. The party had its origin in the Movement Romania Together (MRÎ), a project which they gave up due to the setting up delay in court. The party merged in 2021 with the Save Romania Union (USR) with which it has been in a political alliance called 2020 USR-PLUS Alliance from 2019 to 2021, then formally activating as a sole, unified party known as USR PLUS (subsequently renamed back to Save Romania Union or USR for short).

== History ==
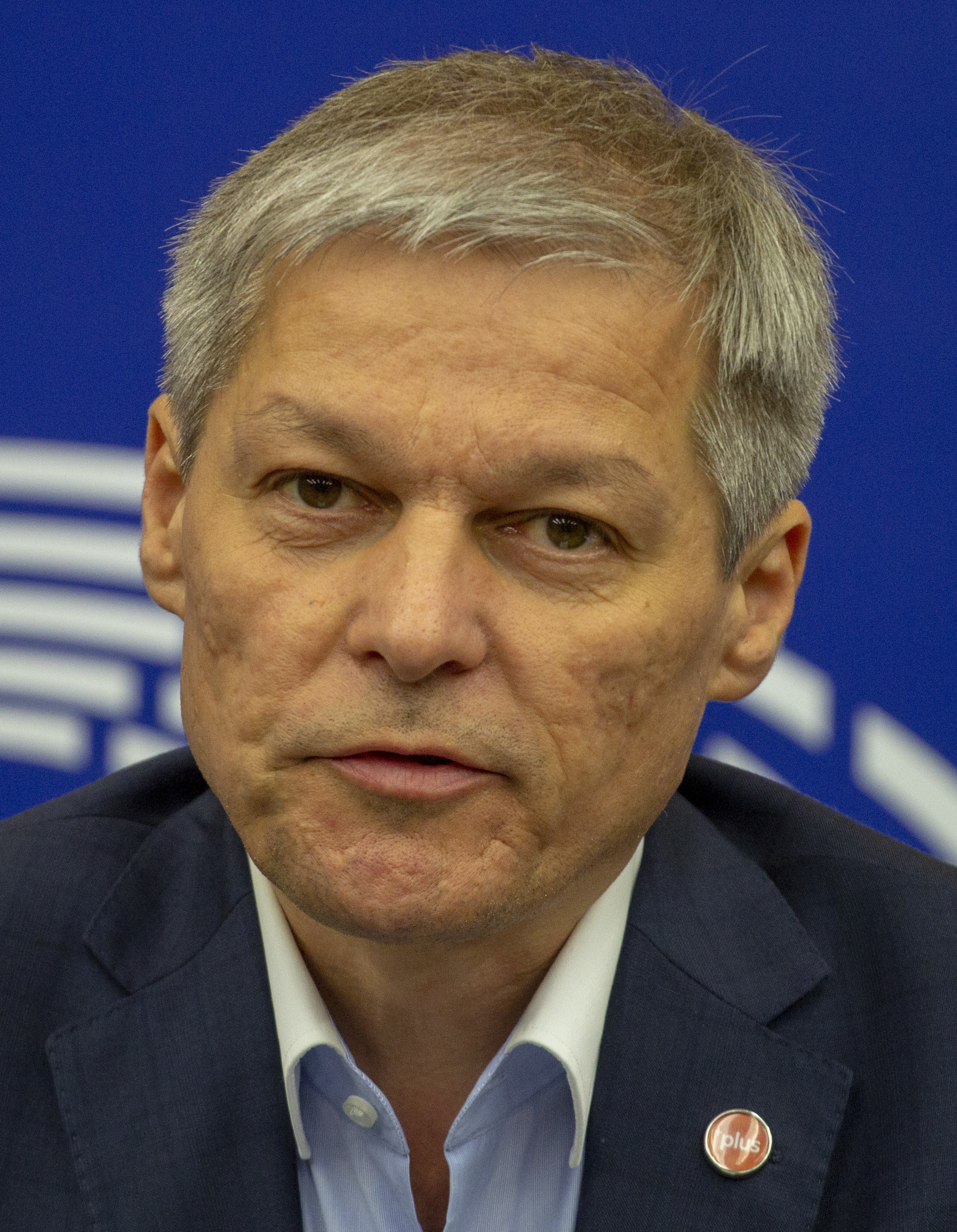
Dacian Cioloș, president of PLUS in July 2019

On 30 March 2018, former Prime Minister of Romania Dacian Cioloș announced his plans to establish a new political party, the Romania Together Movement (Mișcarea România Împreună), together with some of the former members of the Cioloș Cabinet, such as Dragoș Pîslaru, Vlad Voiculescu, Alin Mituța, Dragoș Tudorache, and Anca Dragu. Despite the party gaining notoriety in the subsequent months and appearing in various opinion polls, its official registration was never finalized due to various appeals and delays in the legal process, which Cioloș claimed to be politically motivated.

After almost 9 months, on 15 December, Cioloș announced in Cluj-Napoca that the Freedom, Unity and Solidarity Party (Partidul Libertății, Unității și Solidarității, PLUS) was registered by three of his colleagues, "who share the same values, the same principles, anonymous people, but who wanted to offer a helping hand". He also claimed that the former effort, the Romania Together Movement, will be abandoned and that he and his team will focus on the development of PLUS. After the announcement, more than 7,500 people requested to join the party in 24 hours.

The first National Convention of PLUS, which had the role of electing the president and the National Council of the organization, took place in Bucharest on 26 January 2019. Dacian Cioloș was elected president with 99.17% of the votes. Having previously announced his intention to participate in the European Parliament elections, Cioloș was also chosen to lead the PLUS list for the elections.

MEP Cristian Preda announced on 29 January that he is joining PLUS, allowing the party to have delegates in all polling stations.

On the evening of 2 February 2019, it was announced on Facebook that PLUS and the Save Romania Union (USR) established the 2020 USR-PLUS Alliance, which will participate in the 2019 European Parliament elections.

While the party was not a member of Alliance of Liberals and Democrats for Europe Party (ALDE), all its MEPs were individual members of this European political party.

== Ideology ==
PLUS has not defined its ideology clearly. However, a manifesto was published on the party's website expressing support for liberty, social justice, transparency in public administration, as well as commitment to Romania's EU and NATO membership. Cioloș, the party's president, claimed in an interview that PLUS is situated in "the centre, centre-right area".

== Electoral history ==
=== Legislative elections ===
Election	Chamber			Senate			Position	Aftermath
Election	Votes	%	Seats	Votes	%	Seats	Position	Aftermath
2016	did not exist		0 / 329	did not exist		0 / 136	–	Extra-parliamentary opposition to PSD-ALDE government (2018–2019)
2016	did not exist		0 / 329	did not exist		0 / 136	–	Extra-parliamentary opposition to PSD minority government (2019)
2016	did not exist		0 / 329	did not exist		0 / 136	–	Extra-parliamentary support for PNL minority government (2019–2020)
2020	906,962	15.37	17 / 330	936,862	15.86	8 / 136	3rd (within USR PLUS)	PNL-USR PLUS-UDMR government (2020–2021)
2020	906,962	15.37	17 / 330	936,862	15.86	8 / 136	3rd (within USR PLUS)	Merged with USR (April 2021)

=== Local elections ===
Election	County Councilors (CJ)			Mayors			Local Councilors (CL)			Popular vote	%	Position
Election	Votes	%	Seats	Votes	%	Seats	Votes	%	Seats	Popular vote	%	Position
2020	478,659	6.65	29 / 1,340	490,362	6.58	8 / 3,176	504,563	6.85	351 / 39,900	696,478	8.89	3rd (within USR PLUS)

=== Presidential elections ===
Election	Candidate	First round			Second round		
Election	Candidate	Votes	Percentage	Position	Votes	Percentage	Position
2019	Dan Barna^{1}	1,384,450	15.02%	3rd	not qualified		

Notes:

^{1} Dan Barna was the candidate endorsed by the 2020 USR-PLUS Alliance.

=== European elections ===
Election	Votes	%	MEPs	Position	EU Party	EP Group
2019	2,028,236	22.36	4 / 32	3rd (within USR-PLUS)^{1}	ALDE (Note: Dacian Cioloş, Dragoș Nicolae Pîslaru, Ioan Dragoș Tudorache, and Ramona Victoria Strugariu as ALDE individual members)	RE

Notes:

^{1} 2020 USR-PLUS Alliance members: USR (4 MEPs) and PLUS.
