= Liberal Reformist Party (Romania) =

Liberal Reformist Party Partidul Liberal Reformator
- President: Călin Popescu-Tăriceanu
- Founded: 3 July 2014
- Dissolved: 19 June 2015
- Split from: National Liberal Party (PNL)
- Merged into: Alliance of Liberals and Democrats (ALDE)
- Headquarters: Bucharest
- Youth wing: Liberal Reformist Youth – TLR
- Ideology: Liberalism
- Political position: Centre-right
- Colors: Blue and White

Website
- plr-liberalii.ro

The Liberal Reformist Party (Romanian: Partidul Liberal Reformator, PLR) was a minor centre-right and liberal political party in Romania, founded on 3 July 2014 by former PNL president Călin Popescu-Tăriceanu. In February 2014 the National Liberal Party (PNL) split from the Social Liberal Union (USL) alliance with the Social Democratic Party (PSD) and later in July 2014 joined the European People's Party (EPP) group in the European Parliament. Călin Popescu-Tăriceanu, along with almost 30 MPs, left the PNL to establish a new liberal party in Romania, intending to become the Romanian member of ALDE and the Liberal International. The party's first congress was held on 1–2 August 2014. On 19 June 2015 the PLR merged with the Conservative Party (PC) to form the Alliance of Liberals and Democrats (ALDE).

== Controversies ==
Tăriceanu has been accused by President Băsescu of interfering with justice in Dinu Patriciu's benefit.

On 24 January 2006, Monica Macovei, then Minister of Justice, made public a meeting with Tăriceanu which took place 7 months before (in June 2005), and to which Tăriceanu invited Dinu Patriciu. Patriciu complained to Macovei about alleged procedural problems regarding his case. Macovei accused Tăriceanu of interfering with justice. On 20 February 2006 Tăriceanu declared on TVR1:" I recognise my fault. I didn't act correctly. But I didn't influence justice."(in Romanian) "Îmi recunosc vina. Nu am procedat corect. Dar nu am influenţat justiţia"

Elena Udrea recalled that, while she was Presidential Counsellor, she saw a note written by Tăriceanu. In a few days President Băsescu found the note and made it public, saying that "The Prime Minister suggested to me a partnership, but, unfortunately, with our oligarchies"(in Romanian) "Domnul prim-ministru îmi propunea un parteneriat, dar, din păcăte, cu oligarhiile noastre". The note was about a complaint from Petromidia about the 27 May procedure problems:

Dear Traian,
1. I send you annexed a document released by Petromidia, regarding the ongoing investigations.
2. If you have the opportunity to speak at the Prosecuting Magistracy about the subject?

In May 2007, Patriciu won a lawsuit against the Romanian Intelligence Service (SRI), which illegally tapped his phones for two years. He received from SRI 50,000 RON as moral prejudice.

== Electoral history ==
=== Presidential elections ===
Election	Candidate	First round			Second round		
Election	Candidate	Votes	Percentage	Position	Votes	Percentage	Position
2014	Călin Popescu-Tăriceanu^{1}	508,572	5.36%	3rd			

Notes:

^{1} Because PLR did not manage to register in time for the elections, Călin Popescu-Tăriceanu was forced to file his candidacy as an independent.
