= PRO Romania =

PRO Romania PRO România
- Abbreviation: PRO
- President: Vacant
- Secretary-General: Alin Văcaru
- Spokesperson: Gabriela Podașcă
- Founders: Victor Ponta; Sorin Cîmpeanu; Daniel Constantin
- Founded: 29 May 2017; 8 years ago
- Registered: 20 February 2018; 8 years ago
- Split from: Social Democratic Party (PSD); Alliance of Liberals and Democrats (ALDE)
- Ideology: Social liberalism; Social democracy; Nationalism; Progressivism; Pro-Europeanism
- Political position: Centre to centre-left
- European affiliation: Party of European Socialists (observer)
- European Parliament group: Progressive Alliance of Socialists and Democrats
- Colors: Blue; Red; Yellow
- Senate: 0 / 136
- Chamber of Deputies: 1 / 330
- European Parliament: 0 / 33
- Mayors: 0 / 3,176
- County Councilors: 0 / 1,340
- Local Council Councilors: 110 / 39,900

Website
- www.proromaniaonline.ro

PRO Romania (Romanian: PRO România, PRO) is an extra-parliamentary social liberal political party in Romania.

== History ==
The founding of PRO Romania was initiated in 2017 by former Prime Minister Victor Ponta, former acting/ad interim Prime Minister and Minister of Education Sorin Cîmpeanu, and former Deputy Prime Minister and Minister of Environment and Climate Change Daniel Constantin. The party was formally established on 20 February 2018 in Bucharest

Corina Crețu, European Commissioner for Regional Policy, announced on 17 January 2019 that she would be a candidate in the European Parliament election on behalf of PRO Romania. She would be at the second position in the list after Victor Ponta.

Four days later, senator and former Minister of National Defence Adrian Țuțuianu announced that he joined the party, becoming the first senator to join PRO Romania.

In 2019, PRO Romania was represented in the Romanian Parliament by 20 deputies and 1 senator and in the European Parliament by 2 MEPs.

The party joined the European political party European Democratic Party (EDP) in February 2019. However, its MEPs sit in the Progressive Alliance of Socialists and Democrats (PES) and not in the Renew Europe group.

In 2020, the Alliance of Liberals and Democrats (ALDE) merged into PRO Romania, and the expanded party has renamed itself PRO Romania Social-Liberal (Romanian: PRO România Social-Liberal).

Nevertheless, on 26 January 2021, the executive bureau of PRO Romania met to stop the merger procedure between the party and ALDE, thereby formally ceasing the union between the two parties.

In October 2022, the party became an observer member of the Party of European Socialists (PES).

== Members ==
Since its establishment, many high-profile former members of PSD or ALDE have joined PRO Romania, including:

- Nicolae Bănicioiu - member of the Chamber of Deputies and former Minister of Health;
- Ioana Petrescu - former Minister of Finance;
- Augustin Jianu - former Minister of Communications and Information Society;
- Mircea Dobre - member of the Chamber of Deputies and former Minister of Tourism;
- Gabriela Podașcă, Cătălin Nechifor, Mircea Banias, Emilia Meiroșu, Mihaela Huncă, Eugen Durbacă, Alin Văcaru, Adrian Pau - members of the Chamber of Deputies;
- Răzvan Cotovelea - former Minister of Communications and Information Society;
- Adrian Țuțuianu - senator and former Minister of National Defence.

== Electoral history ==
=== Legislative elections ===
Election	Chamber			Senate			Position	Aftermath
Election	Votes	%	Seats	Votes	%	Seats	Position	Aftermath
2016	did not exist^{1}		21 / 329	did not exist		0 / 136	—	PSD-ALDE government (2017–2018)
2016	did not exist^{1}		21 / 329	did not exist		0 / 136	—	Opposition to PSD-ALDE government (2018–2019)
2016	did not exist^{1}		21 / 329	did not exist		0 / 136	—	Opposition to PSD minority government (2019)
2016	did not exist^{1}		21 / 329	did not exist		0 / 136	—	Endorsing PNL minority government (2019–2020)
2016	did not exist^{1}		21 / 329	did not exist		0 / 136	—	Opposition to PNL minority government (2020)
2020	236,454	4.16	0 / 330	238,888	4.19	0 / 136	7th	Extra-parliamentary opposition to PNL-USR PLUS-UDMR government (2020–2021)
2020	236,454	4.16	0 / 330	238,888	4.19	0 / 136	7th	Extra-parliamentary opposition to PNL-UDMR minority government (2021)
2020	236,454	4.16	0 / 330	238,888	4.19	0 / 136	7th	Extra-parliamentary endorsement for CNR government (2021–present)

Notes:

^{1} The MPs were elected on PSD's and ALDE's lists.

=== Local elections ===
Election	County Councilors (CJ)			Mayors			Local Councilors (CL)			Popular vote	%	Position
Election	Votes	%	Seats	Votes	%	Seats	Votes	%	Seats	Popular vote	%	Position
2020	356,030	4.95	56 / 1,340	331,854	4.09	36 / 3,176	381,535	4.76	1,885 / 39,900	—N/a	—N/a	5th
2024	17.633	–.2,06	0 / 1,340	18.063	–	0 / 3,176	29.505	3.34	110 / 39,900	—N/a	—N/a	17th

=== Presidential elections ===
Election	Candidate	First round			Second round		
Election	Candidate	Votes	Percentage	Position	Votes	Percentage	Position
2019	Mircea Diaconu^{1}	815,201	8.85%	4th	not qualified		
2025	Victor Ponta^{1}	1,230,164	13.04%	4th	not qualified		

Notes:

^{1} Mircea Diaconu was the candidate of the "One Man" (Romanian: Un om) alliance; The alliance's members were PRO Romania and ALDE.

=== European elections ===
Election	Votes	Percentage	MEPs	Position	EU Party	EP Group
2019	583,916	6.44%	2 / 32	4th	EDP	S&D
2024	not participated					
