= USR PLUS =

Romanian electoral alliance

- Leaders: Dan Barna (USR); Dacian Cioloș (PLUS)
- Founded: 2 February 2019
- Dissolved: 16 April 2021
- Succeeded by: Save Romania Union
- Ideology: Anti-corruption; Progressivism; Liberalism; Economic liberalism; Populism; Pro-Europeanism
- Political position: Centre
- European affiliation: Alliance of Liberals and Democrats for Europe Party
- European Parliament group: Renew Europe
- Colours: Blue; Orange
- Slogan: O Românie fără hoție ('A Romania without thievery')
- Constituent parties: USR; PLUS

Website
- www.usrplus.ro

USR PLUS was a Romanian progressive, liberal, and centrist political alliance active between 2019 and 2021. Established on 2 February 2019 solely as an electoral alliance between the political parties Save Romania Union (USR) and the Freedom, Unity and Solidarity Party (PLUS) it was initially called 2020 USR-PLUS Alliance (Romanian: Alianța 2020 USR-PLUS). The alliance was formed to participate together in the May 2019 European Parliament election in Romania.

Subsequently, the two parties decided to sign a protocol for a political alliance for the 2019 Romanian presidential election and for the 2020 local and legislative elections as well.

The alliance was dissolved when the two parties formally merged after a successful vote during an online congress on 15 August 2020 and the approval of this event by the Court of Appeal of Bucharest on 16 April 2021. Furthermore, the party celebrated in early October 2021 a new congress where Dacian Cioloș was elected to be the sole president of the party. In the same congress, the 24 members of the party's National Political Bureau were elected and the congress voted to conserve Save Romania Union as the statutory name of the party, setting aside provisions in the merger protocol recommending that the name be changed to USR PLUS.

== History ==
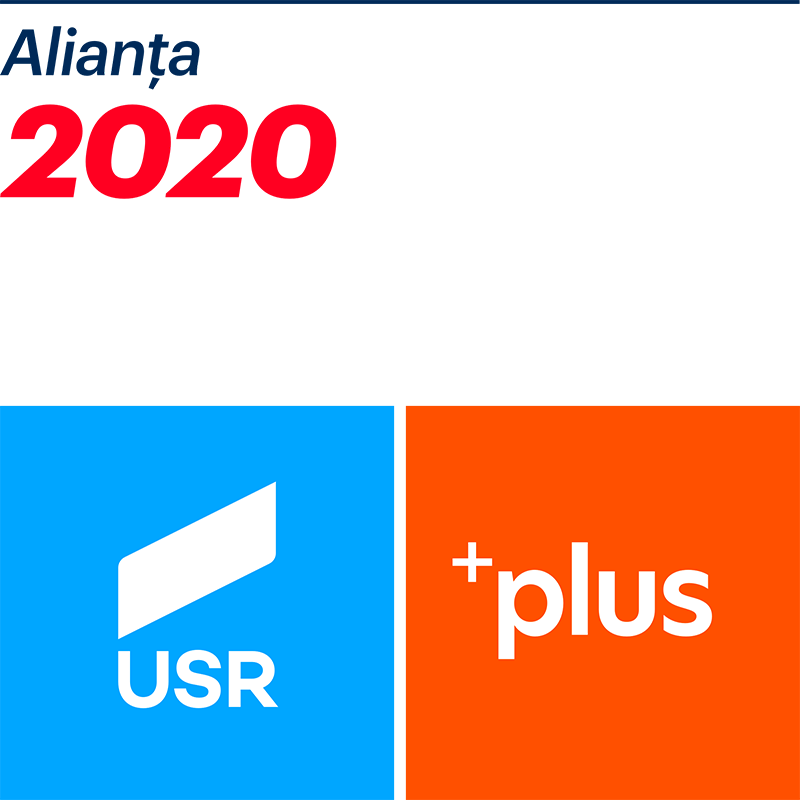
Logo of USR PLUS when it was an electoral alliance

Dan Barna (USR) and Dacian Cioloș (PLUS), as leaders of the alliance, declared on 2 February 2019 that the two parties reached an agreement to participate jointly in European elections and that the project was a first step towards a possible success in the 2020 Romanian legislative election.

On 7 March 2019, the Central Electoral Bureau (BEC) rejected the application for registration of the 2020 USR-PLUS Alliance for the European Parliament elections, motivating that Barna and Cioloș were not listed as presidents of the two parties in the Register of Political Parties. Barna was elected president of the USR in October 2017, and Cioloș was elected president of the PLUS in February 2019. Both requested their registration as presidents at the Bucharest Tribunal, but until the Alliance's registration they did not receive a final decision. Deputy Nicușor Dan, former president of the USR, declared that "I found, together with the legal team, the solution that would allow me to legally countersign the protocol of the USR-PLUS Alliance". On March 8, the High Court of Cassation and Justice accepted USR-PLUS' appeal to the decision of the BEC not to allow the alliance to be registered. The alliance's chosen slogan used to be Fără hoție ajungem departe, meaning "Without thievery we go far" and referring to the existing corruption in Romania. Nowadays, the slogan is O Românie fără hoție ("A Romania without thievery").

On 15 August 2020, members of the USR and PLUS held an online congress to decide whether to formally unite the two parties or not, with 84.65% of the participants voting in favor of a merger. This new party would still be called USR (Save Romania Union) and would be led by Barna and Cioloș until a judicial decision on the merger was made; then, the party would be renamed to "USR PLUS".

The parties, USR and PLUS, officially and legally merged into one single party on 16 April 2021 after the approval of this by the Court of Appeal of Bucharest. In addition, the party was said to be preparing for a new congress, probably held in the autumn of 2021, to vote a single leadership, with Barna and Cioloș announcing that they would both participate in this vote.

In early October 2021, Dacian Cioloș was elected president of the party in the congress. Subsequently, the 24 members of the National Political Bureau were elected, while it was decided that the statutory name of the party remains Save Romania Union.

== 2019 European Parliament elections ==
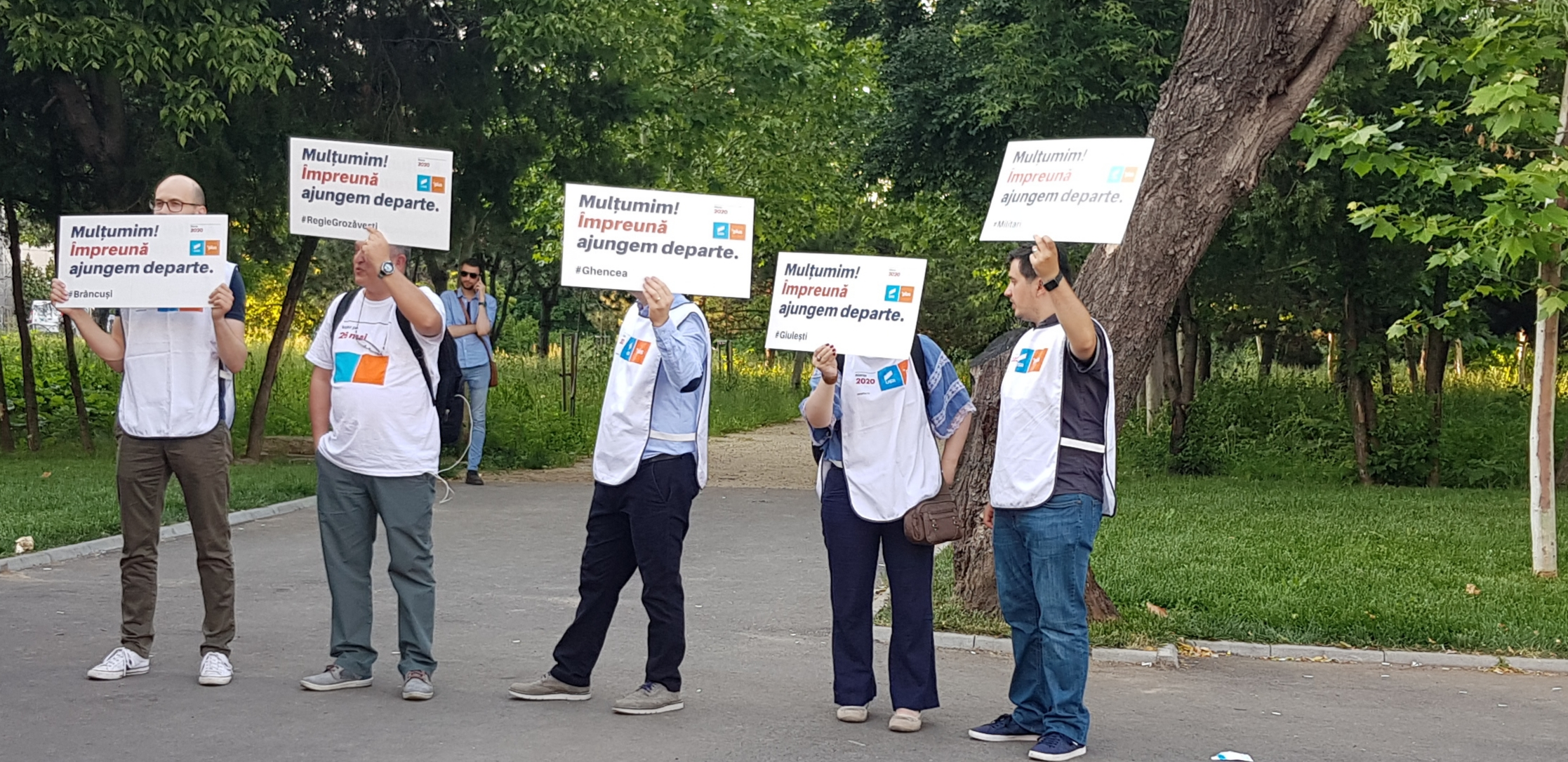
Members of the USR PLUS (then still an electoral alliance) thanking the people of Bucharest for the victory in the European Parliament elections of May 2019

On 4 April 2019, the 2020 USR-PLUS Alliance presented, during a press conference, its party platform for the European Parliament elections. The alliance's electoral offer covers four main subjects: "Justice and protection of the rights of the Romanians in the European Union", "welfare for society: health, education and anti-poverty measures", "European prosperity at home, in Romania", and "foreign and secure policy". Among the promises of the alliance are the creation of an applicable European Mechanism for Cooperation and Verification, Romania's accession to the Schengen Area and changes in education, agriculture and infrastructure. The alliance also supports the Accession of Moldova to the European Union.

On the occasion of the European Council meeting of May 9 in Sibiu, Romania, Ciolos had a meeting with Emmanuel Macron, President of France, focused on a discussion on the creation of a new political group in the European Parliament after the elections of May 26.

During the political campaign, the alliance organized two major party rallies attended by both leaders of the alliance, one on May 5 in Cluj-Napoca and the other one on May 12 in Timișoara. The Bucharest rally of 24 May was also attended by Guy Verhofstadt, leader of the ALDE Group in the European Parliament, who announced the formation of a new Pro-European reformist center parliamentary group, together with the La République En Marche! of Emmanuel Macron.

== Electoral history ==
=== Legislative elections ===
Election	Chamber			Senate			Position	Aftermath
Election	Votes	%	Seats	Votes	%	Seats	Position	Aftermath
2016	did not exist^{1}		30 / 329	did not exist		13 / 136	–	Opposition to PSD-ALDE government (2019)
2016	did not exist^{1}		30 / 329	did not exist		13 / 136	–	Opposition to PSD minority government (2019)
2016	did not exist^{1}		30 / 329	did not exist		13 / 136	–	Supporting PNL minority government (2019–2020)
2020	906,962	15.37	55 / 330	936,862	15.86	25 / 136	3rd	PNL-USR PLUS-UDMR government (2020–2021)

Notes

^{1} All MPs were members of USR (PLUS had no seats in parliament at the time).

=== Local elections ===
Election	County Councillors (CJ)			Mayors			Local Councillors (CL)			Popular vote	%	Position
Election	Votes	%	Seats	Votes	%	Seats	Votes	%	Seats	Popular vote	%	Position
2020	478,659	6.65	65 / 1,340	490,362	6.58	28 / 3,176	504,563	6.85	1,207 / 39,900	696,478	8.89	3rd

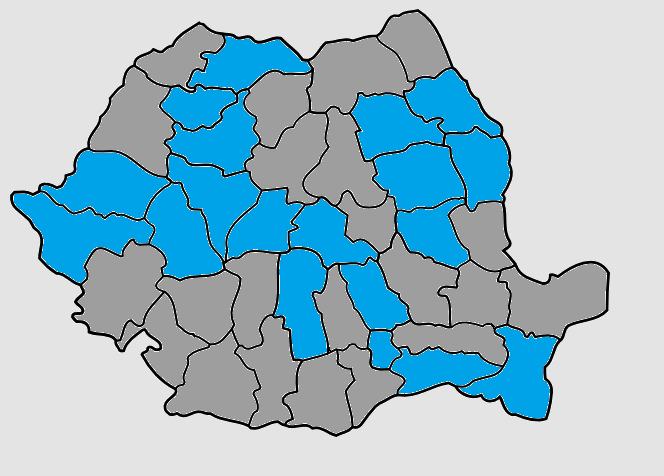
Map of the results of the 2020 Romanian local elections. In blue are the counties in which USR-PLUS gained County Councillors (CJ) and in gray are the counties in which it did not pass the threshold to do so.

County	Election	Votes	%	Councillors	+/-	Aftermath
Alba	2020	13,949	9.5 (#3)	4 / 32	▲4	Opposition
Arad	2020	20,712	12.8 (#2)	5 / 32	▲5	Opposition
Argeș	2020	26,594	10.7 (#3)	4 / 34	▲4	Opposition
Bacău	2020	61,621	27.0 (#2)	3 / 36	▲3	Opposition
Bihor	2020	5,741	2.3 (#5)	0 / 34	0	Extra-parliamentary
Bistrița-Năsăud	2020	5,476	4.4 (#4)	0 / 30	0	Extra-parliamentary
Botoșani	2020	5,539	3.6 (#5)	0 / 32	0	Extra-parliamentary
Brăila	2020	5,837	5.3 (#4)	0 / 30	0	Extra-parliamentary
Brașov	2020	39,013	19.3 (#3)	8 / 34	▲8	PNL–USR-PLUS
Bucharest	2020	175,953	27.0 (#2)	17 / 55	▲2	USR-PLUS–PNL
Buzău	2020	11,866	6.6 (#4)	0 / 32	0	Extra-parliamentary
Călărași	2020	46,932	37.3 (#2)	4 / 30	▲4	Opposition
Caraș-Severin	2020	6,281	5.3 (#4)	0 / 30	0	Extra-parliamentary
Cluj	2020	30,701	12.2 (#3)	5 / 36	▲5	Opposition
Constanța	2020	34,896	13.0 (#3)	5 / 36	▲5	PNL–USR-PLUS
Covasna	2020	1,836	2.7 (#9)	0 / 30	0	Extra-parliamentary
Dâmbovița	2020	6,054	2.9 (#5)	0 / 34	0	Extra-parliamentary
Dolj	2020	17,563	6.7 (#4)	0 / 36	0	Extra-parliamentary
Galați	2020	11,844	6.0 (#3)	0 / 34	0	Extra-parliamentary
Giurgiu	2020	4,194	3.4 (#5)	0 / 30	0	Extra-parliamentary
Gorj	2020	6,373	4.2 (#5)	0 / 32	0	Extra-parliamentary
Harghita	2020	1,330	1.3 (#7)	0 / 30	0	Extra-parliamentary
Hunedoara	2020	12,949	7.9 (#4)	2 / 32	▲2	Opposition
Ialomița	2020	6,096	5.7 (#4)	0 / 30	0	Extra-parliamentary
Iași	2020	39,416	14.6 (#3)	6 / 36	▲6	Opposition
Ilfov	2020	26,389	14.5 (#2)	5 / 32	▲5	Opposition
Maramureș	2020	14,143	7.7 (#4)	3 / 34	▲3	PNL–USR-PLUS
Mehedinți	2020	2,876	2.4 (#5)	0 / 30	0	Extra-parliamentary
Mureș	2020	6,908	3.4 (#6)	0 / 34	0	Extra-parliamentary
Neamț	2020	19,564	10.7 (#3)	4 / 34	▲4	Opposition
Olt	2020	5,019	2.5 (#5)	0 / 32	0	Extra-parliamentary
Prahova	2020	131.179	45.9 (#1)	8 / 36	▲8	PNL–USR-PLUS (2020–2021)
Prahova	2020	131.179	45.9 (#1)	8 / 36	▲8	Opposition (2021–present)
Sălaj	2020	6,851	7.0 (#4)	2 / 30	▲2	Support
Satu Mare	2020	7,072	5.4 (#5)	0 / 32	0	Extra-parliamentary
Sibiu	2020	15,573	10.1 (#4)	4 / 32	▲4	Opposition
Suceava	2020	15,751	6.2 (#4)	0 / 36	0	Extra-parliamentary
Teleorman	2020	6,143	3.8 (#3)	0 / 32	0	Extra-parliamentary
Timiș	2020	55.155	21.5 (#2)	10 / 36	▲10	PNL–USR-PLUS (2020)
Timiș	2020	55.155	21.5 (#2)	10 / 36	▲10	Opposition (2020–present)
Tulcea	2020	5,288	6.1 (#4)	0 / 30	0	Extra-parliamentary
Vâlcea	2020	8,319	5.2 (#4)	0 / 32	0	Extra-parliamentary
Vaslui	2020	12,140	8.4 (#4)	3 / 34	▲3	Opposition
Vrancea	2020	58.610	41.0 (#2)	5 / 32	▲5	Support (2020–2021)
Vrancea	2020	58.610	41.0 (#2)	5 / 32	▲5	Opposition (2021–present)

City	Mayor	#	Local Council				
City	Mayor	#	Votes	Percentage	Council	Swing	Aftermath
Sector 1 (Bucharest)	40.95 / 100	1	26.675	30.0 (#2)	9 / 27	▲1	USR-PLUS–PNL (2020–2021)
Sector 1 (Bucharest)	40.95 / 100	1	26.675	30.0 (#2)	9 / 27	▲1	USR-PLUS minority (2021–present)
Sector 2 (Bucharest)	36.91 / 100	1	33,145	29.1 (#2)	9 / 27	▲4	USR-PLUS–PNL
Sector 3 (Bucharest)	28.48 / 100	2	34,236	25.7 (#1)	9 / 31	▲1	Opposition
Sector 4 (Bucharest)	29.88 / 100	2	28,999	28.5 (#2)	9 / 27	▲3	Opposition
Sector 5 (Bucharest)	25.24 / 100	3	14,838	16.5 (#3)	5 / 27	0	Opposition
Sector 6 (Bucharest)	43.40 / 100	1	30,657	24.8 (#3)	8 / 27	▲1	PNL–USR-PLUS
Cluj-Napoca	8.27 / 100	2	16,691	17.1 (#2)	5 / 27	▲5	Opposition
Timișoara	53.25 / 100	1	37.977	41.4 (#1)	13 / 27	▲13	PNL–USR-PLUS (2020)
Timișoara	53.25 / 100	1	37.977	41.4 (#1)	13 / 27	▲13	USR-PLUS minority (2020–present)
Iași	30.31 / 100	2	24,785	29.0 (#2)	9 / 27	▲9	Opposition
Brașov	42.06 / 100	1	26,525	32.7 (#1)	12 / 27	▲12	PNL–USR-PLUS
Constanța	24.31 / 100	2	22,773	23.9 (#2)	9 / 27	▲9	PNL–USR-PLUS

=== Presidential elections ===
Election	Candidate	First round			Second round		
Election	Candidate	Votes	Percentage	Position	Votes	Percentage	Position
2019	Dan Barna	1,384,450	15.02%	3rd	not qualified		

=== European Parliament elections ===
Election	Votes	%	MEPs	Position	EU Party	EP Group
2019	2,028,236	22.36	8 / 32^{1}	3rd	—	RE

Note: ^{1} USR-PLUS members: USR and PLUS (4 MEPs each).

== See also ==
- Politics of Romania
