= Alliance of Liberals and Democrats (Romania) =

Alliance of Liberals and Democrats Alianța Liberalilor și Democraților
- Abbreviation: ALDE
- Founder: Călin Popescu-Tăriceanu
- Founded: 19 June 2015
- Dissolved: 22 March 2022
- Merger of: Liberal Reformist Party (PLR) and Conservative Party (PC)
- Merged into: National Liberal Party
- Ideology: Liberalism (Romanian); Conservative liberalism
- Political position: Centre to centre-right
- National affiliation: PSD–ALDE Alliance (2015–2019)
- Regional affiliation: Liberal South East European Network
- European affiliation: Alliance of Liberals and Democrats for Europe Party (2015–2019)
- International affiliation: Liberal International (observer)
- Colours: Blue; Gold

Website
- alde.ro

The Alliance of Liberals and Democrats (Romanian: Alianța Liberalilor și Democraților, ALDE) was a minor liberal political party in Romania which was officially absorbed in its entirety by the National Liberal Party (PNL), from which it initially seceded in 2015, during late March 2022. Throughout its relatively short political history, it was mostly associated with the Social Democratic Party (PSD) at governance, firstly between 2014 and 2015 and the once more for the last time between 2017 and 2019.

== History ==
The party was founded on 19 June 2015, following a merger of the Liberal Reformist Party (PLR) and the Conservative Party (PC). On 19 November 2015, the party was admitted into the Alliance of Liberals and Democrats for Europe. At the 2016 legislative election which was held on 11 December 2016, ALDE received 5.6% of the vote for the Chamber of Deputies (consequently gaining 20 seats there) as well as 6.0% of the vote at the Senate (consequently gaining 6 seats there).

On 19 December 2016, party co-presidents Călin Popescu-Tăriceanu and Daniel Constantin signed a collaboration protocol with the Social Democratic Party (PSD) leader Liviu Dragnea to form a new coalition government with ALDE as the junior partner. On 30 May 2019, the party withdrew from the Alliance of Liberals and Democrats for Europe. The relation between ALDE Romania and ALDE Europe was strained after the ALDE-supported governmental coalition had passed laws that were deemed by the Venice Commission and ALDE Europe to undermine the independence of the judiciary. The leader of the Alliance of Liberals and Democrats for Europe, Guy Verhofstadt, had also previously participated at a rally of the then oppositional USR PLUS.

Eventually, ALDE Romania withdrew from their coalition with the Social Democratic Party (PSD) on 26 August 2019 and moved into parliamentary opposition until the end of the legislature in 2020. In 2020, ALDE merged with PRO Romania, forming a new political party under the moniker PRO Romania Social-Liberal (Romanian: PRO România Social-Liberal).

During early 2021 however, ALDE seceded from PRO Romania due to internal frictions between Ponta and Popescu-Tăriceanu as well as due to poor results from both the local and legislative elections which were held throughout the previous year. As of March 2021, ALDE is solely active at local political level in Romania, where it has a very feeble amount of mayors, county councillors, and local council councillors. It has also been in extra-parliamentary opposition to the PNL-USR PLUS-UDMR/RMDSZ government between late 2020 and late 2021.

However, during early 2022, ALDE switched to an extra-parliamentary support for the current governing grand coalition which is the National Coalition for Romania (or CNR for short) and is currently negotiating a very probable near future merger with the PNL, but without their former president Călin Popescu-Tăriceanu, who is no longer even a member of the party. In March 2022, ALDE was officially absorbed by the PNL.

== Leadership ==
Also served as Prime Minister and Senate President.

| Nº | Name Born - Died | Portrait | Term start | Term end | Duration |
|---|---|---|---|---|---|
| 1 | Călin Popescu-Tăriceanu (1952– | | 19 June 2015 | April 2017 | 1 year, 9 months and 14 days |
| 1 | Daniel Constantin (1978– | | 19 June 2015 | April 2017 | 1 year, 9 months and 14 days |
| 2 | Călin Popescu-Tăriceanu (1952– | | April 2017 | 19 October 2020 | 3 years, 6 months and 17 days |
| 3 | Daniel Olteanu | | 19 October 2020 | 22 March 2022 | 1 year, 5 months and 3 days |

== Electoral history ==
=== Legislative elections ===
| Election | Chamber | | | Senate | | | Position | Aftermath |
| Election | Votes | % | Seats | Votes | % | Seats | Position | Aftermath |
|---|---|---|---|---|---|---|---|---|
| 2012 | did not exist^{1} | | 25 / 412 | did not exist | | 6 / 176 | — | PSD-UNPR-ALDE government (2014–2015) |
| 2012 | did not exist^{1} | | 25 / 412 | did not exist | | 6 / 176 | — | Opposition to the technocratic Cioloș Cabinet (2015–2017) |
| 2016 | 396,386 | 5.62 | 20 / 329 | 423,728 | 6.01 | 9 / 136 | 5th | PSD-ALDE government (2017–2019) |
| 2016 | 396,386 | 5.62 | 20 / 329 | 423,728 | 6.01 | 9 / 136 | 5th | Opposition to PSD minority government (2019) |
| 2016 | 396,386 | 5.62 | 20 / 329 | 423,728 | 6.01 | 9 / 136 | 5th | Supporting PNL minority government (2019–2020) |
| 2016 | 396,386 | 5.62 | 20 / 329 | 423,728 | 6.01 | 9 / 136 | 5th | Opposition to PNL minority government (2020) |
| 2020 | did not compete^{2} | | | | | | | Extra-parliamentary opposition to PNL-USR PLUS-UDMR government (2020–2021) |
| 2020 | did not compete^{2} | | | | | | | Extra-parliamentary opposition to PNL-UDMR minority government (2021) |
| 2020 | did not compete^{2} | | | | | | | Extra-parliamentary support to CNR government (2021–2022) |

Notes:
^{1} The MPs were previously elected on PC and PNL lists.
^{2} Members of ALDE ran on PRO Romania list.

=== Local elections ===
==== National results ====
| Election | County Councilors (CJ) | | | Mayors | | | Local Councilors (CL) | | | Popular vote | % | Position |
| Election | Votes | % | Seats | Votes | % | Seats | Votes | % | Seats | Popular vote | % | Position |
|---|---|---|---|---|---|---|---|---|---|---|---|---|
| 2016 | 411,823 | 4.98 | 95 / 1,434 | 315,236 | 3.69 | 195 / 3,186 | 390,321 | 4.66 | 2,284 / 40,067 | —N/a | —N/a | 3rd |
| 2020 | 209,411 | 2.91 | 15 / 1,340 | 124,649 | 1.67 | 15 / 3,176 | 189,665 | 2.58 | 861 / 39,900 | —N/a | —N/a | 7th |

==== Mayor of Bucharest ====
| Election | Candidate | First round | | |
| Election | Candidate | Votes | Percentage | Position |
|---|---|---|---|---|
| 2016 | Daniel Barbu | 17,455 | 3.04% | 5th |
| 2020 | Călin Popescu-Tăriceanu | 9,892 | 1.49% | 5th |

=== Presidential elections ===
| Election | Candidate | First round | | | Second round | | |
| Election | Candidate | Votes | Percentage | Position | Votes | Percentage | Position |
|---|---|---|---|---|---|---|---|
| 2019 | Mircea Diaconu^{1} | 815,201 | 8.85% | 4th | not qualified | | |

Notes:

^{1} Mircea Diaconu was the candidate of the "One Man" (Romanian: Un om) alliance; The alliance's members were PRO Romania and ALDE.

=== European elections ===
| Election | Votes | Percentage | MEPs | Position | EU Party | EP Group |
|---|---|---|---|---|---|---|
| 2019 | 372,760 | 4.11% | 0 / 32 | 7th | ALDE | — |
