= Dominic Fritz =

German-Romanian politician (born 1983)

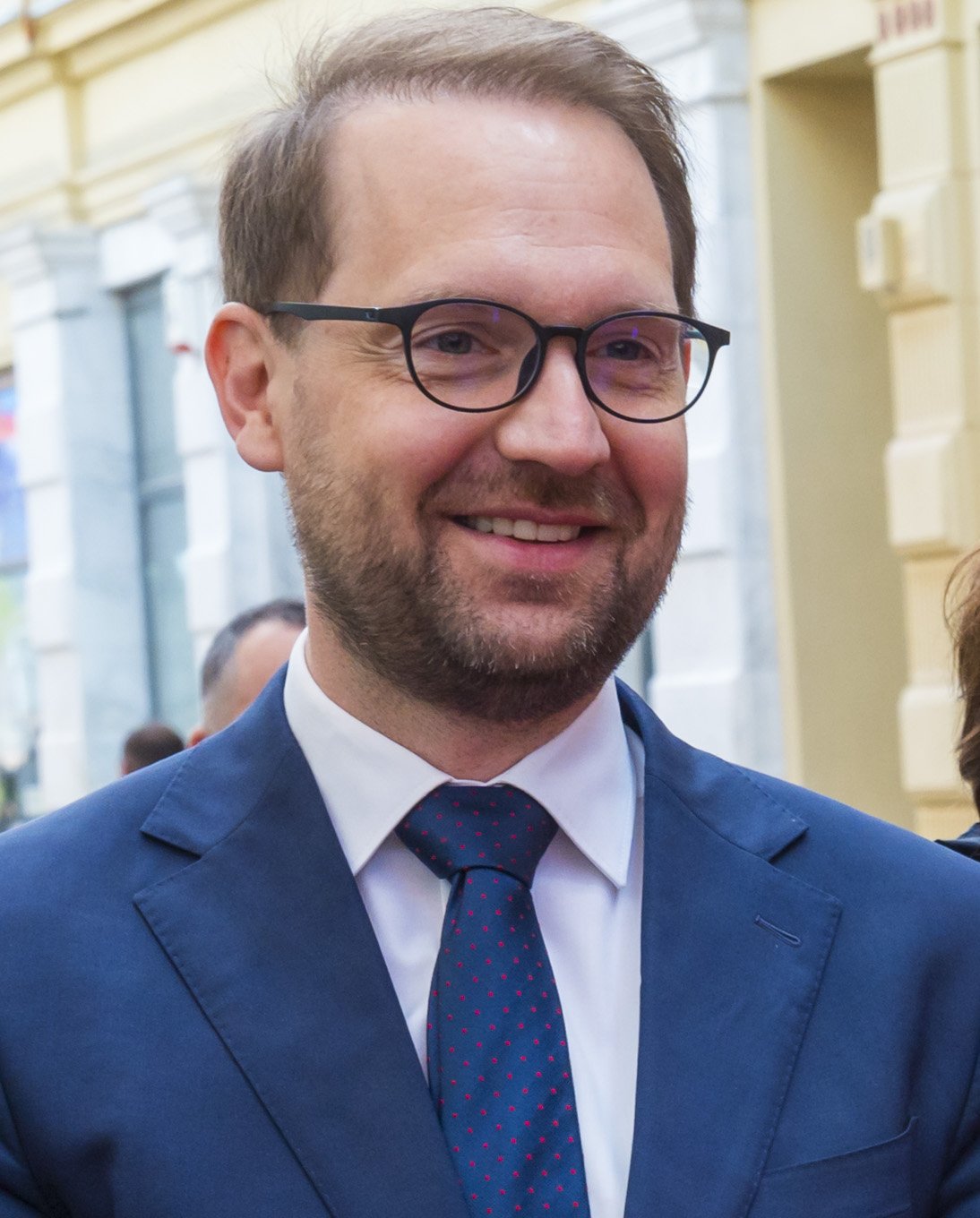
- Fritz in 2025

Mayor of Timișoara
- In office 30 October 2020 – 30 September 2026
- Deputy: Ruben Lațcău; Paula Romocean
- Preceded by: Nicolae Robu
- Succeeded by: Ruben Lațcău (acting)

President of the Save Romania Union
- Incumbent
- Assumed office 5 May 2025 (Note: Acting: 5 May – 13 June 2025)
- Preceded by: Elena Lasconi
- Acting; 10 June 2024 – 26 June 2024
- Preceded by: Cătălin Drulă
- Succeeded by: Elena Lasconi

Personal details
- Born: Dominic Samuel Fritz; 28 December 1983 (age 42) Lörrach, Baden-Württemberg, West Germany
- Citizenship: Germany; Romania (since 2025)
- Party: Save Romania Union (since 2019)
- Other political affiliations: Alliance 90/The Greens (2009–2019)
- Spouse: Yiran Lin (m. 2021)
- Children: 1
- Education: University of Konstanz; Sciences Po; University of York
- Website: www.dominicprimar.ro/en

Dominic Samuel Fritz (born 28 December 1983) is a German-Romanian politician who served as mayor of Timișoara from 2020 to 2026, winning re-election in 2024. A member of the Save Romania Union, he was the only mayor in Romania without Romanian citizenship until December 2025, when he became a Romanian citizen.

Prior to becoming the mayor of Timișoara in 2020, Fritz was a member of Alliance 90/The Greens between 2009 and 2019 and also a political advisor to former President of Germany Horst Köhler between 2016 and 2019. Fritz is a political scientist by profession.

On 13 June 2025, he was elected president of the Save Romania Union in the first round, with 67.2% of the vote.

== Early life and education ==
Fritz was born on 28 December 1983 in Lörrach, Baden-Württemberg, West Germany. His parents were both teachers. Fritz grew up as the third child of a total of eight siblings in Görwihl in the Southern Black Forest. In 1999, at the age of 16, a scholarship from the Bundestag enabled him to spend a year in the United States. He passed his Abitur at the Jesuit Kolleg St. Blasien in 2003. In the same year, Fritz came to Timișoara for the first time as part of a voluntary social year with the Jesuit European Volunteers, where he worked in a children's hospice in the Freidorf district run by Salvatorian priest and humanitarian Berno Rupp, which takes care of orphans and street children in the city. From then on, he will visit Timișoara several times a year, finally buying an apartment in the Iosefin district in 2015.

Between 2004 and 2008 he studied political and administrative sciences at the University of Konstanz with a scholarship from the German Academic Scholarship Foundation. His bachelor thesis addressed social policies in Romania. Later, in 2009, he obtained a master's degree in post-conflict studies at the University of York. In 2006, he did a seven-month internship at the Pentru Voi Foundation, where he established the first mentoring program for adults with intellectual disabilities in Romania.

== Political career ==
From 2009 to 2019 Fritz was a member of Alliance 90/The Greens, in whose Frankfurt district association he was elected as an assessor in 2011. Here he helped organize the campaign for local elections. From 2009 to 2012 he also worked as a consultant for the German Agency for International Cooperation (GIZ) on international development projects and peacekeeping missions in Africa. After that, from 2016 to 2019, he was an advisor and chief of staff of former German president Horst Köhler.

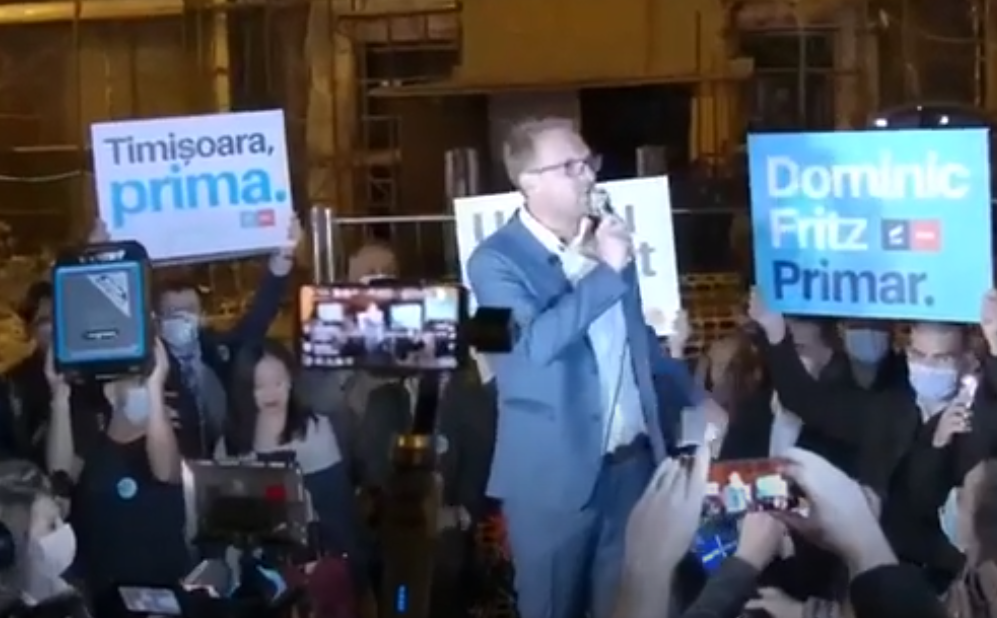
Fritz on the evening of winning the election in Timișoara's Victory Square

Amid the countrywide anti-corruption protests in the winter of 2017, he joined the liberal party Save Romania Union (USR), which nominated him as a candidate for the upcoming local election, for which he moved from Berlin to Timișoara in 2019. His candidature was also supported by the local branch of the Democratic Forum of Germans in Romania (FDGR/DFDR). In the 27 September 2020 election, Fritz won with 53.25% of the votes against incumbent Nicolae Robu, the National Liberal Party (PNL) candidate, who had sought a third term in office. Robu, former rector of the Politehnica University of Timișoara, had previously refused an electoral debate with Fritz and in a nationalist campaign called him a "foreign adventurer" who regarded Romania as a cow to be milked. His investiture was delayed by appeals filed in court by PNL sympathizers, since Fritz does not have Romanian citizenship. However, according to Law no. 115 of 2015, EU citizens have the right to be elected as mayor, local councilor, county councilor, and president of the county council anywhere in Romania, provided they have their official residence in that area. The appeals were ultimately rejected, and Fritz took the oath in the Capitol Hall of the Banatul Philharmonic on 30 October 2020.

=== As mayor of Timișoara ===
During his mandates, Fritz led the city through record investments in public schools and urban mobility and transformed Timișoara City Hall into the most digitally advanced local administration in Romania.

Under his leadership, the municipality attracted €500 million in European funds and launched ambitious urban regeneration projects.

Following the 2022 Russian invasion of Ukraine and the subsequent refugee crisis, he helped establish coalition of support Timișoara for Ukraine, an initiative that brought NGOs, religious communities, local entrepreneurs and citizens together to support Ukrainian citizens and local authorities, especially from the sister city of Chernivtsi. Its main objectives are buying vital equipment for Ukraine and developing a complex system for receiving, supporting and integrating refugees arriving in Timișoara.

Being a vocal campaigner for a less car-centric urban mobility, he has attracted European funding from the Recovery and Resilience Plan for Romania (PNRR) in order to renew the city's public transport fleet. The amount of 308 million lei will be used to buy 30 electric buses, eight trolleybuses and 17 trams. PNRR is a plan approved in 2021 for Romania's economic recovery package ensuing COVID-19 pandemic, and is part of Next Generation EU economic recovery package.

In 2021, the local branch of USR elected Fritz as its president, who ran unopposed.

On 17 January 2022, members of the right wing party Alianța pentru Unirea Românilor (Alliance for the Union of Romanians), along with individuals from the far-right group Noua Dreaptă (New Right), stormed Timișoara's city hall, chanting slogans against the mayor. The incident provoked widespread outrage across Romania. In response, the mayors of 23 Romanian cities signed a declaration of solidarity with Fritz and urged the state to adopt a firmer stance against such acts of aggression.

=== As president of the Save Romania Union ===
At the beginning of the campaign for the 2025 Romanian presidential election, Dominic Fritz was among the USR leaders (alongside Ionuț Moșteanu) who, after an internal poll conducted in April showed that Save Romania Union president Elena Lasconi had only 4.1% of voter support, publicly called on her to withdraw from the presidential race in favor of Nicușor Dan. The two argued that such a decision would strengthen Save Romania Union's chances according to the polls and mobilize the electorate against the major political parties. However, Lasconi rejected the request, denouncing the internal pressure as a "game of the system." Ultimately, at Fritz's proposal, the Save Romania Union's National Bureau decided that the party would officially support the independent candidacy of Nicușor Dan, who would go on to become the President of Romania.

On 5 May 2025, Dominic Fritz was appointed interim president of the USR, following the resignation of Elena Lasconi from the position, an interim that lasted until 13 June 2025. On the same day, he was elected president of the party in the first round with 67.2% of the votes.

== Controversies ==
In 2026, PSD and AUR introduced a provision that would automatically remove elected officials from office following a final conflict-of-interest finding, including findings issued before the provision came into force. The amendment, widely referred to in Romania as the “Fritz amendment”, directly targets Dominic Fritz and lead to the termination of his mandate as Mayor of Timișoara.

The provision was introduced as part of an unrelated integrity-law reform linked to Romania’s EU Recovery and Resilience Plan. On 17 August 2026, the Constitutional Court upheld the amendment, despite concerns that its retroactive application conflicts with the principle of non-retroactivity under Article 15(2) of the Romanian Constitution.

The underlying National Integrity Agency (ANI) finding dates back to 2020, when Fritz signed a technical document in a zoning procedure initiated under his predecessor, which determined political observers to consider accusations fabricated. ANI classified the act as an administrative conflict of interest. Fritz was sanctioned and the sanction was enforced. Under current legislation, the conduct in question is no longer subject to sanction.

Save Romania Union convened to back Dominic Fritz as Chairman of the party after this ruling.

== Electoral history ==
=== Mayor of Timișoara ===
| Election | Affiliation | Main round | | |
| Election | Affiliation | Votes | Percentage | Position |
|---|---|---|---|---|
| 2020 | USR PLUS | 49,191 | 53.25% | 1st |
| 2024 | ADU | 53,070 | 49.7% | 1st |

== Personal life ==
Fritz, who plays piano and cello, has performed with various orchestras and chamber ensembles. He also sang in semi-professional choirs, conducted several ensembles, composed choral music and published two CDs with his own compositions in Germany. In 2004, he created the Timișoara Gospel Project, initially a gospel choir made up of institutionalized children which over time grew in size and would hold concerts with the Banatul Philharmonic for charitable causes. Since 2012 he has been president of the TGP Cultural Association. For his commitment to culture, he was awarded the city's diploma of excellence in 2014 at Timișoara City Hall.

Since 2021, Fritz has been married to Yiran Lin, a Chinese-born former UN diplomat. Fritz and Lin live in a house in the Elisabetin district of Timișoara. They have a daughter together, Maya Luming.

In addition to his mother tongue, German, Fritz is fluent in Romanian, English, and French. In 2024, he applied for Romanian citizenship. He became a Romanian citizen on 18 December 2025.

Fritz is a practicing Roman Catholic.
