= Force of the Right =

Force of the Right Forța Dreptei
- Abbreviation: FD
- President: Ludovic Orban
- Spokesman: Ionel Dancă
- Founded: 14 December, 2021
- Split from: National Liberal Party (PNL)
- Merged into: National Liberal Party (PNL) (expected)
- Membership: c. 20,000
- Ideology: Liberal conservatism Christian democracy Pro-Europeanism
- Political position: Centre-right to right-wing
- National affiliation: United Right Alliance (2023–2024); Alliance of Liberal-Conservative Right Forces (since September, 2024)
- European affiliation: Non-affiliated; European People's Party (EPP), intention
- Colours: Green
- Slogan: Prin noi înșine! ("Through Ourselves!")
- Senate: 0 / 136
- Chamber of Deputies: 0 / 330
- County councilors: 17 / 1,338

Website
- forta-dreptei.ro

Force of the Right (Romanian: Forța Dreptei, FD), sometimes translated as Right's Force or Right Force, is an extra-parliamentary liberal-conservative political party in Romania founded in December, 2021 by Ludovic Orban, former National Liberal Party (PNL) president and former prime minister of Romania between 2019 and 2020, in opposition to the former leadership of the PNL under by Florin Cîțu which lasted from September, 2021 to April, 2022.

The party is expected to merge back into PNL after the latter's 2026 consolidation of the Bolojan leadership, with Orban saying: "Let us, the liberals from Forța Dreptei, return home, through the front door, and let us also lend our shoulder, in our good faith, with our limited powers, so that together with you we can show that PNL is the party that can take Romania to where each and every Romanian can want it".

== History ==
On 3 October 2021, former Romanian prime minister Ludovic Orban, who had been previously defeated for the leadership of the National Liberal Party (PNL) by Florin Cîțu at the PNL congress held in September 2021 at Romexpo in Bucharest, stated that he is willing "to create a new political construction which would be ready to continue PNL's legacy". In this regard, Orban was walking in the steps of another former PNL Prime Minister, more specifically Călin Popescu-Tăriceanu, who left the PNL earlier in 2015 (also in opposition to Iohannis) in order to establish the Alliance of Liberals and Democrats (ALDE).

Furthermore, commentators claimed Orban's faction was going to part ways with the PNL should he not be designated PM after Florin Cîțu's dismissal by the Parliament, which also happened in the meantime along with the nominations of former PM Dacian Cioloș of Save Romania Union (USR) and Nicolae Ciucă of PNL proper (the latter serving as acting PM between Orban's and Cîțu's premierships/terms).

By 2 November 2021, Orban together with 14 other parliamentarians left the PNL parliamentary group. In response, the current leadership of the PNL announced its intention to exclude from the party everyone taking this move, emphasizing that "the door of PNL is closed to those who make fun of PNL". On 12 November 2021, the current leadership of the PNL expelled Orban at the proposal of Dan Vîlceanu, a supporter of Florin Cîțu. By 23 November 2021, the pro-Orban parliamentarians who left the PNL parliamentary group left the party itself as well, being followed in this move by the entirety of the National Liberal Youth (the PNL's youth wing)'s Sector 3 branch on 27 November 2021. Orban said that he rejects all neo-Marxist-progressive currents, and that the new party will be liberal conservative.

Originally, the party was going to be named the Liberal Force (Romanian: Forța Liberală, FL). On 14 December 2021, Orban submitted the documents necessary in order to establish the new party, which was then going to be named after the name of his motion used to run for a second term as PNL president at the September 2021 PNL congress, more specifically the Right's Force/Force of the Right, that will be "valid until the [first] congress of the party". Orban said the Force of the Right is a pro-European party, which is not anti-establishment, and which wants to join the European People's Party (EPP). In February 2022, the parliamentary group of right-wing deputies was established to represent FD in the Chamber of Deputies, with Violeta Alexandru as its leader.

On 14 December 2023, Save Romania Union (USR), Force of the Right (FD) and the People's Movement Party (PMP) officially announced the creation of a right-wing electoral alliance to contest in the 2024 elections. On 18 December, the alliance was formally named as United Right Alliance (ADU).

== Leadership ==
Also served as minister of transport between 2007 and 2008 in the Second Tăriceanu cabinet, prime minister between 2019 and 2020, and President of the Chamber of Deputies of Romania between 2020 and 2021 (as well as president of the National Liberal Party between 2017 and 2021)

Nº	Name Born - Died	Portrait	Term start	Term end	Duration
1	Ludovic Orban (1963–)		December, 2021	present	Incumbent

== Electoral history ==
=== Legislative elections ===
Election	Chamber			Senate			Position	Aftermath
Election	Votes	%	Seats	Votes	%	Seats	Position	Aftermath
2020	did not exist (Note: The MPs were elected on PNL's electoral list (3 additional ones who subsequently joined the group through party switching in the Chamber of Deputies were initially elected on AUR's list). Initially, there were 14 MPs representing the FD in the Chamber of Deputies but one left their parliamentary group before the arrival of the aforementioned 3 party switchers from AUR.)		16 / 330	did not exist		3 / 136	—	PNL-USR PLUS-UDMR government (2020–2021)
2020	did not exist		16 / 330	did not exist		3 / 136	—	Opposition to PNL-UDMR minority government (2021)
2020	did not exist		16 / 330	did not exist		3 / 136	—	Opposition to CNR government (2021–2024)
2024 (Note: Competed as the electoral alliance Alianța Forțelor de Dreapta Liberal-Conservatoare (AFDLC) alongside the People's Movement Party (PMP), The Right Alternative (AD), and the National Peasants' Party Maniu-Mihalache (PNȚMM).)	189,900	2.05	0 / 331	173,703	1.88	0 / 136	9th	Extra-parliamentary

=== Presidential elections ===
Election	Candidate	First round			Second round		
Election	Candidate	Votes	Percentage	Position	Votes	Percentage	Position
2024	Ludovic Orban (Note: Orban dropped out of the 2024 race and endorsed Lasconi, but remained on the ballot as the FD candidate)	20,089	0.22%	11th	not qualified		
2024	Elena Lasconi	1,772,500	19.18%	2nd	election annulled		
2025	Endorsed Nicușor Dan	1,979,767	20.99%	2nd	6,168,696	53.60%	1st

=== European elections ===
Election	Votes	%	MEPs	Position	EU Party
2024	778,901	8.71	0 / 33	3rd (Note: ADU members: USR (2 MEPs), PMP (1 MEP) and FD (no mandates).)	EPP

== See also ==
- List of political parties in Romania
