= Diana Stoica =

Romanian politician (born 1991)

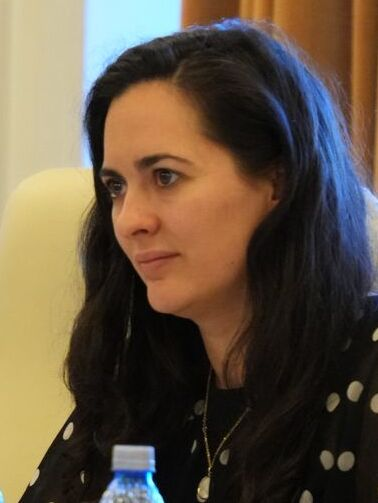

Member of the Chamber of Deputies
- Incumbent
- Assumed office 21 December 2020
- Constituency: Bucharest

Personal details
- Born: 23 February 1991 (age 35)
- Party: USR (since 2021); PLUS (until 2021)

Diana Stoica (born 23 February 1991) is a Romanian politician of the Save Romania Union. Since 2020, she has been a member of the Chamber of Deputies. She previously worked as advisor to health minister Vlad Voiculescu during the government of Dacian Cioloș.
