= Cristian Ghinea =

Romanian politician (born 1977)

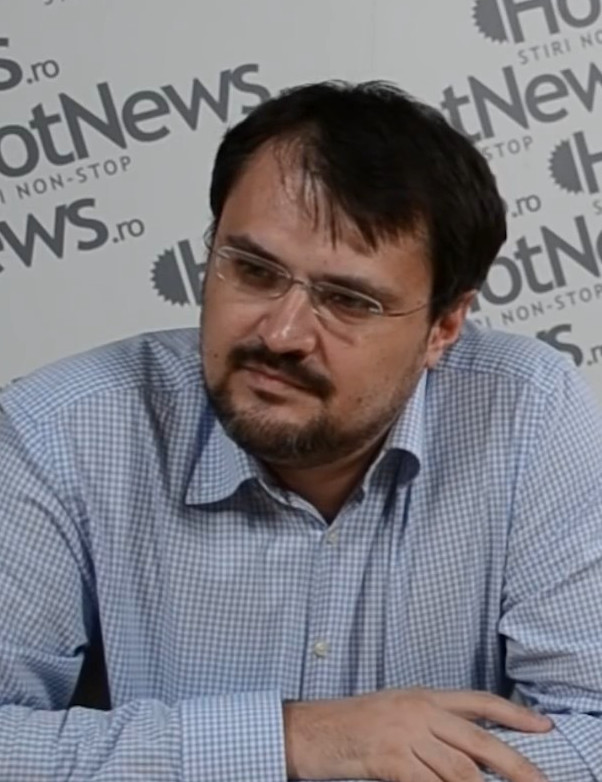

Member of the European Parliament for Romania
- In office 2 July 2019 – 22 December 2020
- Succeeded by: Alin Mituța

Minister of European Funds
- In office 23 December 2020 – 6 September 2021
- Prime Minister: Florin Cîțu
- Preceded by: Ioan-Marcel Boloș
- Succeeded by: Florin Cîțu
- In office 27 April 2016 – 29 October 2016
- Prime Minister: Dacian Cioloș
- Preceded by: Aura Carmen Răducu
- Succeeded by: Dragoș-Cristian Dinu

Member of the Chamber of Deputies
- In office 21 December 2016 – 1 July 2019
- Constituency: Bucharest

Personal details
- Born: 20 July 1977 (age 49) Bucharest, Romania
- Party: Save Romania Union (USR)
- Education: National University of Political Studies and Public Administration; London School of Economics
- Profession: Journalist; Social activist
- Website: www.cristianghinea.ro

Cristian Ghinea (born 1977) is a Romanian publisher and activist who has been serving as a Minister of Investments and European Projects in the cabinet of Prime Minister Florin Cîțu since 2021.

== Political career ==
Born in Bucharest, he studied at the National University of Political Studies and Public Administration and then obtained an M.A. in political science from the London School of Economics. Before entering politics, Ghinea was founder and director of organization CRPE. In November 2015 he was appointed councillor for European business in the Cioloș Cabinet.

Ghinea was elected to the Chamber of Deputies in the 2016 Romanian legislative election. From 27 April to 26 October 2016 he served as Minister of European Funds in the Romanian government of technocrats, under Prime Minister Dacian Cioloș. Since October 2017, he has been the vice president of the party Save Romania Union.

From 2019 until 2020, Ghinea was a Member of the European Parliament. In parliament, he served on the Committee on Regional Development.
