= United Right Alliance =

United Right Alliance Alianța Dreapta Unită
- Abbreviation: ADU
- Leader: Elena Lasconi (USR); Ludovic Orban (FD); Eugen Tomac (PMP)
- Founded: 18 December 2023
- Dissolved: 6 September 2024
- Political position: Majority: Centre-right; Minority: Right-wing
- European affiliation: ALDE Party (USR); EPP (FD and PMP)
- European Parliament group: Renew (USR and PMP)
- Alliance parties: Save Romania Union (USR); Force of the Right (FD); People's Movement Party (PMP)

Website
- dreaptaunita.eu
- Politics of Romania; Political parties; Elections; A: The largest party in the coalition, the Save Romania Union (USR), is a broadly centre to centre-right and liberal party, while the smaller parties of the Force of the Right (FD) and the People's Movement Party (PMP), lean right ideologically (see table below).

United Right Alliance (Romanian: Alianța Dreapta Unită, ADU) was a centre-right electoral alliance that was formed to compete in the 2024 Romanian parliamentary election. It opposed the former National Coalition for Romania (CNR) government.

== History ==
On 14 December 2023, Save Romania Union, Force of the Right and the People's Movement Party officially announced the creation of a right-leaning opposition electoral alliance to contest in the 2024 elections. On 18 December, the alliance was formally named as United Right Alliance.

In 2024, the Alliance concentrated their efforts mostly in supporting independent candidate and incumbent Mayor of Bucharest, Nicușor Dan. They have been criticized for not being more active in the rest of the country and for not being more involved in promoting the Alliance for the European Parliament elections. Former USR president and the unofficial leader of the Alliance, Cătălin Drulă, was also criticized and accused of trying to further his own image for the upcoming 2024 presidential elections, putting up campaign banners all over the country featuring only his face, even though he was not running for any of the positions in the local elections, nor those for the European Parliament. It is widely considered in the Romanian public that incumbent mayors for Sector 1 and Sector 2 in Bucharest were disadvantaged because of this, as they have declared they also received next to no funding for their campaigns from the Alliance. This resulted in very tight races for both of the sectors; the results are still being disputed, as Sector 1 mayor Clotilde Armand and Sector 2 mayor Radu Mihaiu have both accused the governing CNR of orchestrating electoral fraud in their respective districts.

As of late June 2024, the Alliance is expected to be dissolved, following declarations from the new USR president, Elena Lasconi, who replaced former leader Drulă, who quit following weak results in both the local and European Parliament elections.

== Priorities and principles ==
Here are the 12 priorities of the United Right "to complete European integration and modernization of Romania":

1. Get Romania truly in Schengen
2. A European life for Romanians (economic stability through the transition to the Euro, prosperity through industrialisation, trade and innovation)
3. State reform and anti-corruption (defend the Union against illiberal slippages right at home)
4. Democracy, fundamental rights and rule of law
5. Health & education for Romanians at European standards
6. EU funds for Romania's modernisation (spent more efficiently and with greater impact)
7. Agriculture and rural middle class (bring funding for family farms to European level)
8. Union with Moldova in the European Union
9. Romania's contribution to EU reform
10. Defend the rights of Romanian workers in Europe to decent income and pensions
11. A prosperous Europe with a clean environment
12. European armies, better integrated into NATO and better prepared (respond together to challenges. We support Ukraine, we defend ourselves)

== Composition ==
The table below lists the parties in the alliance. The alliance currently holds a total of 23 seats in the 163 seat Senate of Romania, 57 seats in the 330 seat Chamber of Deputies, and 10 seats out of the 33 Romanian seats of the European Parliament.

=== Parliament of Romania ===
The vote percentage comes from the parties which contested the 2020 Romanian parliamentary election.

| Abbr. | Name | Main ideology | Political position | Leader | Senate | Chamber of Deputies | Vote % in the 2020 election |
|---|---|---|---|---|---|---|---|
| USR | Save Romania Union; Uniunea Salvați România | Liberalism | Centre to centre-right | Dominic Fritz | 20 / 136 | 41 / 330 | 15.86% (Note: Was part of the USR PLUS alliance.) |
| FD | Force of the Right; Forța Dreptei | Liberal conservatism | Centre-right to right-wing | Ludovic Orban | 3 / 136 | 16 / 330 | N/A |
| PMP | People's Movement Party; Partidul Mișcarea Populară | National conservatism | Centre-right to right-wing | Eugen Tomac | 0 / 136 | 0 / 330 | 4.93% |

=== European Parliament ===
The vote percentage comes from the parties which contested the 2019 European Parliament election in Romania.

| Abbr. | Name | Main ideology | Political position | Leader | Seats | EP party | EP group | Vote % in the 2019 election |
|---|---|---|---|---|---|---|---|---|
| USR | Save Romania Union; Uniunea Salvați România | Liberalism | Centre to centre-right | Dominic Fritz | 1 / 33 | ALDE | Renew | 22.36% |
| FD | Force of the Right; Forța Dreptei | Liberal conservatism | Centre-right to right-wing | Ludovic Orban | 0 / 33 | EPP (intention) | EPP (intention) | N/A |
| PMP | People's Movement Party; Partidul Mișcarea Populară | National conservatism | Centre-right to right-wing | Eugen Tomac | 2 / 33 | EPP | EPP | 5.76% |

== Candidates for the 2024 European Parliament election ==
=== The Alliance's candidates for the 2024 European Parliament election ===
1. Dan Barna
2. Vlad Voiculescu
3. Eugen Tomac
4. Vlad Botoș
5. Cristina Prună
6. Violeta Alexandru
7. Radu Mihail
8. Corina Atanasiu
9. Adriana Cristian
10. George Gima
11. Teodora Stoian
12. Ramona Goga
13. Alina Gîrbea
14. Geta Daniela Drăghici
15. Alina Totti
16. Nicolae Mihai Șvab
17. Emilia Mateescu
18. Ion Belu
19. Gabriela Ferguson
20. Lucia Hang
21. Dan Adrian Pop
22. Lucian Judele
23. Raluca Bercea
24. Ciprian Alexandru
25. Andrei Chirica
26. Răzvan Socolov
27. Adrian Giurgiu
28. Sergiu Grui
29. Daniela Șarpe
30. Aurel Fierăscu
31. Alina Bălășcău
32. Alex Cozma
33. Silviu Andrei
34. Maria Udrescu
35. Mihai Zvîncă
36. Laurențiu Gheorghe
37. Liana Ursa
38. Florin Drăgulin
39. Ion-Marian Lazăr
40. Robert Voicu
41. Alexandru German
42. Irena Pleșoiu
43. Eusebiu Iftode
44. Ioan Bledea

== Electoral history ==
=== European elections ===
| Election | Votes | % | MEPs | Position | EU Party | EP Group |
|---|---|---|---|---|---|---|
| 2024 | 778,901 | 8.71 | 3 / 33 | 3rd ^{1} | ALDE/EPP | RE/EPP Group |

Note:
^{1} United Right Alliance members: USR (2 MEPs), PMP (1 MEP) and FD (no mandates).
