= Elena Lasconi =

Romanian politician (born 1972)

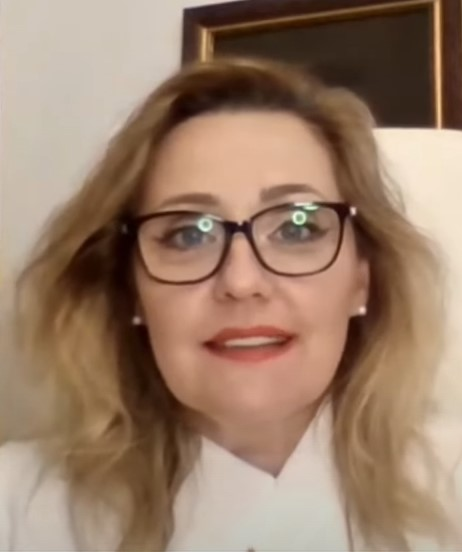
- Lasconi in 2024

President of the Save Romania Union
- In office 26 June 2024 – 5 May 2025
- Preceded by: Cătălin Drulă
- Succeeded by: Dominic Fritz (acting)

Mayor of Câmpulung
- Incumbent
- Assumed office 19 October 2020
- Preceded by: Liviu Țâroiu

Personal details
- Born: Elena Valerica Lasconi; 20 April 1972 (age 54) Hațeg, Hunedoara County, Socialist Republic of Romania
- Party: Save Romania Union (since 2019)
- Spouse: Cătălin Georgescu (m. 2012)
- Children: 1
- Education: Traian Ecological University of Deva (BA awarded by Bucharest Academy of Economic Studies)
- Profession: Politician; journalist; media personality
- Website: elenalasconi.ro

Elena Valerica Lasconi (Romanian: [eˈlena lasˈkoni]; born 20 April 1972) is a Romanian politician and former journalist. She is serving as the mayor of Câmpulung in Argeș County, having been elected in both the 2020 and 2024 elections. On 26 June 2024, she won the internal elections in the Save Romania Union (USR), becoming its president. USR elected her in a landslide as the party's candidate in the 2024 presidential election.

Lasconi briefly led the list of USR candidates for the 2024 European Parliament elections, a position she resigned from at the request of the former party president, Cătălin Drulă. Lasconi placed second in the first round of the 2024 Romanian presidential election on 24 November 2024. She would have faced the independent Călin Georgescu in a runoff on 8 December 2024 had the first round not been annulled by the Constitutional Court.

== Early life and education ==
Elena Lasconi was born on 20 April 1972 in Hațeg, Hunedoara County. She completed her high school education at Queen Marie National Pedagogical College in Deva in 1990. She pursued higher education at the Traian Ecological University of Deva, finishing it in 2001, when she received her Bachelor's degree after an exam at the Bucharest Academy of Economic Studies. Additionally, she attended the BBC School of Television in 1999 and became an evaluator of professional competencies in 2007, certified by the National Center for the Training and Improvement of Coaches (CNFPA). From 2019 to 2020, she undertook courses on European Structural and Investment Funds absorption, legislation, and regulations both in Romania and Brussels under the Renew Europe – O Țară ca Afară program.

== Journalism career ==
Lasconi had a career in journalism spanning over two decades. From 1996 to March 2020, she worked at Pro TV, where she held various roles including reporter, TV producer, war correspondent, news presenter, and trainer. Her notable assignments included covering major national and international events such as the January 1999 Mineriad, the Kosovo and Afghanistan wars, the 1999 Turkey earthquake, and Romanian presidential and parliamentary elections. She contributed to the România, te iubesc! show and several media campaigns addressing social issues such as domestic violence, child trafficking, and rural education.

Before joining Pro TV, Lasconi worked as a program director and show host at Radio T5 ABC in Hațeg, her hometown, from 1995 to 1996. She was involved in obtaining the broadcasting license from the National Audiovisual Council, as well as in creating and managing the station's programming and events.

== Political career ==
=== Mayor of Câmpulung ===
Lasconi was first elected as mayor of Câmpulung in 2020, defeating incumbent mayor Liviu Țâroiu from the Social Democratic Party (PSD). She was re-elected in a landslide in 2024.

Her office claimed that during her tenure, the town reportedly secured over 500 million lei in European Structural and Investment Funds, expanded the gas network by over 30 kilometers, and enhanced local healthcare facilities. The total value of European funds has however been disputed by the fact checking site Factual.ro, which noted that between November 2020 and October 2024, the town had implemented or was implementing projects with a total European funding of 302 million lei. Her office further claimed that over 100,000 square meters of green spaces, basketball courts, multifunctional spaces, calisthenics parks, ice rinks, playgrounds, and fitness equipment for adults have been developed with Lasconi as mayor. She also promoted Câmpulung as a national tourist destination and fostered relationships with international and national organizations.

=== President of the Save Romania Union ===
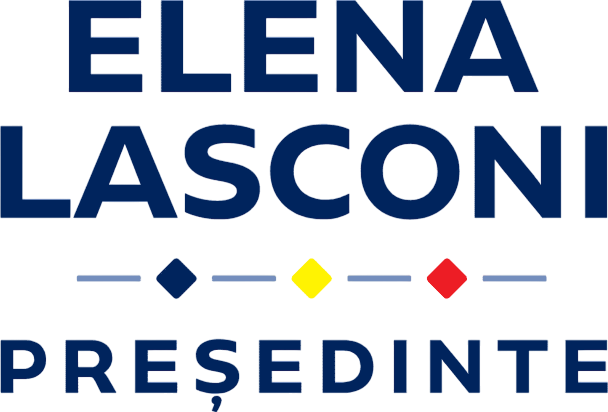
Logo of the Elena Lasconi presidential campaign, 2024

The disappointing results obtained by the United Right Alliance (ADU), of which USR was a senior party, prompted president Cătălin Drulă to resign and call for an internal vote on a new president on 26 June 2024. Lasconi submitted her candidacy on the last day before the deadline. Dominic Fritz, mayor of Timișoara and former favorite in the race, withdrew his candidacy, paving way for Lasconi to become the new favorite. She was elected president with 7,701 votes (68.14%) out of 11,333 cast by the 25,607 eligible voting members. In her acceptance speech, Lasconi emphasized the need for unity and determination within the party, highlighting the importance of rebuilding USR to counteract the current political climate in Romania. She criticized the concentration of power among traditional parties and committed to fostering respect, hard work, and efficiency, drawing on her successful tenure as mayor.

=== 2024 and 2025 presidential candidate ===
Subsequently, on 29 June, she was designated the party's candidate in the November presidential election, receiving 94.31% of the votes in the congress. In the first round of voting on 24 November, she placed second to Călin Georgescu with 19.18% of the vote and advanced to the runoff scheduled for 8 December. However, the results of the election were annulled by the Constitutional Court on 6 December.

She ran again in the 2025 rerun election. She was due to be sued by two other candidates, Victor Ponta and Nicușor Dan, for posting photographs falsely linking them to former Romanian Intelligence Service deputy director Florian Coldea.

Lasconi got significantly less votes than in the 2024 elections, scoring only 2.68% of the vote. Subsequently, the next day after the elections, she announced she will step down as president of the Save Romania Union.

== Electoral history ==
=== Mayor of Câmpulung ===
Election	Affiliation	Main round		
Election	Affiliation	Votes	Percentage	Position
2020	USR PLUS	7,484	56.76%	1st
2024	ADU	9,203	69.58%	1st

=== Presidential elections ===
Election	Affiliation	First round			Second round		
Election	Affiliation	Votes	Percentage	Position	Votes	Percentage	Position
2024	USR	1,772,500	19.18%	2nd	election annulled		
2025	USR¹	252,721	2.68%	5th	not qualified		

¹USR subsequently withdrew, to a large extent, its political support for Lasconi during the campaign in favor of Nicușor Dan (although several local branches of the party still campaigned for Lasconi during the first round) even though she remained on the ballot as the official USR candidate.

== Personal life ==
Elena Lasconi married for the first time at the age of 18. The marriage lasted four years and resulted in a daughter, Oana, whom she raised alone after the divorce. She remarried at the age of 40, in 2012, with Cătălin Georgescu, whom she met at English language courses organized by the British Council; the couple has no children together.
