= Save Romania Union =

Save Romania Union Uniunea Salvați România
- Abbreviation: USR
- Leader: Dominic Fritz
- Leader in the Senate: Sorin-Gheorghe Șipoș
- Leader in the Chamber of Deputies: Diana Stoica
- Founder: Nicușor Dan
- Founded: 21 August 2016; 10 years ago
- Preceded by: Save Bucharest Union
- Headquarters: Blvd. Aviatorilor 9, Bucharest
- Youth wing: USR Youth
- Membership (2025): 19,095
- Ideology: Liberalism (Romanian); Pro-Europeanism; Anti-corruption
- Political position: Centre-right
- National affiliation: USR PLUS (2019–2021); United Right Alliance (2023–2024)
- European affiliation: Alliance of Liberals and Democrats for Europe
- European Parliament group: Renew Europe
- Colours: Blue; Red
- Senate: 18 / 135
- Chamber of Deputies: 40 / 330
- European Parliament: 2 / 33
- Mayors: 46 / 3,176
- County Councilors: 62 / 1,340
- Local Councilors: 1,207 / 39,900
- Ministers: 0 / 18

Website
- usr.ro

The Save Romania Union (Romanian: Uniunea Salvați România, USR) is a liberal political party in Romania. Founded on 21 August 2016, it emerged as the national continuation of the Save Bucharest Union (USB), a civic movement led by Nicușor Dan. The party advocates for anti-corruption reform, transparency in public administration, European integration, and modernization of state institutions.

USR is, as of 2026, the fourth-largest party in the Parliament of Romania, holding 40 seats in the Chamber of Deputies and 19 in the Senate.

Following the 2024 legislative election, USR joined the coalition government led by Ilie Bolojan (PNL) on 23 June 2025, contributing four ministers to a 16-member cabinet.

The current president of the party is Dominic Fritz, the ex-mayor of Timișoara, elected on 13 June 2025 with 67.2% of internal party votes and validated by the USR Congress on 21 June 2025.

== History ==
Initial logo of the USR

=== Save Bucharest Union and foundation (2015–2017) ===
USR's organizational roots trace to the Save Bucharest Union (USB), a civic political movement founded on 1 July 2015 in Bucharest by mathematician and civic activist Nicușor Dan. The movement originated in the Save Bucharest Association (Asociația Salvați Bucureștiul), a non-governmental organization established in 2006 to protect Bucharest's historic urban heritage from destructive real estate development.

At the 5 June 2016 local elections, USB obtained approximately 25% in Bucharest, placing it second behind the Social Democratic Party's candidate Gabriela Firea. USB also entered the Bucharest General Council and several sector councils with substantial representation. This electoral success served as the foundation for the national-level project.

At the 11 December 2016 legislative election, USR obtained 8.87% in the Chamber of Deputies and 8.92% in the Senate, becoming the third-largest political force in the Romanian Parliament, with 30 deputies and 13 senators. The party campaigned on an anti-corruption platform and opposed the modifications to the justice laws proposed by the PSD-ALDE coalition government during the 2017–2019 Romanian protests.

=== Barna presidency (2017–2021) ===
On 28 October 2017, at the Poiana Brașov congress, Dan Barna was elected the second president of the party. Under his leadership, USR pursued the "No Convicts in Public Office" (Fără Penali în Funcții Publice) civic campaign, which aimed to amend Article 37 of the Romanian Constitution to bar persons with final imprisonment convictions from holding elected office. More than 1 million signatures from eligible voters were collected.

In February 2019, USR and the Freedom, Unity and Solidarity Party (PLUS), led by former Prime Minister Dacian Cioloș, formed the USR PLUS Alliance to contest the 2019 European Parliament election. The alliance obtained 22.36% (4 USR + 4 PLUS MEPs), finishing third.

At the 2020 legislative election (held within the USR PLUS Alliance), USR obtained 15.37% in the Chamber and 15.86% in the Senate. USR PLUS joined the PNL–USR PLUS–UDMR coalition government led by Florin Cîțu and held several key ministries until the coalition collapsed in September 2021.

=== USR–PLUS merger and Cioloș presidency (2021–2022) ===
On 15 August 2020, an online congress of USR and PLUS members approved the formal merger of the two parties with 84.65% support. The legal merger was finalized on 16 April 2021 following approval by the Bucharest Court of Appeal.

At the October 2021 congress, Dacian Cioloș was elected president of the merged party, which subsequently dropped the "USR PLUS" designation and returned to using the name "Save Romania Union" (USR).

On 11 October 2021, Cioloș was nominated by President Klaus Iohannis to form a new government following the collapse of the Cîțu cabinet, but the cabinet failed to obtain a parliamentary vote of confidence. USR ministers were threatened with dismissal after refusing to sign the PNDL program for the barons PSD-PNL

On 7 February 2022, Cioloș resigned as USR president and Cătălin Drulă became acting president.

=== Drulă presidency (2022–2024) ===
On 10 July 2022, Cătălin Drulă was elected president of USR with 71% of internal party votes, defeating Allen Coliban, Octavian Berceanu, and other candidates. During Drulă's term, USR remained in parliamentary opposition.

On 14 December 2023, USR, alongside the Force of the Right (Forța Dreptei) and the People's Movement Party (PMP), announced the formation of an opposition centre-right electoral alliance. On 18 December 2023, the alliance was formally named the United Right Alliance (Alianța Dreapta Unită, ADU).

At the 2024 local elections held on 9 June 2024, ADU 42 mayors and 46 county councillors At the European Parliament election held concurrently, ADU obtained 8.71%, electing 3 MEPs (2 USR, 1 PMP). Following the results, Drulă resigned.

=== Lasconi presidency, presidential elections and annulment (2024–2025) ===
On 26 June 2024, journalist and Câmpulung mayor Elena Lasconi was elected USR president and designated the party's candidate for the 2024 presidential election.

At the 2024 legislative election held on 1 December 2024, USR obtained 12.40% in the Chamber of Deputies and 12.26% in the Senate, finishing fourth behind PSD, AUR, and PNL, with 40 deputies and 19 senators.

At the 2024 presidential election held on 24 November 2024, Lasconi obtained 19.17% in the first round, finishing second behind the independent far-right candidate Călin Georgescu, and qualifying for the runoff. On 6 December 2024, the Romanian Constitutional Court annulled the first round, citing evidence of foreign electoral interference, and ordered a complete re-run of the election.

In the 2025 re-run election, USR's National Bureau decided on 9 April 2025 to withdraw its endorsement of Lasconi and instead support Nicușor Dan, the independent mayor of Bucharest and party founder, citing his higher chance of qualifying for the runoff. Lasconi nevertheless remained on the ballot as USR's official candidate. In the first round held on 4 May 2025, Lasconi obtained 2.68% while Nicușor Dan finished second with 20.99%. In the runoff on 18 May 2025, Nicușor Dan defeated AUR leader George Simion with 53.60% of the vote, becoming the President of Romania. Lasconi resigned as USR president the day after.

=== Fritz presidency and government participation (2025–present) ===
On 13 June 2025, Dominic Fritz, mayor of Timișoara since 2020, was elected USR president with 67.2% of internal votes, defeating Senator Violeta Alexandru (22%). His candidacy was based on a "reset" of the party - „We will begin a period of reconstruction and new energy in the party”.

On 23 June 2025, the Bolojan coalition government (PSD–PNL–USR–UDMR) received the parliamentary vote of confidence. USR received four ministerial portfolios: Ionuț Moșteanu — Minister of National Defence, and Deputy Prime Minister, Oana Țoiu — Minister of Foreign Affairs, Radu Miruță — Minister of Economy, Digitalization, Entrepreneurship and Tourism, Diana Buzoianu — Minister of Environment, Water and Forests

The Bolojan government inherited the European Union's highest budget deficit (over 9% of GDP). On 23 April 2026, PSD withdrew from the coalition, leaving it without a parliamentary majority. On 5 May 2026, a no-confidence motion jointly tabled by PSD and AUR passed with 281 votes in favour and 4 against, dismissing the Bolojan government.

USR ministers have managed to achieve several reforms such as the fight against the forest mafia, investments such as the SAFE program, the fight for transparency such as the publication of RAPPS buildings.

== Political programme ==
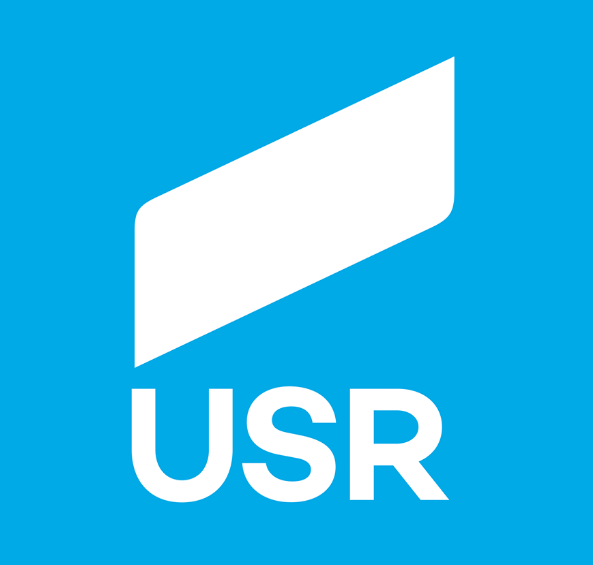
Initial official logo of the USR

On 5 October 2016, the Save Romania Union (USR) had officially launched its political programme, with nine chapters on the following areas: transparency, industry, agriculture, education, culture, health, infrastructure, environmental protection, and foreign policy.

USR advocates for maximum transparency, industrialization with modern means, support for small farmers, education reform, a new paradigm in the cultural field, granting 6% of GDP for Health, construction of highways and infrastructure in collaboration with European partners, environmental protection in particular by stopping deforestation as well as close cooperation with the European Union (EU), NATO, and support for accession in these international organizations for neighbouring Republic of Moldova and Ukraine. The president of the USR, Nicușor Dan, said that the program is still in public debate, and could be improved in the nearest future, according to the society's suggestions and recommendations.

In October 2016, the USR declared the public endorsement for then Prime Minister Dacian Cioloș for a new mandate, following the December's parliamentary elections. On 26 October 2016, the Save Romania Union (USR) has announced several candidates for the parliamentary elections in 2016. Mihai Goțiu, journalist and civic activist, writer Dan Lungu, former ministers from Cioloș Vlad Vladrescu's cabinet and Cristian Ghinea, with former state secretaries of the cabinet have joined the project.

== Ideology and issues ==
The party has been described as one "whose chief identity marker is not a clear program or ideology, but the profile of its candidates." It has also been referred to as a bringing together of "neoliberals, environmentalists, left-liberals, genuine social democrats, Christian Democrats, NGO supporters and minority rights activists". Another source labelled the party as "a diverse group of activists, academics and people from business and the arts, which grew out of a Save Bucharest movement to protect the city’s historic buildings." Its politics have been labelled by some as syncretic.

Dan Barna, the former president of USR, characterized the party as "generally centre-right", leaning centre-right on economic policy and centrist in terms of social policy. However, USR has a substantial amount of both progressive and conservative members. He compared the party with Emmanuel Macron's Renaissance, while mentioning that the key difference between the two is that USR predominantly consists of people who have not been involved in politics before. The party has also an economic libertarian faction, which is centered around the economist Claudiu Năsui.

=== Anti-corruption campaign ===
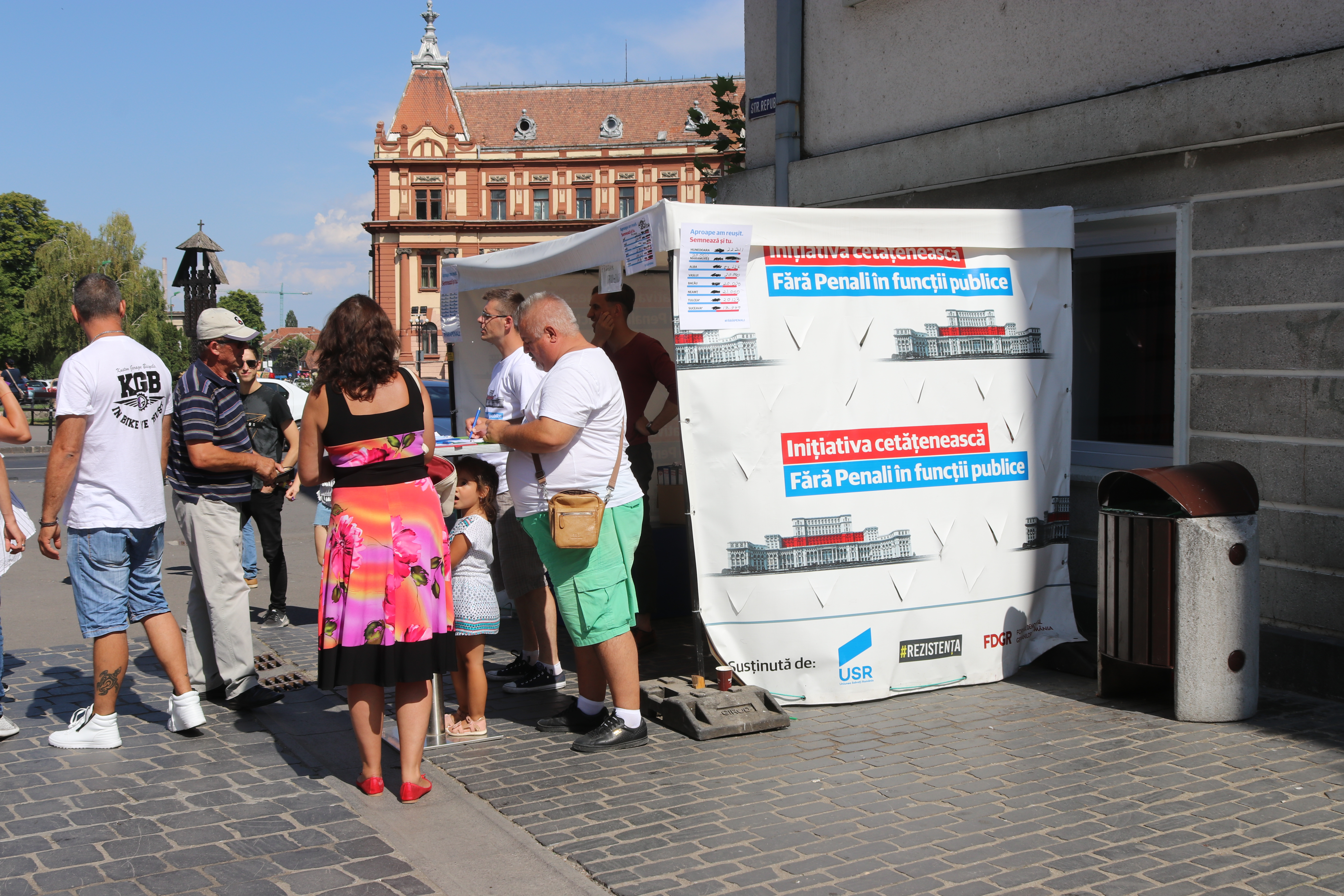
Activists collecting signatures for the "No criminals in public office" campaign in Brașov, Brașov County, Transylvania, Romania (August 2018)

Since its foundation, USR has advocated for the anti-corruption drive in Romania and the activity of the National Anticorruption Directorate. During the 2017–2019 Romanian protests, USR was against the modifications to the justice laws initiated by the government coalition PSD-ALDE and requested the rejection of OUG 13.

In 2018, USR helped and endorsed the initiators of Fără Penali în Funcții Publice ("No Convicts in Public Office") civic campaign, whose objective is to bar the persons convicted to final imprisonment sentences for intentional offences from being elected to local government, the Chamber of Deputies, the Senate, or the office of President of Romania by amending the Article 37 of the Romanian Constitution (which regulates the nomination rules). USR and volunteers collected more than 1 million signatures from eligible voters.

=== Republic of Moldova ===
USR advocates for the Party of Action and Solidarity (PAS) led by Maia Sandu, and highlights the European path of Moldova. At the June 2018 elections for the Chișinău mayoralty, USR endorsed the candidate of the pro-European forces, more specifically Andrei Năstase. Subsequently, with the invalidation of the mandate by Judge Rodica Berdilo, Dan Barna stated:

"The invalidation of the vote for putting Andrei Năstase into office in the Chișinău mayoralty shows what can happen when corruption is the rule of a state. The decision of the Chișinău court shows that the interests of the oligarchs do not take into account the democratic processes and can steal the vote of the citizens. What is happening at the moment in Chișinău shows how fierce the fight for democracy and fair justice is in both Romania and Moldova."

=== Ukraine ===
The Save Romania Union promotes Ukrainophilic positions and advocates for stronger Romanian support to Ukraine, especially since the Russian invasion of Ukraine.

=== LGBT rights ===
USR's position on LGBT issues is not clearly defined. In 2018, the ex-party leader, Dan Barna, declared: "Gay marriage is not yet a subject for the public agenda, there is no initiative promoting same-sex marriage. Maybe in 20, 30 years next generations will take care of this problem, but for now, this is not a priority." USR was the only parliamentary party in Romania that was against the constitutional referendum, proposed by Coaliția pentru Familie (CpF) and endorsed by the Romanian Orthodox Church. The constitutional amendment proposed to change the definition of family in order to prohibit same-sex marriage but failed as the turnout was only 21.1%, below the required voter turnout threshold of 30%. USR considered the referendum a way to divide the Romanian people and to distract the attention from the real issues Romania is facing, such as corruption.

=== Roșia Montană ===
USR advocated for the inclusion of the Roşia Montană site in UNESCO World Heritage. At the 42nd session of the UNESCO World Heritage Committee, held in Manama, Bahrain, the government's representative, Ștefan Răzvan Rab, state secretary of the Ministry of Culture, in Bahrain, on June 24 to July 4, asked for postponement on behalf of Romania including the Roșia Montană Mining Cultural Landscape in the World Heritage List until the completion of the judicial dispute with Gabriel Resources. USR Senator Vlad Alexandrescu, under whose Ministry of Culture 2015–2016 Roșia Montană was included in the UNESCO indicative list, accused the PSD-ALDE government coalition of treason, writing in a post on 2 July 2018 on Facebook:

"It is Romania's most shameful moment since being a member of UNESCO. All the other states of the world carry a fierce negotiation these days so that their monuments are included in the UNESCO list, and each success is welcomed with cheers and cheers. In contrast to the civilized world is Romania. The only state that has campaigned for its monument not to be on this list. A state seized by a bunch of villains who do not give a damn about the importance of heritage. All they want is to leave UNESCO in peace with their ideas, to make a crater over Roșia Montană so that they can fill their pockets. Of course, the rest of the states know this, not everyone is as "professional" as our government. And so we will be known from now on, those who sell their patrimony for the welfare of their politicians. What you have done here, members and representatives of the Government, is treason. You have acted so that our patrimony is reduced to a crater in the near future. And this will not be without consequences, I promise you!"

=== European affiliation ===
USR is a strong supporter of Romania's membership of the European Union (EU) and is in favor of a joint European external policy and military and of Romania's accession to the Schengen Area. While not being part of any European political party during its first 3 years of existence, USR has had negotiations with Alliance of Liberals and Democrats for Europe Party (ALDE) and to a lesser extent with the European People's Party (EPP) and the European Greens (EGP). USR's hesitation to join ALDE was due to the fact that a Romanian party they vehemently opposed at that time (which was part of a governmental coalition with the PSD), more specifically the Alliance of Liberals and Democrats (ALDE), was already part of that European party and had the same acronym.

In May 2019, the party stated that it would take part in the new liberal group in the European Parliament that includes France's La République En Marche!, named Renew Europe in June 2019. On 30 May 2019, the Alliance of Liberals and Democrats withdrew from ALDE. Therefore, with no more obstacles on its way, USR joined ALDE on 28 June 2019.

== Notable members ==
=== Internal Organization ===
Current President: Dominic Fritz (since June 13, 2025).

The National Bureau (Biroul Național) constitutes the party's central executive body. It is currently composed of the following individuals:

- Dominic Fritz, President, Mayor of Timișoara
- Ionuț Moșteanu, Deputy, Minister of National Defense
- Ștefan Pălărie, Senator, president of the USR group at the Senat
- George Florin Garbacea
- Adrian Wiener, Deputy
- Vlad Voiculescu, Member of the European Parliament, President of the USR Bucharest branch
- Oana Silvia Țoiu, Minister of External Affairs
- Ștefan Tanasă, Deputy
- Lucian-Daniel Stanciu-Viziteu, Mayor of Bacău
- Cristina Mădălina Prună, Deputy
- Andrei Nistor, Prefect of Bucarest
- Claudiu Năsui, Deputy
- Oana Murariu, Deputy
- Clotilde Armand, Local councilor of the 1st sector of Bucharest
- Radu Miruță, Minister of Economy
- Radu Nicolae Mihaiu, Deputy
- Liviu Mălureanu
- Stelian Ion, Deputy
- Adrian Echert, Deputy
- Cezar Mihail Drăgoescu, Deputy
- Silvia Dinică, Secretary of State to the Minister of Labour, Family, Youth, and Social Solidarity
- Anisia Georgiana Costescu, Mayor or Dumbrăvița
- Allen Coliban, Deputy
- Horia Daniel Bogdan, President of the USR Diaspora subsidiary
- Cristian Mihai Baciu, Local councilor of the 6th sector of Bucharest

The USR also has departmental (județean) and local (municipal and communal) branches, each with its own executive office. The party is represented in most of the country's municipal and departmental councils, as well as in Parliament and the government.

The National Arbitration and Integrity Commission (Comisia Națională de Arbitraj și Integritate) ensures compliance with the statutes and internal discipline, while the National Ethics Commission oversees internal disputes.

The party also maintains a youth organization, USR Tineret, as well as several thematic structures dedicated to environmental, digital, European, and economic policy.

=== Current members ===
- Elena Lasconi - former party president and current mayor of Câmpulung.
- Dan Barna - current MEP, former presidential candidate in 2019, former Deputy Prime Minister, and former party president.
- Vlad Voiculescu - current MEP, former Minister of Health and current party vice-president.
- Cătălin Drulă - former Minister of Transport and former party president.
- Clotilde Armand - former MEP and former mayor of Sector 1.
- Dominic Fritz - current mayor of Timișoara.
- Allen Coliban - former mayor of Brașov.
- Claudiu Năsui - former Minister of Economy, Entrepreneurship and Tourism.
- Cristian Ghinea - former MEP and Minister of European Funds.
- Vlad Botoș - former MEP.
- Radu Panait - digital entrepreneur and deputy.

=== Former members ===
- Nicușor Dan - former party president (first party president) and founder as well as former Mayor of Bucharest (2020-2025) and current President of Romania.
- Dacian Cioloș - former Prime Minister and former party president.
- Lavinia Cosma - former deputy, current leader of the Green Party of Romania (PV).
- Nicolae Ștefănuță - current MEP.
- Vlad Gheorghe - former MEP.
- Ramona Strugariu - former MEP.
- Dragoș Pîslaru - former MEP.
- Alin Mituța - former MEP.
- Dragoș Tudorache - former MEP.
- Adrian Dohotaru - former deputy, civic activist.
- Ioana Mihăilă - former Minister of Health in the Cîțu cabinet.
- Andrei Lupu - former deputy.

== Party leaders ==
Also served as independent/technocratic Prime Minister between late 2015 and early 2017

Nº	Name born – died	Portrait	Term start	Term end	Duration
1	Nicușor Dan (1969– )		28 July 2016	1 June 2017	10 months and 4 days
–	Elek Levente (1971– )		1 June 2017	28 October 2017	4 months and 27 days
2	Dan Barna (1975– )		28 October 2017	1 October 2021	3 years, 11 months and 3 days
3	Dacian Cioloș (1969– )		1 October 2021	7 February 2022	4 months and 6 days
–	Cătălin Drulă (1981– )		7 February 2022	10 July 2022	5 months and 3 days
4	Cătălin Drulă (1981– )		10 July 2022	10 June 2024	1 year and 11 months
—	Dominic Fritz (1983– )		10 June 2024	26 June 2024	16 days
5	Elena-Valerica Lasconi (1972– )		26 June 2024	5 May 2025	10 months and 9 days
—	Dominic Fritz (1983– )		5 May 2025	13 June 2025	1 month and 8 days
6	Dominic Fritz (1983– )		13 June 2025	present	1 year, 4 months and 11 days

== Electoral history ==
=== Legislative elections ===
Election	Chamber			Senate			Position	Aftermath
Election	Votes	%	Seats	Votes	%	Seats	Position	Aftermath
2016	625,154	8.87	30 / 329	629,375	8.92	13 / 136	3rd	Opposition to PSD-ALDE government (2017–2019)
2016	625,154	8.87	30 / 329	629,375	8.92	13 / 136	3rd	Opposition to PSD minority government (2019)
2016	625,154	8.87	30 / 329	629,375	8.92	13 / 136	3rd	Endorsing PNL minority government (2019–2020)
2020	906,962	15.37	38 / 330	936,862	15.86	17 / 136	3rd (within USR PLUS)	PNL-USR PLUS-UDMR government (2020–2021)
2020	906,962	15.37	38 / 330	936,862	15.86	17 / 136	3rd (within USR PLUS)	Opposition to PNL-UDMR minority government (2021)
2020	906,962	15.37	38 / 330	936,862	15.86	17 / 136	3rd (within USR PLUS)	Opposition to CNR government (2021–2024)
2024	1,146,357	12.40	40 / 331	1,134,831	12.26	19 / 136	4th	
2024	1,146,357	12.40	40 / 331	1,134,831	12.26	19 / 136	4th	Opposition to PSD-PNL-UDMR minority government (2024–2025)
2024	1,146,357	12.40	40 / 331	1,134,831	12.26	19 / 136	4th	Opposition to PNL-UDMR minority government (2025)
2024	1,146,357	12.40	40 / 331	1,134,831	12.26	19 / 136	4th	PSD-PNL-USR-UDMR government (2025–2026)
2024	1,146,357	12.40	40 / 331	1,134,831	12.26	19 / 136	4th	PNL-USR-UDMR minority government (2026)
2024	1,146,357	12.40	40 / 331	1,134,831	12.26	19 / 136	4th	Opposition to PSD minority government (2026–present)

=== Local elections ===
==== National results ====
Election	County Councilors (CJ)			Mayors			Local Councilors (CL)			Popular vote	%	Position
Election	Votes	%	Seats	Votes	%	Seats	Votes	%	Seats	Popular vote	%	Position
2016	143,544	1.73	15 / 1,434	96,789	1.13	0 / 3,186	121,099	1.44	39 / 40,067	143,544	1.73	7th (as USB)
2020	478,659	6.65	36 / 1,340	490,362	6.58	20 / 3,176	504,563	6.85	856 / 39,900	696,478	8.89	3rd (as part of the 2020 USR-PLUS Alliance)
2024	653,476	8.29	46 / 1,338	550,850	6.28	28 / 3,180	583,042	6.70	832 / 39,900	550,850	6.28	5th (as part of ADU)

==== County results ====
Map of the results of the 2020 Romanian local elections. In blue are the counties in which USR-PLUS gained County Councillors (CJ) and in gray are the counties in which it did not pass the threshold to do so.

Election	County	Votes	%	Councillors	+/-	Aftermath
2020	Alba	13,949	9.5 (#3)	4 / 32	▲4	Opposition
2020	Arad	20,712	12.8 (#2)	5 / 32	▲5	Opposition
2020	Argeș	26,594	10.7 (#3)	4 / 34	▲4	Opposition
2020	Bacău	61,621	27.0 (#2)	3 / 36	▲3	Opposition
2020	Bihor	5,741	2.3 (#5)	0 / 34	0	No seats
2020	Bistrița-Năsăud	5,476	4.4 (#4)	0 / 30	0	No seats
2020	Botoșani	5,539	3.6 (#5)	0 / 32	0	No seats
2020	Brăila	5,837	5.3 (#4)	0 / 30	0	No seats
2020	Brașov	39,013	19.3 (#3)	8 / 34	▲8	PNL–USR
2020	Brașov	39,013	19.3 (#3)	8 / 34	▲8	Opposition
2020	Bucharest	175,953	27.0 (#2)	17 / 55	▲2	USR–PNL
2020	Buzău	11,866	6.6 (#4)	0 / 32	0	No seats
2020	Călărași	46,932	37.3 (#2)	4 / 30	▲4	Opposition
2020	Caraș-Severin	6,281	5.3 (#4)	0 / 30	0	No seats
2020	Cluj	30,701	12.2 (#3)	5 / 36	▲5	Opposition
2020	Constanța	34,896	13.0 (#3)	5 / 36	▲5	PNL–USR
2020	Covasna	1,836	2.7 (#9)	0 / 30	0	No seats
2020	Dâmbovița	6,054	2.9 (#5)	0 / 34	0	No seats
2020	Dolj	17,563	6.7 (#4)	0 / 36	0	No seats
2020	Galați	11,844	6.0 (#3)	0 / 34	0	No seats
2020	Giurgiu	4,194	3.4 (#5)	0 / 30	0	No seats
2020	Gorj	6,373	4.2 (#5)	0 / 32	0	No seats
2020	Harghita	1,330	1.3 (#7)	0 / 30	0	No seats
2020	Hunedoara	12,949	7.9 (#4)	2 / 32	▲2	Opposition
2020	Ialomița	6,096	5.7 (#4)	0 / 30	0	No seats
2020	Iași	39,416	14.6 (#3)	6 / 36	▲6	Opposition
2020	Ilfov	26,389	14.5 (#2)	5 / 32	▲5	Opposition
2020	Maramureș	14,143	7.7 (#4)	3 / 34	▲3	PNL–USR
2020	Mehedinți	2,876	2.4 (#5)	0 / 30	0	No seats
2020	Mureș	6,908	3.4 (#6)	0 / 34	0	No seats
2020	Neamț	19,564	10.7 (#3)	4 / 34	▲4	Opposition
2020	Olt	5,019	2.5 (#5)	0 / 32	0	No seats
2020	Prahova	131,179	45.9 (#1)	8 / 36	▲8	PNL–USR (2020–2021)
2020	Prahova	131,179	45.9 (#1)	8 / 36	▲8	Opposition (2021–2024)
2020	Sălaj	6,851	7.0 (#4)	2 / 30	▲2	Endorsement
2020	Satu Mare	7,072	5.4 (#5)	0 / 32	0	No seats
2020	Sibiu	15,573	10.1 (#4)	4 / 32	▲4	Opposition
2020	Suceava	15,751	6.2 (#4)	0 / 36	0	No seats
2020	Teleorman	6,143	3.8 (#3)	0 / 32	0	No seats
2020	Timiș	55,155	21.5 (#2)	10 / 36	▲10	PNL–USR (2020)
2020	Timiș	55,155	21.5 (#2)	10 / 36	▲10	Opposition (2020–2024)
2020	Tulcea	5,288	6.1 (#4)	0 / 30	0	No seats
2020	Vâlcea	8,319	5.2 (#4)	0 / 32	0	No seats
2020	Vaslui	12,140	8.4 (#4)	3 / 34	▲3	Opposition
2020	Vrancea	58,610	41.0 (#2)	5 / 32	▲5	Endorsement (2020–2021)
2020	Vrancea	58,610	41.0 (#2)	5 / 32	▲5	Opposition (2021–2024)

2024 Romanian Local Election

Election	County	Votes	%	Councillors	+/-
2024	Alba	11.416	7.1 (#4)	0 / 32	▼4
2024	Arad	15.761	8.6 (#4)	2 / 32	▼3
2024	Argeș	35.734	13.5 (#3)	3 / 34	▼1
2024	Bacău	25.416	10.3 (#4)	2 / 36	▼1
2024	Bihor	6.226	2.3 (#5)	0 / 34	0
2024	Bistrița-Năsăud	8.408	6.2 (#5)	0 / 30	0
2024	Botoșani	5.996	3.7 (#4)	0 / 32	0
2024	Brăila	6.533	5.2 (#4)	0 / 30	0
2024	Brașov	39,013	22.8 (#2)	7 / 34	▼1
2024	Bucharest	200.102	27.6 (#1)	13 / 55	▼4
2024	Buzău	14.577	7.7 (#4)	0 / 32	0
2024	Călărași	6.290	4.8 (#4)	0 / 30	▼4
2024	Caraș-Severin	6.839	5.5 (#4)	0 / 30	0
2024	Cluj	44.548	14.8 (#3)	5 / 36	0
2024	Constanța	36.752	12.7 (#4)	3 / 36	▼2
2024	Covasna	1,836	2.7 (#9)	0 / 30	0
2024	Dâmbovița	6,054	2.9 (#5)	0 / 34	0
2024	Dolj	17,563	6.7 (#4)	0 / 36	0
2024	Galați	11,844	6.0 (#3)	0 / 34	0
2024	Giurgiu	4,194	3.4 (#5)	0 / 30	0
2024	Gorj	6,373	4.2 (#5)	0 / 32	0
2024	Harghita	1,330	1.3 (#7)	0 / 30	0
2024	Hunedoara	12,949	7.9 (#4)	2 / 32	▲2
2024	Ialomița	6,096	5.7 (#4)	0 / 30	0
2024	Iași	39,416	14.6 (#3)	6 / 36	▲6
2024	Ilfov	26,389	14.5 (#2)	5 / 32	▲5
2024	Maramureș	14,143	7.7 (#4)	3 / 34	▲3
2024	Mehedinți	2,876	2.4 (#5)	0 / 30	0
2024	Mureș	6,908	3.4 (#6)	0 / 34	0
2024	Neamț	19,564	10.7 (#3)	4 / 34	▲4
2024	Olt	5,019	2.5 (#5)	0 / 32	0
2024	Prahova	131,179	45.9 (#1)	8 / 36	▲8
2024	Sălaj	6,851	7.0 (#4)	2 / 30	▲2
2024	Satu Mare	7,072	5.4 (#5)	0 / 32	0
2024	Sibiu	15,573	10.1 (#4)	4 / 32	▲4
2024	Suceava	15,751	6.2 (#4)	0 / 36	0
2024	Teleorman	6,143	3.8 (#3)	0 / 32	0
2024	Timiș	55,155	21.5 (#2)	10 / 36	▲10
2024	Tulcea	5,288	6.1 (#4)	0 / 30	0
2024	Vâlcea	8,319	5.2 (#4)	0 / 32	0
2024	Vaslui	12,140	8.4 (#4)	3 / 34	▲3
2024	Vrancea	58,610	41.0 (#2)	5 / 32	▲5

==== Major cities ====
===== 2020–2024 =====
City	Mayor	#	Local Council				
City	Mayor	#	Votes	Percentage	Council	Swing	Aftermath
Sector 1 (Bucharest)	40.95 / 100	1	26,675	30.0 (#2)	9 / 27	▲1	USR–PNL (2020–2021)
Sector 1 (Bucharest)	40.95 / 100	1	26,675	30.0 (#2)	9 / 27	▲1	USR-PLUS minority (2021–2024)
Sector 2 (Bucharest)	36.91 / 100	1	33,145	29.1 (#2)	9 / 27	▲4	USR–PNL
Sector 3 (Bucharest)	28.48 / 100	2	34,236	25.7 (#1)	9 / 31	▲1	Opposition
Sector 4 (Bucharest)	29.88 / 100	2	28,999	28.5 (#2)	9 / 27	▲3	Opposition
Sector 5 (Bucharest)	25.24 / 100	3	14,838	16.5 (#3)	5 / 27	0	Opposition
Sector 6 (Bucharest)	43.40 / 100	1	30,657	24.8 (#3)	8 / 27	▲1	PNL–USR
Cluj-Napoca	8.27 / 100	2	16,691	17.1 (#2)	5 / 27	▲5	Opposition
Timișoara	53.25 / 100	1	37,977	41.4 (#1)	13 / 27	▲13	USR–PNL (2020)
Timișoara	53.25 / 100	1	37,977	41.4 (#1)	13 / 27	▲13	USR minority (2020–2024)
Iași	30.31 / 100	2	24,785	29.0 (#2)	9 / 27	▲9	Opposition
Brașov	42.06 / 100	1	26,525	32.7 (#1)	12 / 27	▲12	USR–PNL
Brașov	42.06 / 100	1	26,525	32.7 (#1)	12 / 27	▲12	USR minority (2021–2024)
Constanța	24.31 / 100	2	22,773	23.9 (#2)	9 / 27	▲9	PNL–USR-PLUS

===== 2024–2028 =====
City	Mayor	#	Local Council				
City	Mayor	#	Votes	Percentage	Council	Swing	Aftermath
Sector 1 (Bucharest)	35.92 / 100	2	34.688	35.6 (#2)	11 / 27	▲2	Opposition
Sector 2 (Bucharest)	42.97 / 100	2	41.989	34.2 (#2)	10 / 27	▲1	Opposition
Sector 3 (Bucharest)	20.68 / 100	2	48.418	32.0 (#2)	11 / 31	▲2	Opposition
Sector 4 (Bucharest)	19.61 / 100	2	30.359	26.3 (#2)	8 / 27	▼1	Opposition
Sector 5 (Bucharest)	21.57 / 100	2	21.542	22.0 (#3)	7 / 27	▲2	Opposition
Sector 6 (Bucharest)	11.63 / 100	2	33.890	23.9 (#3)	7 / 27	▼1	Opposition
Cluj-Napoca	5.89 / 100	4	22.976	18.4 (#2)	5 / 27	0	Opposition
Timișoara	49.70 / 100	1	44.109	41.8 (#1)	13 / 27	0	USR minority
Iași	26.05 / 100	2	23.328	21.5 (#2)	7 / 27	▼2	Opposition
Brașov	43.72 / 100	2	39.593	36.6 (#2)	11 / 27	▼1	Opposition
Constanța	20.76 / 100	2	21.348	20.4 (#3)	6 / 27	▼3	PNL–USR

==== Mayor of Bucharest ====
Election	Candidate	First round		
Election	Candidate	Votes	Percentage	Position
2016	Nicușor Dan	175,119	30.52	2nd
2020	Nicușor Dan^{1}	282,631	42.81	1st
2024	Nicușor Dan^{1}	351,209	47.94	1st
2025	Cătălin Drulă	81,310	13.90	4th

Notes:
^{1} Independent candidate endorsed by USR

=== Presidential elections ===
Election	Candidate	First round			Second round		
Election	Candidate	Votes	Percentage	Position	Votes	Percentage	Position
2019	Dan Barna^{1}	1,384,450	15.02%	3rd	not qualified		
2024	Elena Lasconi	1,772,500	19.17%	2nd	election annulled		
2025	Elena Lasconi^{2}	252,571	2.68%	5th	not qualified		
2025	Nicușor Dan^{3}	1,979,767	20.99%	2nd	6,168,642	53.60%	1st

Notes:
^{1} Dan Barna was the candidate endorsed by the 2020 USR-PLUS Alliance.
^{2} Withdrew support during the campaign in support of Nicușor Dan, but Lasconi remained on the ballot as the USR candidate and was nevertheless supported by several branches of USR.
^{3} Independent candidate endorsed by USR.

=== European elections ===
Election	Votes	%	MEPs	Position	EU Party	EP Group
2019	2,028,236	22.36	4 / 32	3rd (within USR PLUS)^{1}	—	RE
2024	778,901	8.71	2 / 33	3rd (within ADU)^{2}	ALDE	RE

Notes:
^{1} 2020 USR-PLUS Alliance members: USR and PLUS (4 MEPs each).
^{2} ADU members: USR (2 MEPs), PMP (1 MEP) and FD (no mandates).
