= Cătălin Drulă =

Romanian politician (born 1981)

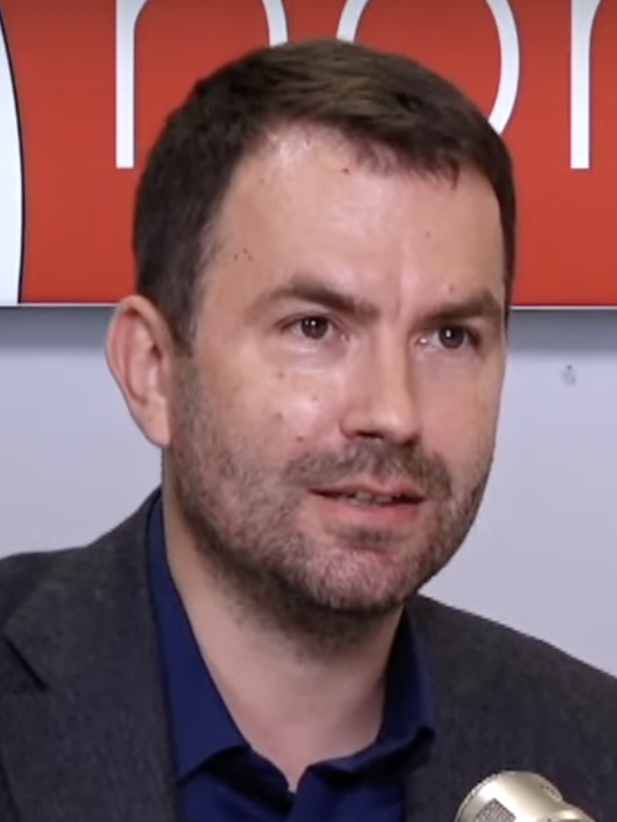

President of the Save Romania Union
- In office 10 July 2022 – 10 June 2024; Acting: 7 February 2022 – 10 July 2022
- Preceded by: Dacian Cioloș
- Succeeded by: Elena Lasconi

Minister of Transport and Infrastructure
- In office 23 December 2020 – 7 September 2021
- President: Klaus Iohannis
- Prime Minister: Florin Cîțu
- Preceded by: Lucian Bode
- Succeeded by: Dan Vîlceanu (acting/ad interim)

Personal details
- Born: 2 May 1981 (age 45) Bucharest, Romania
- Party: USR (2016–present)
- Education: University of Toronto

Cătălin Drulă (Romanian pronunciation: [kətəˈlin ˈdrulə]; born 2 May 1981) is a Romanian politician who served as the president of the Save Romania Union (USR) political party, until his resignation in 2024 (officially since 10 July 2022 onwards and previously acting/ad interim for c. 5 months before), and as an incumbent member of the Romanian Chamber of Deputies, elected as a deputy for Timiș County at the 2020 Romanian legislative election.

== Biography ==
Born in Bucharest, Drulă went to high school at the city's Tudor Vianu National College of Computer Science (1995–1999). He pursued his studies at the University of Toronto, graduating in 2002 with a degree in computer engineering. After spending a year at the Grenoble Institute of Technology on an exchange program, he obtained in 2005 an MS degree in computer science from the University of Toronto, with thesis "Fast and Energy Efficient Neighbour Discovery for Opportunistic Networking with Bluetooth".

== Political career ==
From 23 December 2020, he served as the Minister of Transport in the Cîțu Cabinet, until his resignation registered on 7 September 2021. According to USR MP Emanuel Ungureanu, he could likely be the presidential candidate of USR for the forthcoming 2024 Romanian presidential election.

Since 7 February 2022, he has been serving as the ad interim president of the USR, as a result of the resignation of Dacian Cioloș. Following the poor results of the United Right Alliance in the 2024 Romanian local elections and the 2024 European Parliament election in Romania on 9 June 2024, he announced his resignation from the leadership of USR.
