= 2024 Romanian local elections =

- 9 June 2024
- County Council elections
- All 41 County Council Presidents; All 1,338 County Council Councilors (Note: The total number of County Councilors in the country decreased by 2 since the 2020 election, as Ilfov County gained 2, while Gorj County and Teleorman County lost 2 each)
Party	Leader	Vote %	Seats	+/–
County Council Presidents
PSD	Marcel Ciolacu	35.56	25	+5
PNL	Nicolae Ciucă	29.15	12	−5
UDMR	Hunor Kelemen	6.04	4	0
County Council Councilors
PSD	Marcel Ciolacu	33.50	550	+188
PNL	Nicolae Ciucă	27.63	436	−53
AUR	George Simion	10.70	159	+159
UDMR	Hunor Kelemen	6.43	104	+12
USR	Cătălin Drulă	8.29	46	−62
PMP	Eugen Tomac	ADU	17	−48
FD	Ludovic Orban	ADU	17	New
FDGR	Paul-Jürgen Porr	0.29	5	0
Others	—	8.90	4	
This lists parties that won seats. See the complete results below.
- Mayor & Local Council elections
- All 3,180 Mayors; All 39,900 Local Council Councilors
Party	Leader	Vote %	Seats	+/–
Mayors
PSD	Marcel Ciolacu	34.74	1677	+315
PNL	Nicolae Ciucă	29.07	1132	−100
UDMR	Hunor Kelemen	4.31	200	+1
AUR	George Simion	6.26	30	+27
USR	Cătălin Drulă	6.28	28	−17
FD	Ludovic Orban	ADU	10	New
PMP	Eugen Tomac	ADU	6	−44
Others	—	25.6	93	−143
Local Council Councilors
PSD	Marcel Ciolacu	32.56	16.509	+2.689
PNL	Nicolae Ciucă	26.16	12.802	−2.601
UDMR	Hunor Kelemen	5.42	2525	+165
AUR	George Simion	9.54	3509	+3430
USR	Cătălin Drulă	6.70	830	−26
FD	Ludovic Orban	ADU	254	New
PMP	Eugen Tomac	ADU	238	−1912
Others	—	17.28	3469	−2869
This lists parties that won seats. See the complete results below.

Local elections were held in Romania on 9 June 2024. They were the eighth post-1989 local elections in the country. The previous Romanian local elections in 2020 were won by the National Liberal Party (PNL), even though the Social Democratic Party (PSD) came in with significantly more County Council Presidents and mayors than the National Liberals.

Therefore, the de facto winner of the previous Romanian local elections was the Social Democratic Party, in spite of the de jure victory of the National Liberal Party, according to popular vote and thereby overall political score.

The 2020 USR-PLUS Alliance (which formally fused into a single political party and changed its name to the Save Romania Union) came in third with respect to popular vote yet failed to obtain an important nationwide representation (for mayors, local councilors or county councilors). Meanwhile, the PNL enlarged itself at local political level nationwide with the integral absorption of the Alliance of Liberals and Democrats (ALDE) during late March 2022.

The main five political contenders in the 2024 Romanian local elections were the Social Democratic Party, the National Liberal Party, the Alliance for the Union of Romanians, the United Right Alliance, and the Democratic Alliance of Hungarians in Romania.

== Background ==
The government that organized the local elections were the Ciolacu Cabinet representing the National Coalition for Romania (CNR), a grand coalition between the two largest political parties in Romania in terms of parliamentary and local representation.

In response to the formation of an electoral alliance between the two members of the CNR for the 2024 European Parliament election in Romania, as well as locally in some races, the Save Romania Union, People's Movement Party and Force of the Right came together to form the United Right Alliance.

Following the 2020 Romanian parliamentary election, the right-wing populist Alliance for the Union of Romanians became a new serious contender in Romanian politics. Ahead of the elections, the party organized a recruitment drive to enlarge its presence at a local level. As a result, it became the party with the third largest number of candidates after the PSD and PNL.

In Bucharest, incumbent mayor Nicușor Dan had expressed his intention to be a candidate again, hoping that he will be supported by the main centre-right political parties which previously endorsed him in the 2020 Romanian local elections. However, the National Liberal Party declined to support Nicușor Dan for another term as Mayor of Bucharest, choosing instead to form an electoral alliance with the Social Democrats and back a common candidate, namely Cătălin Cîrstoiu. After a brief scandal surrounding Cîrstoiu however, the two parties decided to run opposing candidates for the Mayor of Bucharest election, maintaining the alliance only at the sector level. Polling indicated the PSD candidate, Gabriela Firea was going to be the main competitor to Dan, who announced he will run as an independent candidate, as in 2020, and received the backing of the ADU and REPER.

Most opinion polls showed the Social Democratic Party (PSD) as either the main or overall winning party in several major cities and towns across Romania, including, most notably, the capital, Bucharest. The political trend, according to the polls, was that the Social Democratic Party is the dominant political party in the south and east of Romania (i.e. in Muntenia, Oltenia and Western Moldavia), the National Liberal Party in the centre and north of the country (i.e. in Transylvania and Bukovina), the Save Romania Union sporadically at urban level throughout the country, predominantly in the south-western part of the country, in Banat, and the Alliance for the Union of Romanians maintaining a somewhat consistent presence throughout the country, with lower scores in urban areas.

== Electoral system ==
Local elections are organized in Romania to elect 4 local authorities: the County Council President, County Council, mayor and Local Council. The electoral system for local elections in Romania is outlined in Law no. 115 of May 19, 2015. Candidates for the office of mayor, County Council President as well as Local and County Councils councilor are elected by popular vote. They serve a four-year term, with the possibility of re-election. Voters vote for candidates or lists of candidates competing in their specific constituency.

County		Communes, towns and municipalities	
Executive authority	Legislative authority	Executive authority	Legislative authority
County Council President	County Council	Mayor	Local Council

The mayors and County Council Presidents are elected in a single round of voting. The candidate who obtains the most validly cast votes is elected. In the event of a tie, a runoff voting round is organized. For County and Local Councils, the threshold for earning seats is determined by the constituency electoral bureau. It is 5% in the case of party lists, 7% for electoral alliances with two member parties, and 8% if the alliance includes three or more members.

Independent candidates can run for any of the offices up for election if they provide a list of names and signatures proving they are supported by at least 1% of eligible voters in the constituency where they intend to run. This number cannot be smaller than 100 people in communes, 500 in towns, 1,000 in municipalities and 2,000 for County-level offices.

== Results ==
=== Summary ===
Political party/alliance		County-level				U.A.T.-level			
Political party/alliance		County Council Presidents		County Council Councilors		Mayors		Local Council Councilors	
PSD		25 / 41	▲5	550 / 1,338	▲188	1,691 / 3,180		16,499 / 39,900	▲2679
PNL		12 / 41	▼5	436 / 1,338	▼53	1,144 / 3,180		12,767 / 39,900	▼1415
UDMR / RMDSZ		4 / 41	Steady	104 / 1,338	▲12	200 / 3,180		2,524 / 39,900	▲164
AUR		0 / 41	Steady	159 / 1,338	▲159	30 / 3,180		3,526 / 39,900	▲3447
ADU	USR	0 / 41	Steady	46 / 1,338	▼62	28 / 3,180		832 / 39,900	▼375
ADU	PMP	0 / 41	Steady	17 / 1,338	▼48	6 / 3,180		238 / 39,900	▼1899
ADU	FD	0 / 41	New	17 / 1,338	New	10 / 3,180	New	254 / 39,900	New
FDGR / DFDR		0 / 41	Steady	5 / 1,338	Steady	5 / 3,180		53 / 39,900	▼15
PUSL		0 / 41	Steady	2 / 1,338	▲2	6 / 3,180		225 / 39,900	▲59
AMT / EMSZ		0 / 41	Steady	2 / 1,338	▼5	4 / 3,180		172 / 39,900	▼134
REPER		0 / 41	New	0 / 1,338	New	2 / 3,180	New	54 / 39,900	New
AER	PER	0 / 41	Steady	0 / 1,338	▼5	1 / 3,180		79 / 39,900	▼295
AER	PV	0 / 41	Steady	0 / 1,338	Steady	0 / 3,180		38 / 39,900	▼79
Romania in Action		0 / 41	Steady	0 / 1,338	▼2	1 / 3,180	▲1	48 / 39,900	▲21
UIPS		0 / 41	Steady	0 / 1,338	Steady	1 / 3,180	Steady	TBD	
PPR		0 / 41	New	0 / 1,338	New	1 / 3,180	New	TBD	New
BSR		0 / 41	New	0 / 1,338	New	1 / 3,180	New	TBD	New
UUR		0 / 41	Steady	0 / 1,338	Steady	1 / 3,180	Steady	TBD	
UDSCR		0 / 41	Steady	0 / 1,338	Steady	1 / 3,180	Steady	TBD	
PRPE		0 / 41	Steady	0 / 1,338	Steady	1 / 3,180	▲1	TBD	
FCM / MPE		0 / 41	New	0 / 1,338	New	1 / 3,180	New	TBD	New
SOS RO		0 / 41	New	0 / 1,338	New	0 / 3,180	New	149 / 39,900	New
PRO		0 / 41	Steady	0 / 1,338	▼56	0 / 3,176	▼36	111 / 39,900	▼1774
PRM		0 / 41	Steady	0 / 1,338	Steady	0 / 3,180		22 / 39,900	▼9
POL		0 / 41	Steady	0 / 1,338	▼2	0 / 3,180		5 / 39,900	▼30
AD		0 / 41	Steady	0 / 1,338	Steady	0 / 3,180		4 / 39,900	▼9
Curaj		0 / 41	New	0 / 1,338	New	0 / 3,180	New	3 / 39,900	New
Demos		0 / 41	New	0 / 1,338	New	0 / 3,180	New	1 / 39,900	New
Independents		0 / 41		0 / 1,338		43 / 3,180		0 / 39,900	

=== Bucharest ===
General Council Election						Mayoral Election
Party		Votes	%	Seats	▲▼	Map
	ADU	200,102	27.61	17 (Note: Bucharest: USR-13, PMP-2, FD-2)	▼5	
Social Democratic Party	PSD	192,484	26.56	16	▼5	
	PNL	91,282	12.59	7	▼5	
	PUSL	67,988	9.38	6	▲6	
	AUR	59,205	8.16	5	▲5	
	REPER	52,139	7.19	4	▲4	
	Others	61,494	8.47	-		
Total		724,694	100%	55		
Turnout		41.24%▲				
Elected County Council
Source: Autoritatea Electorală Permanentă (AEP)

Candidate	Party	Votes	%
Nicușor Dan	Independent (ADU/REPER)	352,734	47.94
Gabriela Firea	PSD	163,147	22.17
Cristian Popescu Piedone	PUSL	111,411	15.14
Sebastian Burduja	PNL	57,336	7.79
Mihai Enache	AUR	22,208	3.02
Diana Șoșoacă	SOS RO	18,531	2.52
Alexandru Pânișoară	PER	3,871	0.53
Filip Constantin Titian	Independent	3,359	0.46
Dorin Iacob	AD	3,164	0.43
Total		735,761	100.00

=== Alba ===
- Political party of the elected County Council President

County Council Election					Mayoral Election
Party	Votes	%	Seats	▲▼	Map
PNL	70,840	44.07%	17	▼2	
PSD	44,609	27.75%	10	▲4	
AUR	19,926	12.39%	5	▲5	
ADU	11,416	7.10%	0 (Note: According to Romanian law, during local elections, the threshold for electoral alliances with 3 member parties is 8%.)	▼7	
Others	13,953	8.66%	-		
Total	160,744	100%	32		
Turnout	54.86%▲				
Elected County Council
Source: Autoritatea Electorală Permanentă (AEP)

=== Arad ===
- Political party of the elected County Council President

County Council Election					Mayoral Election
Party	Votes	%	Seats	▲▼	Map
PNL	70,474	38.39	13	▼4	
PSD	46,822	25.51	9	▲6	
AUR	27,349	14.90	5	▲5	
ADU	15,761	8.58	3 (Note: Arad: USR-2, PMP-1)	▼4	
UDMR/RMDSZ	12,831	6.99	2	Steady	
Others	10,291	5.60	-		
Total	183,528	100%	32		
Turnout	49.58%▲				
Elected County Council
Source: Autoritatea Electorală Permanentă (AEP)

=== Argeș ===
- Political party of the elected County Council President

County Council Election					Mayoral Election
Party	Votes	%	Seats	▲▼	Map
PSD	119,576	45.13	16	▼1	
PNL	56,114	21.18	8	▼3	
ADU	35,734	13.48	5 (Note: Argeș: USR-3, PMP-1, FD-1)	▲1	
AUR	35,703	13.47	5	▲5	
Others	17,811	6,71	-		
Total	264,938	100%	34		
Turnout	54.16%▲				
Elected County Council
Source: Autoritatea Electorală Permanentă (AEP)

=== Bacău ===
- Political party of the elected County Council President

County Council Election					Mayoral Election
Party	Votes	%	Seats	▲▼	Map
PSD	85,898	34.94	15	▼2	
PNL	70,019	28.48	12	▲4	
AUR	26,226	10.66	5	▲5	
ADU	25,416	10.33	4 (Note: Bacău: USR-3, PMP-1)	▼2	
Others	38,263	15.54	-		
Total	245,822	100%	36		
Turnout	44.79%▲				
Elected County Council
Source: Autoritatea Electorală Permanentă (AEP)

=== Bihor ===
- Political party of the elected County Council President

County Council Election					Mayoral Election
Party	Votes	%	Seats	▲▼	Map
PNL	137,176	50.84	18	▼4	
UDMR/RMDSZ	54,087	20.04	7	▲1	
PSD	48,227	17.87	7	▲1	
AUR	13,587	5.03	2	▲2	
Others	16,693	6.15	-		
Total	269,770	100%	34		
Turnout	55.88%▲				
Elected County Council
Source: Autoritatea Electorală Permanentă (AEP)

=== Bistrița-Năsăud ===
- Political party of the elected County Council President

County Council Election					Mayoral Election
Party	Votes	%	Seats	▲▼	Map
PSD	58,934	43.24	14	Steady	
PNL	38,911	28.55	10	▼2	
AUR	16,067	11.78	4	▲4	
UDMR/RMDSZ	8,859	6.50	2	▲2	
ADU	8,408	6.16	0	▼4	
Others	5,104	3.73	-		
Total	136,283	100%	30		
Turnout	55.74%▲				
Elected County Council
Source: Autoritatea Electorală Permanentă (AEP)

=== Botoșani ===
- Political party of the elected County Council President

County Council Election					Mayoral Election
Party	Votes	%	Seats	▲▼	Map
PSD	66,639	41.23	15	Steady	
PNL	66,370	41.06	14	▲2	
AUR	12,919	7.99	3	▲3	
Others	15,699	9.68	-		
Total	161,627	100%	32		
Turnout	45.94%▲				
Elected County Council
Source: Autoritatea Electorală Permanentă (AEP)

=== Brașov ===
- Political party of the elected County Council President

County Council Election					Mayoral Election
Party	Votes	%	Seats	▲▼	Map
PNL	74,676	30.48	11	▼5	
ADU	55,830	22.78	8 (Note: Brașov: USR-7, PMP-1)	Steady	
PSD	54,333	22.17	8	Steady	
AUR	28,154	11.49	4	▲4	
UDMR/RMDSZ	17,381	7.09	3	▲3	
Others	14,623	5.96	-		
Total	244,997	100%	34		
Turnout	49.81%▲				
Elected County Council
Source: Autoritatea Electorală Permanentă (AEP)

=== Brăila ===
- Political party of the elected County Council President

County Council Election					Mayoral Election
Party	Votes	%	Seats	▲▼	Map
PSD	63,568	50.77	18	▲1	
PNL	30,634	24.46	8	▼2	
AUR	14,393	11.49	4	▲4	
ADU	6,533	5.21	0	▼3	
Others	10,064	8.02	-		
Total	125,192	100%	30		
Turnout	47.72%▲				
Elected County Council
Source: Autoritatea Electorală Permanentă (AEP)

=== Buzău ===
- Political party of the elected County Council President

County Council Election					Mayoral Election
Party	Votes	%	Seats	▲▼	Map
PSD	104,192	54.79	21	Steady	
PNL	37,553	19.75	7	Steady	
AUR	20,861	10.97	4	▲4	
ADU	14,577	7.66	0	▼4	
Others	12,958	6.08	-		
Total	190,141	100%	32		
Turnout	55.01%▲				
Elected County Council
Source: Autoritatea Electorală Permanentă (AEP)

=== Caraș-Severin ===
- Political party of the elected County Council President

County Council Election					Mayoral Election
Party	Votes	%	Seats	▲▼	Map
PSD	50,523	40.45	14	▲4	
PNL	45,977	36.81	12	▼4	
AUR	14,584	11.67	4	▲4	
ADU	6,839	5.47	0	▼4	
Others	6,962	5.57	-		
Total		100%	30		
Turnout	51.62%▲				
Elected County Council
Source: Autoritatea Electorală Permanentă (AEP)

=== Călărași ===
- Political party of the elected County Council President

County Council Election					Mayoral Election
Party	Votes	%	Seats	▲▼	Map
PSD	66,459	50.53	17	▲2	
PNL	35,925	27.31	9	▼4	
AUR	15,557	11.82	4	▲4	
Others	13,572	10.31	-		
Total	131,513	100%	30		
Turnout	57.22%▲				
Elected County Council
Source: Autoritatea Electorală Permanentă (AEP)

=== Cluj ===
- Political party of the elected County Council President

County Council Election					Mayoral Election
Party	Votes	%	Seats	▲▼	Map
PNL	96,479	32.26	13	▼6	
PSD	53,445	17.87	7	▲2	
ADU	44,548	14.89	6 (Note: Cluj: USR-5, FD-1)	▼1	
UDMR/RMDSZ	43,477	14.53	6	▲1	
AUR	31,170	10.42	4	▲4	
Others	29,937	10.00	-		
Total	299,056	100%	36		
Turnout	50.06%▲				
Elected County Council
Source: Autoritatea Electorală Permanentă (AEP)

=== Constanța ===
- Political party of the elected County Council President

County Council Election					Mayoral Election
Party	Votes	%	Seats	▲▼	Map
PNL	104,970	36.36	15	Steady	
PSD	69,875	24.20	10	Steady	
AUR	45,635	15.81	6	▲6	
ADU	36,752	12.73	5 (Note: Constanța: USR-3, PMP-1, FD-1)	▼3	
Others	31,431	10.86	-		
Total	288,663	100%	36		
Turnout	49.19%▲				
Elected County Council
Source: Autoritatea Electorală Permanentă (AEP)

=== Covasna ===
- Political party of the elected County Council President

County Council Election					Mayoral Election
Party	Votes	%	Seats	▲▼	Map
UDMR/RMDSZ	56,730	66.53	22	Steady	
PSD	8,202	9.69	3	▲1	
PNL	6,906	8.10	3	Steady	
AUR	4,520	5.30	2	▲2	
Others	8,900	10.43	-		
Total	85,258	100%	30		
Turnout	50.74%▲				
Elected County Council
Source: Autoritatea Electorală Permanentă (AEP)

=== Dâmbovița ===
- Political party of the elected County Council President

County Council Election					Mayoral Election
Party	Votes	%	Seats	▲▼	Map
PSD	134,462	58.91	22	▲5	
PNL	57,029	24.98	9	▼4	
AUR	19,137	8.38	3	▲3	
ADU	13,853	6.07	0	Steady	
Others	3,734	1.63	-		
Total	228,215	100%	34		
Turnout	56.62%▲				
Elected County Council
Source: Autoritatea Electorală Permanentă (AEP)

=== Dolj ===
- Political party of the elected County Council President

County Council Election					Mayoral Election
Party	Votes	%	Seats	▲▼	Map
PSD	150,759	54.79	21	▲5	
PNL	64,699	23.51	9	▼4	
AUR	25,309	9.19	3	▲3	
ADU	22,109	8.03	3 (Note: Dolj: USR-1, PMP-1, FD-1)	▲1	
Others	12,244	4.44	-		
Total	275,120	100%	36		
Turnout	51.49%▲				
Elected County Council
Source: Autoritatea Electorală Permanentă (AEP)

=== Giurgiu ===
- Political party of the elected County Council President

County Council Election					Mayoral Election
Party	Votes	%	Seats	▲▼	Map
PNL	69,983	55.07	17	▼1	
PSD	35,950	28.29	9	▼3	
AUR	10,171	8.00	2	▲2	
USR	7,488	5.89	2	▲2	
Others	3,477	2.73	-		
Total	127,069	100%	30		
Turnout	60.01%▲				
Elected County Council
Source: Autoritatea Electorală Permanentă (AEP)

=== Harghita ===
- Political party of the elected County Council President

County Council Election					Mayoral Election
Party	Votes	%	Seats	▲▼	Map
UDMR/RMDSZ	95,650	74.69	24	▲5	
PSD	9,324	7.28	2	▼1	
AMT/EMSZ	9,290	7.25	2	▼2	
PNL	6,560	5.12	2	Steady	
Others	7,228	5.63	-		
Total	128,052	100%	30		
Turnout	50.72%▲				
Elected County Council
Source: Autoritatea Electorală Permanentă (AEP)

=== Ialomița ===
- Political party of the elected County Council President

County Council Election					Mayoral Election
Party	Votes	%	Seats	▲▼	Map
PSD	53,064	47.78	17	▲3	
PNL	26,515	23.87	8	▼2	
AUR	14,508	13.06	5	▲5	
ADU	7,505	6.75	0	Steady	
Others	9,455	8.49	-		
Total	111,047	100%	30		
Turnout	52.86%▲				
Elected County Council
Source: Autoritatea Electorală Permanentă (AEP)

=== Iași ===
- Political party of the elected County Council President

County Council Election					Mayoral Election
Party	Votes	%	Seats	▲▼	Map
PNL	109,523	34.72	14	▼3	
PSD	87,604	27.77	11	▲1	
ADU	44,678	14.16	6 (Note: Iași: USR-3, PMP-2, FD-1)	▼3	
AUR	35,760	11.33	5	▲5	
Others	37,876	11.98	-		
Total	315,441	100%	36		
Turnout	40.85%▲				
Elected County Council
Source: Autoritatea Electorală Permanentă (AEP)

=== Ilfov ===
- Political party of the elected County Council President

County Council Election					Mayoral Election
Party	Votes	%	Seats	▲▼	Map
PSD-PNL	127,816	57.68%	22 (Note: Ilfov: PNL-14, PSD-8)	▲1	
ADU	41,158	18.57%	7 (Note: Ilfov: USR-4, FD-2, PMP-1)	Steady	
AUR	29,309	13.22%	5	▲5	
Others	23,295	10.48%	-		
Total	221,578	100%	34 ▲2		
Turnout	54.10%▲				
Elected County Council
Source: Autoritatea Electorală Permanentă (AEP)

=== Sibiu ===
- Political party of the elected County Council President

County Council Election
Party	Votes	%	Seats	▲▼
PNL	49,076	28%	10	▼8
PSD	37,101	21.17%	8	▲3
FDGR	23,053	13.15%	5	0
ADU	21,787	12.43%	5	▲1
AUR	21,633	12.34%	4	new
Others	22,625	12.91%	-	
Total	175,275	100%	32	
Turnout	47.92%▲			
Source: Autoritatea Electorală Permanentă (AEP)

=== Timiș ===
- Political party of the elected County Council President

County Council Election					Mayoral Election
Party	Votes	%	Seats	▲▼	Map
PSD-PNL	130,925	44.61%	20 (Note: Timiș: PNL-10, PSD-10)	▼3	
ADU	75,848	25.84%	11 (Note: Timiș: USR-5, FD-5, PMP-1)	Steady	
AUR	34,011	11.59%	5	▲5	
Others	52,722	17.96%	-		
Total	293.506	100%	36		
Turnout	48.24%▲				
Elected County Council
Source: Autoritatea Electorală Permanentă (AEP)

== Current distribution of administrative mandates at local political level in Romania ==
In the table below are statistically represented the vast majority of the administrative mandates won nationwide in Romania by the following 12 political parties (both major and minor) after the 2020 Romanian local elections (based on their total number of elected representatives) as well as their current distribution of administrative mandates previously won in Romania in 2020 at local political level, according to the 4 main categories as follows (statistics correct as of late October 2023):

Political party		Political position	Main Ideology	Leader(s)	County Council (CJ) Presidents	Mayors	County Council Councillors	Local Council Councillors
PSD	Social Democratic Party	Centre to centre-left	Social democracy Social conservatism	Marcel Ciolacu	20 / 41	1,360 / 3,176	362 / 1,340	13,820 / 39,900
PNL (Note: PNL had entirely absorbed ALDE during late March 2022, therefore the figures associated here with PNL include seats previously won by ALDE in 2020 as well. In addition, the figures here also include a party-switching mayor from AUR who subsequently joined the party in June 2022.)	National Liberal Party	Centre-right	Social conservatism	Nicolae Ciucă	17 / 41	1,249 / 3,176	489 / 1,340	15,043 / 39,900
UDMR; RMDSZ	Democratic Alliance of Hungarians in Romania	Centre-right	Hungarian minority rights	Hunor Kelemen	4 / 41	199 / 3,176	94 / 1,340	2,360 / 39,900
PMP	People's Movement Party	Centre-right to right-wing	Christian democracy National conservatism	Cristian Diaconescu	0 / 41	50 / 3,176	67 / 1,340	2,137 / 39,900
USR	Save Romania Union	Centre to centre-right	Populism	Cătălin Drulă	0 / 41	41 / 3,176	108 / 1,340	1,655 / 39,900
PRO	PRO Romania	Centre-left	Social democracy Progressivism	Victor Ponta	0 / 41	36 / 3,176	56 / 1,340	1,885 / 39,900
PER	Romanian Ecologist Party	Right-wing	Green conservatism Nationalism	Florin Secara	0 / 41	7 / 3,176	5 / 1,340	372 / 39,900
PUSL	Social Liberal Humanist Party	Centre		Daniel Ionașcu	0 / 41	2 / 3,176	0 / 1,340	166 / 39,900
PV	Green Party	Centre to left-wing	Green politics	Marius Lazăr/Lavinia Cosma	0 / 41	1 / 3,176	0 / 1,340	117 / 39,900
AUR	Alliance for the Union of Romanians	Right-wing to far-right	Right-wing populism	George Simion	0 / 41	2 / 3,176 (Note: AUR lost one of its three mayors in June 2022. The respective mayor was from Vrancea County and switched, at that time, to PNL.)	0 / 1,340	79 / 39,900
FDGR; DFDR	Democratic Forum of Germans in Romania		German minority rights	Paul-Jürgen Porr	0 / 41	5 / 3,176	5 / 1,340	68 / 39,900
PNȚCD	Christian Democratic National Peasants' Party	Centre-right to right-wing	Right-wing populism	Aurelian Pavelescu	0 / 41	1 / 3,176	0 / 1,340	42 / 39,900

== Opinion polls ==
see more Opinion polls for local elections in Romania, 2024

=== National results in 2020 ===
In the table below are highlighted the major electoral scores (or results) obtained by the 6 largest political parties in Romania at the previous local elections which here held in September 2020:

Date	Results	Electorate	PNL	PSD	USR	PMP	UDMR	PRO	Others	Lead
27 Sep 2020	2020 election	8,419,028	32.32%	23.16%	8.89%	6.04%	4.87%	4.68%	20.04%	9.16%

=== National polling ===
In the table below are represented the prospective results of the 6 main political parties active in Romania at local political level for the forthcoming local elections which are going to be held in 2024:

Date	Sample size	Source	PNL	PSD	USR	PMP	UDMR	PRO	PER/ PV	Others	Lead
20 - 25 May 2024	1,100	INSCOP	27.6% ▲	29.0% ▼	12.7% ▼		4.8% ▲	1.5% ▼	3.0% ▲	6.8% ▼	1.4%
6–19 Oct 2022	—N/a	CURS	22.0% ▼	31.0% ▲	11.0% ▲	4.0% ▼	—N/a	4.0% ▼	—N/a	14.0% ▼	9.0%

== Regional polls ==
see more Opinion polls for local elections in Romania, 2024

=== Bucharest ===
Date	Poll source	PSD	ADU			PNL	AUR	PER/PV	PRO	PUSL	ApP	SOS	Others	Lead
9-23 Feb 2024	CURS	34.0	23.0			16.0	13.0			5.0		6.0	3.0	11.0
Sep 2022	Avangarde	34.0	12.0	3.0		25.0	13.0	1.0	3.0	1.0	1.0		7.0	9.0
Aug 2022	CURS	32.0	10.0	4.0		23.0	12.0	3.0	2.0	4.0	3.0		6.0	9.0
Jun 2022	CURS	33.0	10.0	5.0		22.0	14.0	1.0	2.0	4.0	2.0		7.0	11.0
14–20 Jan 2022	CURS	34.0	17.0	6.0		17.0	13.0	—N/a	2.0	5.0	2.0		4.0	17.0
17–23 Sep 2021	CURS	33.0	23.0	4.0		21.0	8.0	—N/a	3.0	4.0	—N/a	—N/a	10.0	
Jul 2021	CURS	32.0	25.0	4.0		22.0	8.0	—N/a	2.0	4.0	—N/a	—N/a	7.0	
May 2021	CURS	29.0	27.0	4.0		22.0	9.0	—N/a	3.0	4.0	—N/a		2.0	2.0
Mar 2021	CURS	32.0	27.0	5.0		20.0	7.0	—N/a	2.0	4.0	—N/a		3.0	5.0
26 Sep 2020	Election	32.38	26.98	7.82	-	22.24	0.88	1.81	1.72	0.95	—N/a		6.3	5.0

==== Seats projection ====
Date	PSD	USR	PNL	PMP	AUR	PV	PUSL	ApP
Sep 2022	25	8	14	—	8	—	—	—
Jul 2022	26	8	12	—	6	—	—	3
Jun 2022	25	9	11	—	6	—	—	4
Jun 2022	23	7	15	—	10	—	—	—
May 2022	23	11	9	—	5	—	3	4
Mar 2022	25	13	10	—	7	—	—	—
Jan 2022	20	10	10	4	7	—	3	—
Jan 2022	21	15	8	—	11	—	—	—
2021	21	14	10	4	6	—	—	—
Jul 2021	20	16	14	—	5	—	—	—
May 2021	18	17	14	—	6	—	—	—
Mar 2021	20	16	12	3	4	—	—	—
26 Sep 2020	21	17	12	5	0	0	0	—N/a

=== Mayor of Bucharest ===
Data	Source	Dan (Note: Supported by the ADU and REPER)	Cîrstoiu	Firea	Voiculescu	Ciucu	Burduja	Băsescu	Târziu	Enache	Șoșoacă	Piedone	Others	Lead
1-5 June 2024	AtlasIntel	45.2%	—N/a	21.7%	—N/a	—N/a	7.8%	—N/a	—N/a	5.7%	3.4%	15.4%	0.8%	23.5%
2-9 April 2024	CURS	27%	23%	—N/a	—N/a	—N/a	—N/a	—N/a	—N/a	5%	2%	38%	5%	11%
9–13 April 2024	Sociopol	43%	8%	—N/a	—N/a	—N/a	—N/a	—N/a	—N/a	5%	—N/a	41%	—N/a (Note: Alexandru Pânișoară (PER: 3%)	2%
5–8 April 2024	AtlasIntel	37.1%	17.4%	—N/a	—N/a	—N/a	—N/a	—N/a	—N/a	4.9%	—N/a	30%	10.6	7.1%
5–8 April 2024	AtlasIntel	35.4%	16.4%	—N/a	—N/a	—N/a	—N/a	—N/a	—N/a	—N/a (Note: In this scenario, Cozmin Gușă runs as an independent candidate with AUR support and receives 5.8%)	—N/a	30.7%	11.5%	4.7%
29 March–2 April 2024	INSOMAR	29%	15%	—N/a	—N/a	—N/a	—N/a	—N/a	—N/a	—N/a	—N/a	22%	34% (Note: Cozmin Gușă (IND): 26%)	3%
26 March–2 April 2024	CURS	29%	20%	—N/a	—N/a	—N/a	—N/a	—N/a	—N/a	4%	4%	40%	—N/a	11%
21–24 March 2024	Sociopol	34.0%	26.0%	—N/a	—N/a	—N/a	—N/a	—N/a	—N/a	6.0%	4.0%	30.0%	—N/a	4.0%
20–24 March 2024	Avangarde	41.0%	29.0%	—N/a	—N/a	—N/a	—N/a	—N/a	—N/a	27.0%	—N/a	—N/a	3.0%	12.0%
20–24 March 2024	Avangarde	30.0%	16.0%	—N/a	—N/a	—N/a	—N/a	—N/a	—N/a	10.0%	—N/a	42.0%	2.0%	12.0%
2–9 March 2024	Verifield	39.3%	—N/a	—N/a	—N/a	—N/a	16.0%	—N/a	—N/a	1.0%	2.4%	40.4%	0.9%	1.1%
9–23 February 2024	CURS	36.0%	—N/a	33.0%	—N/a	—N/a	—N/a	—N/a	—N/a	8.0%	5.0%	10.0%	8.0%	3.0%
7–14 September 2022	Avangarde	18.0%	—N/a	30.0%	14.0%	18.0%	4.0%	—N/a	—N/a (Note: George Simion, the leader of AUR, has 12% in this poll)	—N/a	—N/a	—N/a	4.0%	12.0%
27 September 2020	2020 elections	42.81%	—N/a	37.97%	—N/a	—N/a	—N/a	10.99%	0.67%	—N/a	—N/a	—N/a	7.56%	4.84%

== Aftermath ==
=== Allegations of electoral fraud ===
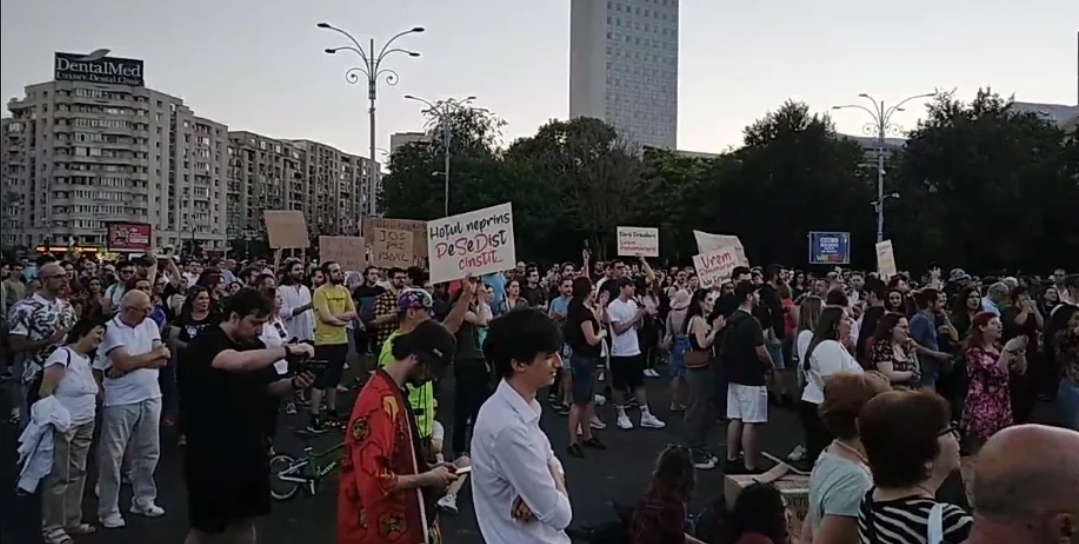
Protest in Bucharest, on June 15

After the announcement of the provisional results, Clotilde Armand and Radu Mihaiu, the Save Romania Union mayors from Sector 1 and Sector 2 of Bucharest, who lost the elections to the PSD-PNL candidates, announced that there had been cases of pre-stamped votes or incorrect counting. They demanded that the election be cancelled and redone, declaring it the biggest electoral fraud in Romanian history since the 1946 Romanian general election.

Since 13 June, hundreds of USR supporters have started to organize protests in Bucharest daily, demanding a recount of votes or new elections, as well as the resignation of the Social Democrat Toni Greblă from the position of Director of the Permanent Electoral Authority. However, Social Democrat Prime Minister Marcel Ciolacu stated that Greblă shouldn't be dismissed, declaring that "I know it is hard (for USR) to lose, but they must show dignity".
