= Pentru Voi =

Fundatia Pentru Voi (Pentru Voi Foundation) from Timișoara, Romania was established in 1995 as a Foundation for supporting people with intellectual disabilities.

It is now considered a model of good-practice for Central and Eastern Europe.

This foundation collaborates with Timișoara's city hall. Its mission is to respect humans rights with mental disabilities. Its philosophy is that everyone is equal, everyone should be respected and everyone should have equal chances in life. Its goal is to make a better life and to increase the life quality of people with mental disabilities. In this foundation are about 150 adult persons with mental disabilities.

In 2008 Pentru Voi project "Different but Together" received Romanian top award at the civil Society Gala. It is the first time the award goes to an organisation from Timișoara, and also the first time when it is won by an organization for people with intellectual disabilities.

From 16 February to 24 March 2009 the "Pentru voi" foundation held the contest "Left is Right" with the purpose of introducing the matter of adult persons with autism to the young audience from Timișoara. The theme was "A young person with autism a colleague of mine?", the participants being able to express their point of view in writing (essay or poetry) or graphic works(drawing, painting or photography).

On 10 March 2009 the project "A friend for you" of the foundation won the award for the best public voluntary campaign at the Gala People for People (Oameni pentru oameni). The project was about the friendship between mentor (volunteer)and the disciple (an intellectually disabled person) and it gave 35 intellectually disabled people a new perspective of life, they discovered new things, met new people, and gain a friend that helped them feel more accepted and appreciated.

== Workshops ==
- Printing and copying workshop, mostly for brochures and magazines
- Tailoring workshop
- Packaging workshop
- Administrative workshop
- Gardening
- Bakery

== Recent projects ==
- 10000 croissants Pentru Voi
- Redirect 2% Pentru Voi
- Left is right creation contest: A young with autism, colleague with me?
- International conference >> It's time for change
- A friend for you
- "Pentru Voi" Foundation won the award "Chinese drop"
