= Dan Barna =

Romanian politician

Dan Barna MEP
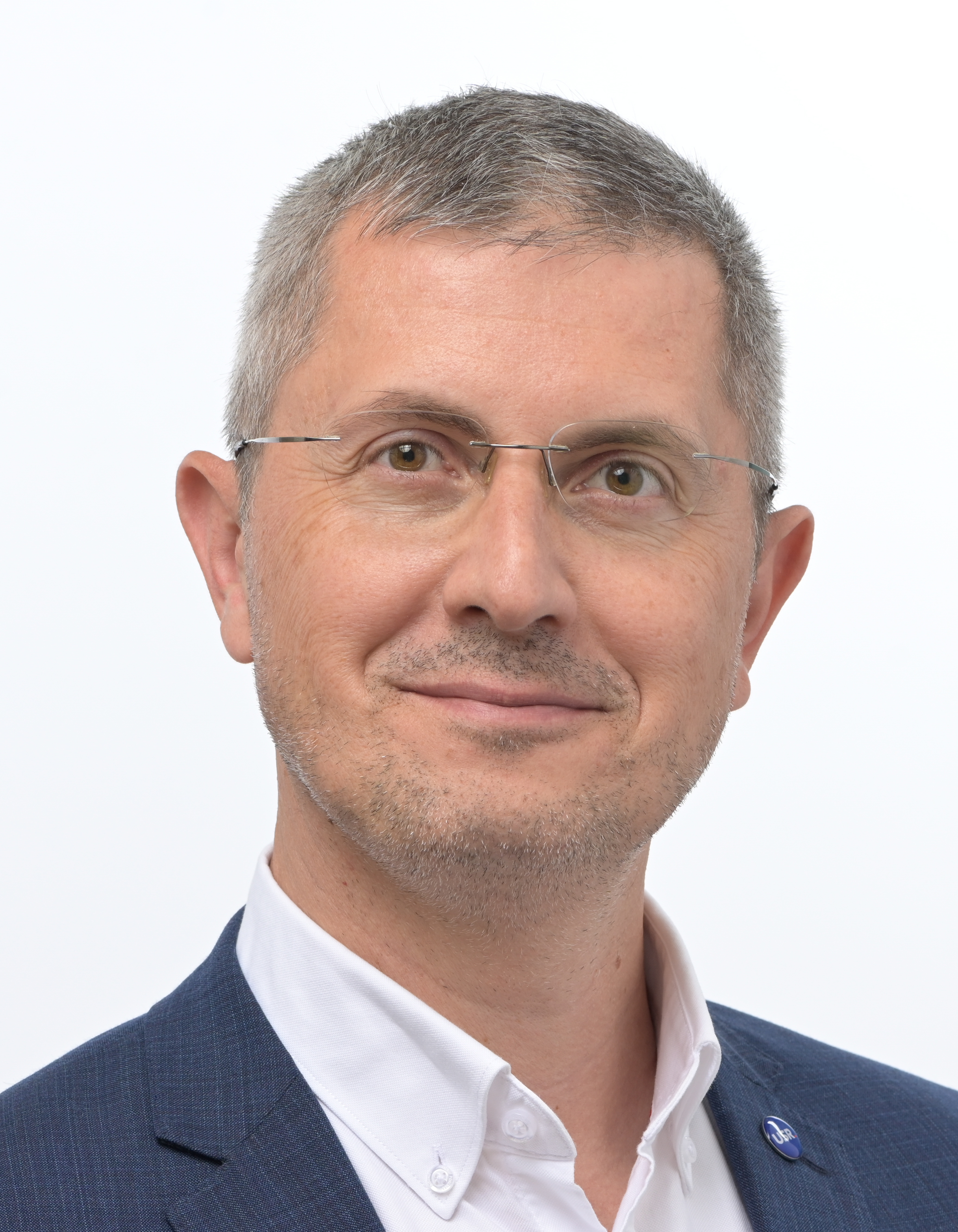
- Official portrait, 2024

Deputy Prime Minister of Romania
- In office 23 December 2020 – 6 September 2021 Serving with Kelemen Hunor
- President: Klaus Iohannis
- Prime Minister: Florin Cîțu
- Preceded by: Raluca Turcan
- Succeeded by: Kelemen Hunor

President of the Save Romania Union
- In office 28 October 2017 – 1 October 2021
- Preceded by: Elek Levente (acting)
- Succeeded by: Dacian Cioloș

Member of the European Parliament
- Incumbent
- Assumed office 16 July 2024
- Constituency: Romania

Member of the Chamber of Deputies
- In office 21 December 2016 – 15 July 2024
- Constituency: Sibiu County

Personal details
- Born: Ilie Dan Barna; 10 July 1975 (age 51) Sibiu, Sibiu County, Romania
- Party: USR (2016–present)
- Spouse: Olguța Dana Totolici
- Children: 1
- Education: University of Bucharest; Politehnica University of Bucharest
- Profession: Lawyer

Dan Barna (Romanian pronunciation: [dan ˈbarna]; born 10 July 1975) is a Romanian politician and lawyer. He served as the president of the Save Romania Union (USR), and as co-president of USR-PLUS until 1 October 2021. He was elected a member of the Chamber of Deputies in 2016.

== Biography ==
Barna was born in Sibiu, Sibiu County, Socialist Republic of Romania on 10 July 1975. He graduated from the law school at the University of Bucharest in 1998 and obtained a master's degree in project management from Politehnica University of Bucharest in 2003. After working as a lawyer, he completed a course financed by the European Commission, and became a consultant for EU funds. A consultancy company he founded with a colleague led him to implement a number of projects financed from the European Social Fund. According to a media investigation, he was allegedly involved in a financial scheme during his entrepreneurship time, allegations which he rejected.

In May 2016, he began working for the then Prime Minister of Romania Dacian Cioloș as Secretary of State with the Ministry of European Funds. He then joined the Save Romania Union (USR), a centre-right political party, where he was elected a deputy in Romania's parliament in December 2016, and president of the party in October 2017.

=== 2019 presidential election ===
Barna announced his intention to run in the 2019 Romanian presidential election on 1 July 2019. His candidacy attracted controversy due to him not complying with the legal requirements regarding the mention of a candidate's first-degree relatives income, in the public declaration of assets (document required in a candidate's file, while registering at the electoral board). He stated that his wife's income - who was at the time employed at Petrom - was "classified". Soon after the story sparked, he declassified his wife's annual income and changed his assets statement.

Barna campaigned on a platform of constitutional reform, saying "Romania needs a full-time president, that is, a non-stop president, who does not go away." His running-mate was Dacian Cioloș, who would have become Prime Minister if they had won the parliamentary elections the following year.

Dan Barna (center) join protesters and speak to the press outside the Parliament building, rejecting the changes to the justice laws operated by the ruling coalition in December 2017

His election strategy was to convince the electorate to vote for him to hinder the PSD candidate, Viorica Dăncilă, from entering the second round of voting. Barna did not receive enough votes to enter the second round and subsequently endorsed Klaus Iohannis, who was re-elected for a second and last term.

== Positions ==
Barna has said "Gay marriage is not yet a subject for the public agenda, there is no initiative promoting same-sex marriage. Maybe in 20, 30 years next generations will take care of this problem, but for now, this is not a priority."

== Electoral history ==
=== Presidential elections ===
Election	Affiliation	First round			Second round		
Election	Affiliation	Votes	Percentage	Position	Votes	Percentage	Position
2019	2020 USR-PLUS Alliance (Note: The 2020 USR-PLUS Alliance members were the Save Romania Union and the Freedom, Unity and Solidarity Party.)	1,384,450	15.02%	3rd	not qualified		
