= Dacian Cioloș =

Romanian politician

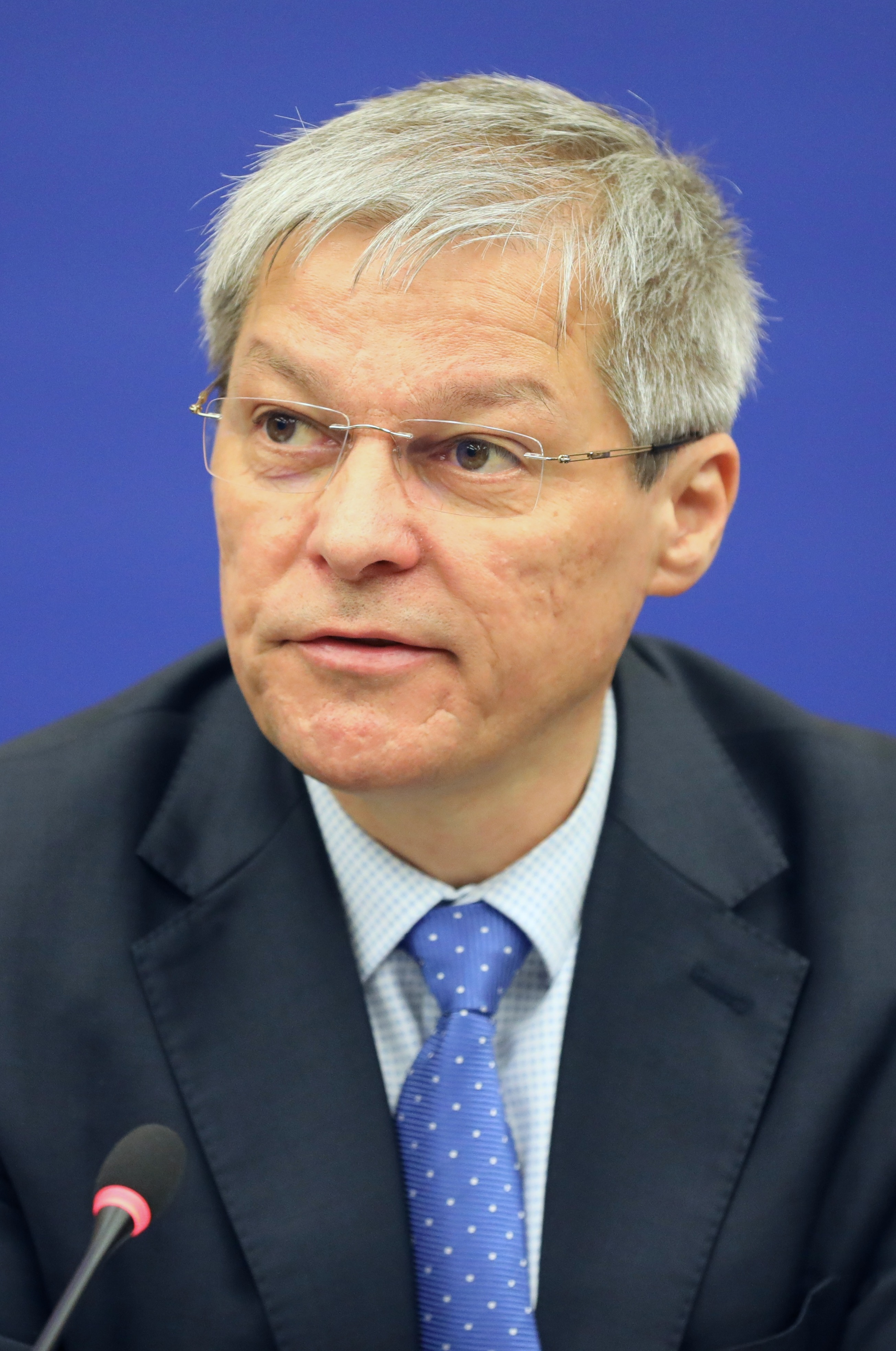
- Cioloș in 2020

Prime Minister of Romania
- In office 17 November 2015 – 4 January 2017
- President: Klaus Iohannis
- Preceded by: Sorin Cîmpeanu (Acting)
- Succeeded by: Sorin Grindeanu

President of USR
- In office 1 October 2021 – 7 February 2022
- Preceded by: Dan Barna (USR); Himself (PLUS)
- Succeeded by: Cătălin Drulă (Acting)

Member of the European Parliament for Romania
- In office 2 July 2019 – 15 July 2024

Leader of Renew Europe
- In office 2 July 2019 – 19 October 2021
- Preceded by: Guy Verhofstadt (Alliance of Liberals and Democrats for Europe)
- Succeeded by: Stéphane Séjourné

President of PLUS
- In office 26 January 2019 – 1 October 2021
- Preceded by: Position established
- Succeeded by: Himself (party merged with USR)

European Commissioner for Agriculture and Rural Development
- In office 9 February 2010 – 1 November 2014
- President: José Manuel Barroso
- Preceded by: Mariann Fischer Boel
- Succeeded by: Phil Hogan

Minister of Agriculture and Rural Development
- In office 5 August 2007 – 22 December 2008
- Prime Minister: Călin Popescu-Tăriceanu
- Preceded by: Decebal Traian Remeș
- Succeeded by: Ilie Sârbu

Personal details
- Born: 27 July 1969 (age 57) Zalău, Romania
- Party: Independent (before 2018); PLUS (2018–2021); USR (2021–2022); REPER (2022–present)
- Other political affiliations: EPP (2016–2019); ALDE (2019–present)
- Spouse: Valérie Villemin (m. 2000)
- Education: University of Agricultural Sciences and Veterinary Medicine; National Graduate School of Agriculture, Rennes; University of Montpellier 1

Dacian Julien Cioloș (Note: Romanian pronunciation: [dat͡ʃiˈan ʒuliˈen ˈt͡ʃoloʃ]) (born 27 July 1969) is a Romanian agronomist who served as Prime Minister of Romania from November 2015 to January 2017. He previously served as Agriculture Minister under Călin Popescu-Tăriceanu between October 2007 and December 2008. In November 2009, European Commission President José Manuel Barroso nominated him to be the next Agriculture Commissioner, a position he assumed in February 2010 and held until his term expired in November 2014. In November 2015, President Klaus Iohannis named him prime minister; Cioloș assumed office after receiving approval from Parliament.

He remained until after the 2016 parliamentary election, which was lost by the parties that called for Cioloș to continue his term. Cioloș is the founder of the Freedom, Unity and Solidarity Party (PLUS) within the larger former political construction USR PLUS (2019–2021). Between October 2021 and February 2022, he led the Save Romania Union (USR), into which the party he founded was merged. In May 2019, he was elected a Member of the European Parliament (MEP), subsequently becoming leader of the new Renew Europe political group. He relinquished the leadership upon becoming USR president.

In October 2021, following the ousting of Prime Minister Florin Cîțu through a motion of no-confidence, President Iohannis nominated Cioloș as Prime Minister-designate but the Parliament rejected the proposal. The following year in May, he quit USR and launched a new party, REPER.

== Biography ==
=== Background and government career ===
He was born in Zalău in 1969, but spent much of his childhood with his grandparents in nearby Pericei village, where he developed an interest in farming. After graduating from the agricultural high school in Șimleu Silvaniei in 1987, he attended the Faculty of Horticulture at the University of Agricultural Sciences and Veterinary Medicine of Cluj-Napoca, earning a horticultural engineer's degree in 1994.

While a student, Cioloș belonged to the Romanian Hearth Union’s youth wing; he states that his activities there were of a cultural nature, and had nothing to do with the party's extreme nationalist stance. He also holds degrees in the economy of agricultural development from the École nationale supérieure agronomique de Rennes and from the University of Montpellier 1, where he respectively earned a master's in 1997 and a doctorate in 2006. He has belonged to the agricultural think tank Groupe de Bruges since 2000. Although in Romania Cioloș was a political independent, he was affiliated with the European People's Party (EPP) at the European level.

From 1991 to 1996, Cioloș completed thirteen months' worth of internships on organic farms in the French region of Brittany. In the summer of 1995, he prepared a rural development project between Savoie and Argeș County, while working at the Aveyron agricultural chamber of commerce in Rodez during 1997, studying agricultural and rural development in the northern part of that department. In 1997 and 1999, he interned as an agro-economist at the European Commission's Directorate-General for Agriculture and Rural Development in Brussels, helping prepare the Special Accession Programme for Agriculture and Rural Development (SAPARD). In 1998–1999, he directed a local rural development programme in Argeș County, again cooperating with Savoie.

From 1999 to 2001, he worked at two agricultural development agencies in France, coordinating joint programmes with Romania in that field. From 2002 to 2003, as part of the European Commission's delegation to Romania, he helped manage SAPARD's implementation in his native country. From January 2005 to May 2007, he was an adviser to Romania's Agriculture Minister, and a representative in the Council of the European Union's Special Committee on Agriculture. From May to October 2007, he was undersecretary of state for European affairs at the ministry. Following the resignation of Decebal Traian Remeș due to a corruption scandal, he was appointed Agriculture Minister in October 2007, serving until the following December, when Tăriceanu's National Liberal Party-led government left office after a parliamentary election.

Early in 2009, he returned to work at the Agriculture and Rural Development DG, and that July, President Traian Băsescu named him to head a one-year commission looking at public agricultural development policies.

=== Nomination and term as EU Commissioner for Agriculture ===
In October 2009, the Emil Boc government, hoping to secure the Agriculture portfolio in the second Barroso Commission, nominated Cioloș as Romania's EU Commissioner. The proposal was criticised by the opposition National Liberals (PNL) and Social Democrats (PSD), who saw it as a last-ditch maneuver by a government on the brink of collapse, as well as by the Party of European Socialists, who believed that the position ought to have gone to a Social Democrat. Boc's cabinet did indeed collapse the day after nominating Cioloș, when it lost a motion of no confidence.

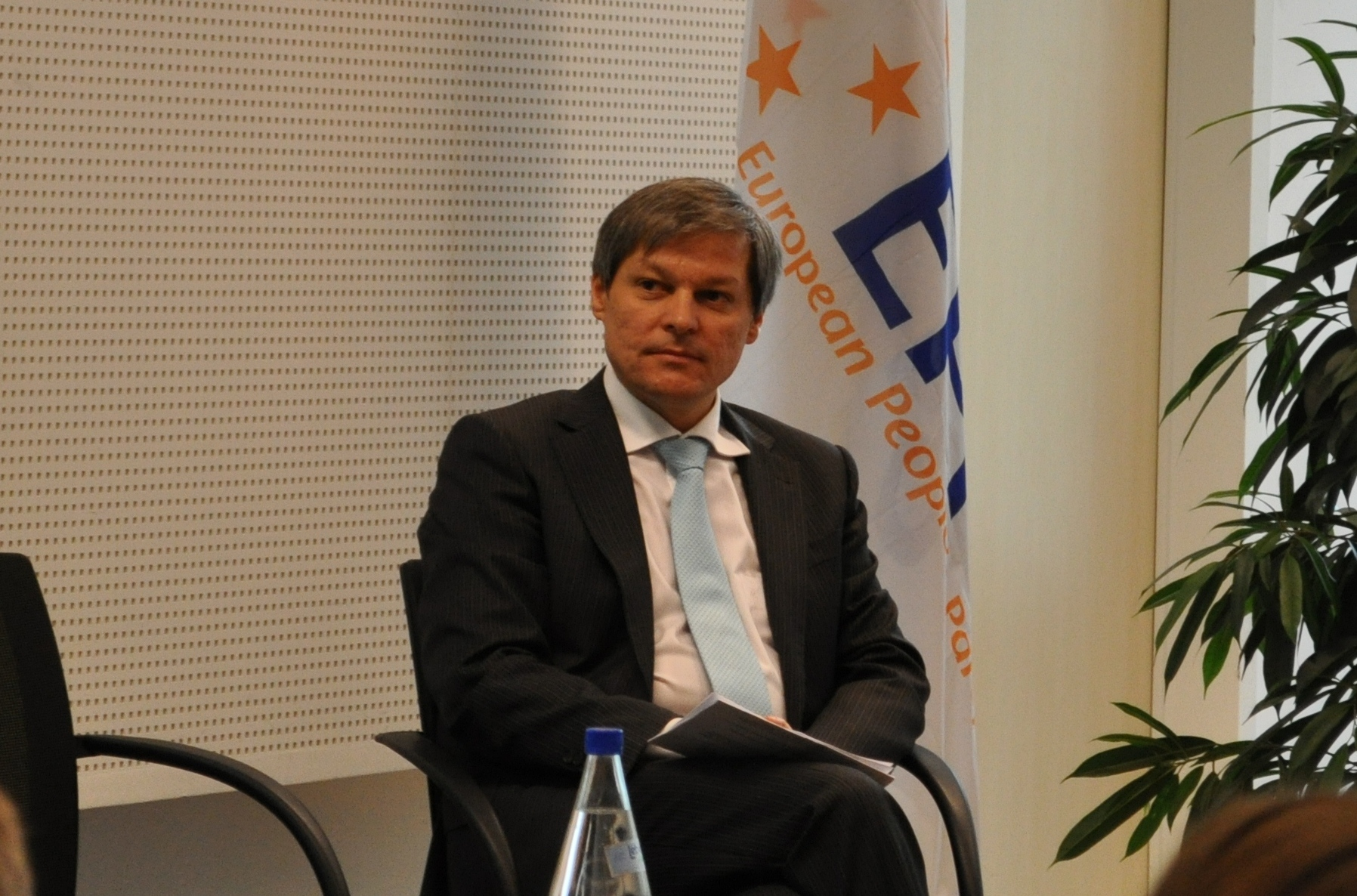
Cioloș in September 2010 as Commissioner for Agriculture

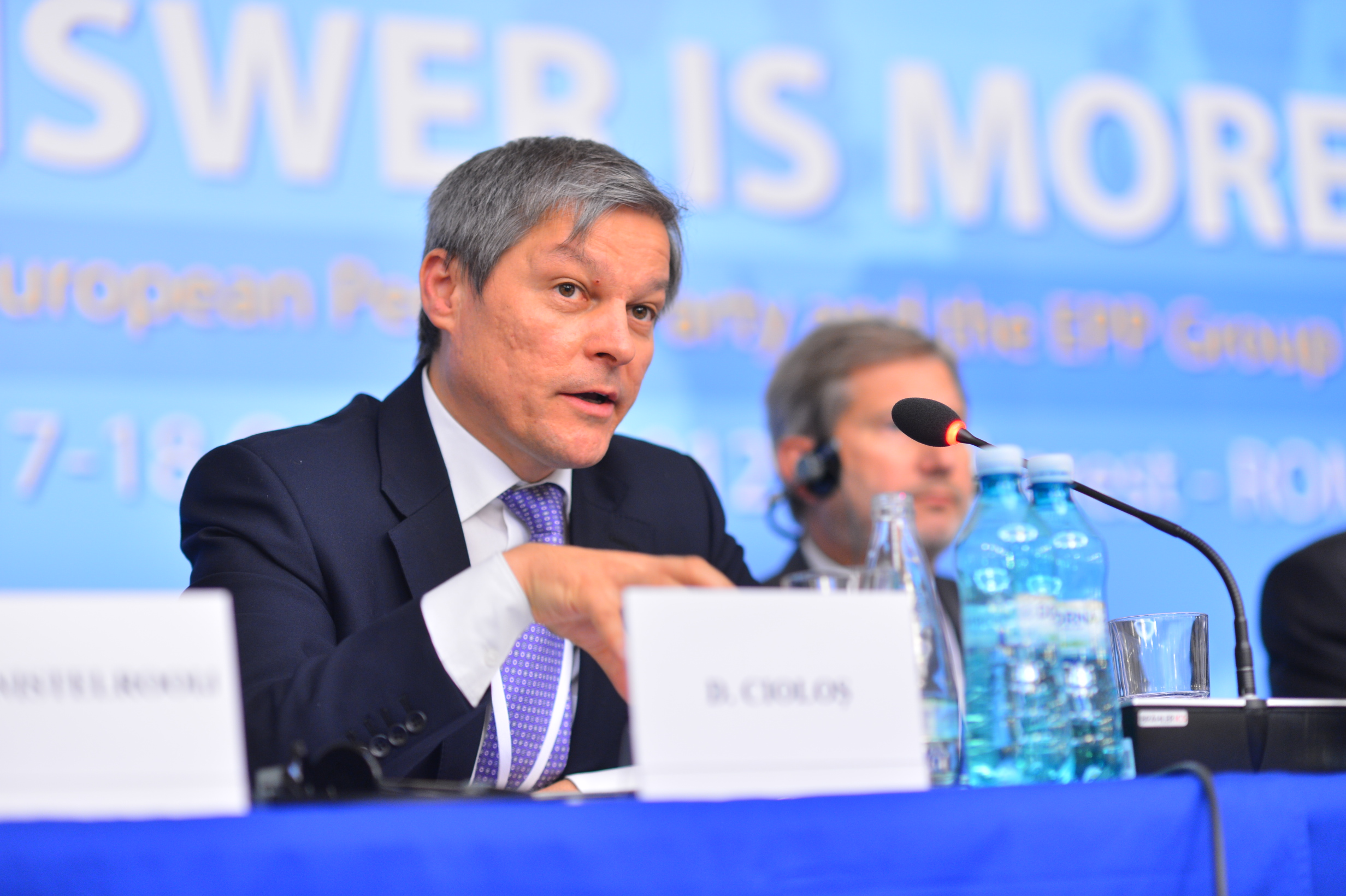
Cioloș at the October 2012 EPP Congress

At the end of November, Barroso nominated Cioloș to the Agriculture position, observing that he was the "most competent" of those submitted for consideration, and lauding his "modern vision" of agriculture and rural development. The British magazine Farmers Weekly considered the nomination "a controversial choice", citing recent mismanagement by Romania of EU funds, but also acknowledged his "broad agricultural experience". National Farmers' Union of England and Wales as well as Scotland's NFU welcomed the appointment. Italian Minister of Agriculture Luca Zaia and French President Nicolas Sarkozy likewise congratulated Cioloș. German news agency Deutsche Presse-Agentur and British newspaper The Independent both criticised the nomination due to the funds mismanagement issue, with French daily Ouest-France alleging that the cause of British indignation was the perception that Cioloș would be akin to a second French EU Commissioner, given his close ties to that country.

After winning approval from the European Parliament in February 2010, Cioloș set forth his priority: maintaining a "thriving agricultural sector" in order to ensure food security, environmental preservation and protection of the countryside, help combat global warming and maintain a "fair standard of living" for farmers. As part of this objective, he promised to continue adapting and restructuring the Common Agricultural Policy.

In July 2015, Barroso's successor Jean-Claude Juncker named Cioloș as his special adviser on international food security.

=== As Prime Minister ===
In November 2015, Prime Minister Victor Ponta resigned following protests sparked by a deadly nightclub fire, and President Klaus Iohannis appointed Cioloș as his successor. The latter proposed a technocratic cabinet composed of twenty-one members, a third of them women. The cabinet won approval from Parliament on a 389–115 vote: the main Social Democrats (PSD) and National Liberals (PNL) were both in favour, although a number of legislators from the former party defied the leadership to vote against the cabinet. Additionally, the Alliance of Liberals and Democrats (ALDE) was opposed. He considers his two main achievements while in office to have been an increase in transparency, including the online release of salaries and expenditures for public institutions and financing contracts; and a reduction in bureaucracy that involved the elimination of numerous formalities. Ahead of the 2016 parliamentary election, Cioloș received the endorsement on behalf of the National Liberals (PNL) and of the Save Romania Union (USR), in turn urging voters to back either party. When these parties lost the election, the prime minister expressed his regret; the following month, he was succeeded by Sorin Grindeanu.

=== Return to politics ===
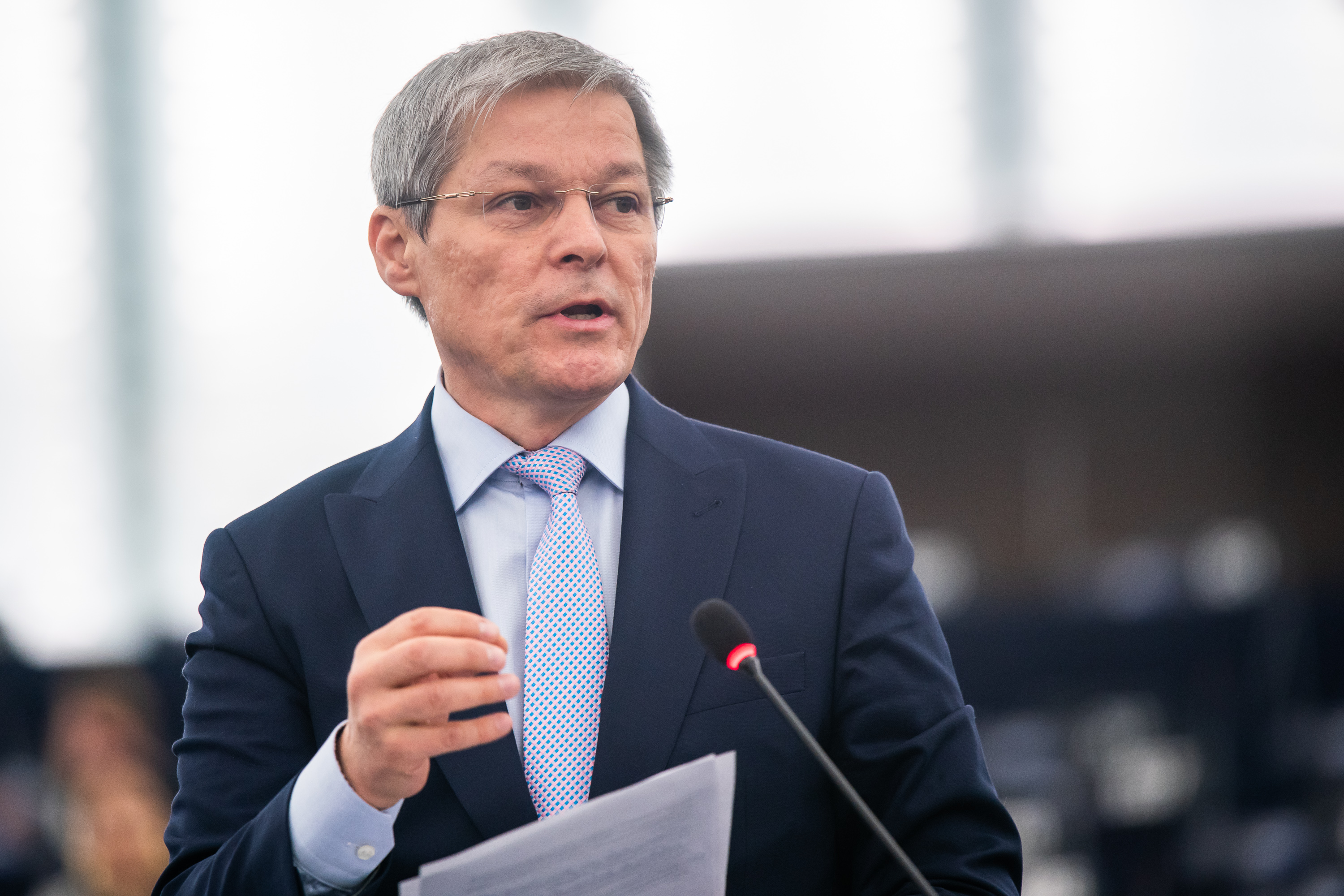
Cioloș speaking in the European Parliament in 2020

In March 2018, Cioloș announced the creation of a new political party, the Romania Together Movement.

Because the legal registration of the new political party took too long, Cioloș announced on 15 December 2018 the existence of a new party, already registered by some anonymous collaborators, called the Freedom, Unity and Solidarity Party (Romanian: Partidul Libertății, Unității și Solidarității, PLUS), thus dropping the former political project.

In January 2019, at the first national convention of PLUS, Cioloș was elected president of the newly emerged political party with 99.17% of the votes. The following month, Cioloș announced the establishment of the 2020 USR-PLUS Alliance between PLUS and the Dan Barna-led Save Romania Union (USR). That May, he was elected a Member of the European Parliament. He subsequently became leader of the new Renew Europe political group, having secured support from En Marche, Ciudadanos and parties from Germany and the Netherlands. He left that post in autumn 2021 in order to focus on domestic politics.

In October 2021, following the merger of USR with PLUS, Cioloș was elected the first president of the unified party, defeating Barna on a 50.9 to 49.1 margin. Later that month, following the collapse of the Florin Cîțu government, Iohannis once again named Cioloș as prime minister. Cioloș and his proposed cabinet were voted down in Parliament, on a vote of 88–184. In February 2022, after his program was rejected by subordinates in the USR leadership, Cioloș resigned as party president. That May, he quit USR altogether, citing dissatisfaction with the new leadership, and launched a new party, Renewing Romania's European Project (REPER).

At the 2024 European Parliament election, REPER failed to secure the threshold, and Cioloș lost his seat. He subsequently announced his withdrawal from electoral politics.

== Personal life ==
In 2000, Cioloș married Valérie Villemin, a French agriculture expert he met while studying in France. The ceremony took place in his grandparents' village of Pericei. The couple have no children. He has a younger brother, Sorin. His father insisted on Dacian as a first name, while his French middle name comes from Julien Sorel, protagonist of The Red and the Black, a book that Cioloș's mother read while pregnant with him. Cioloș is a member of the Romanian Orthodox Church.

== See also ==
- Cioloș Cabinet

== Notes ==
Political offices
Preceded by Decebal Traian Remeș	Minister of Agriculture and Rural Development; 2007–2008	Succeeded by Ilie Sârbu
Preceded by Leonard Orban	Romanian European Commissioner; 2010–2014	Succeeded by Corina Crețu
Preceded by Mariann Fischer Boel	European Commissioner for Agriculture and Rural Development; 2010–2014	Succeeded by Phil Hogan
Preceded by Sorin Cîmpeanu; Acting	Prime Minister of Romania; 2015–2017	Succeeded by Sorin Grindeanu
Party political offices
New group	Leader of Renew Europe; 2019–2021	Succeeded by Stéphane Séjourné
