= Spiru Haret University =

University in Bucharest, Romania

Coordinates: 44.4332°N 26.1013°E

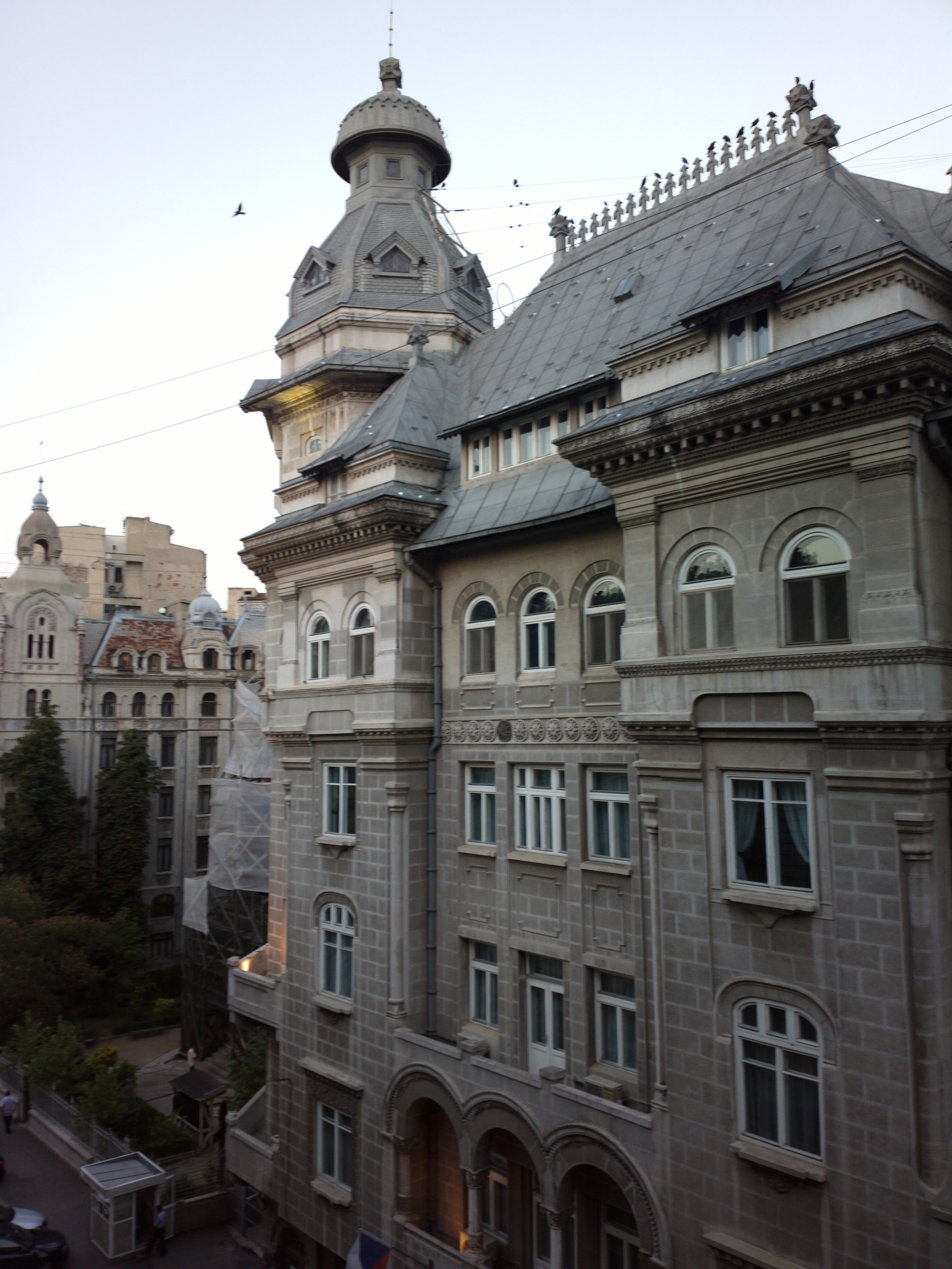
- Type: Private
- Established: 1991
- President: Aurelian Gh. Bondrea
- Location: Bucharest, Romania
- Website: www.spiruharet.ro

The Spiru Haret University is a private university in Bucharest, Romania, founded in 1991 by the president of Tomorrow's Romania Foundation, Aurelian Gh. Bondrea, as part of the teaching activities of this foundation. The university claims this has been done according to the model used by Harvard University. The university bears the name of a scientist and reformer of the Romanian education, Spiru Haret, who lived before World War I.

On February 14, 2000, the university was accredited by the National Council of Academic Evaluation and Accreditation of Higher Education Institutions. The establishment of the university was confirmed by Law no. 443 of July 5, 2002 and this law has not been abolished.

According to the data published by the university in July 2010, it has 30 faculties with 49 specializations and 64 master's degree curricula, being according to the newspaper Financiarul the largest university in Romania. In 2009 enrollment was reported as 311,928 students. Referring to the number of its students, the newspaper mistakenly called it the largest university in the world. It is the second-largest private university in the world, after Islamic Azad University (with 1.3 million students).

Pope John Paul II and a former Romanian president, Ion Iliescu, have received honorary doctorates from the university.

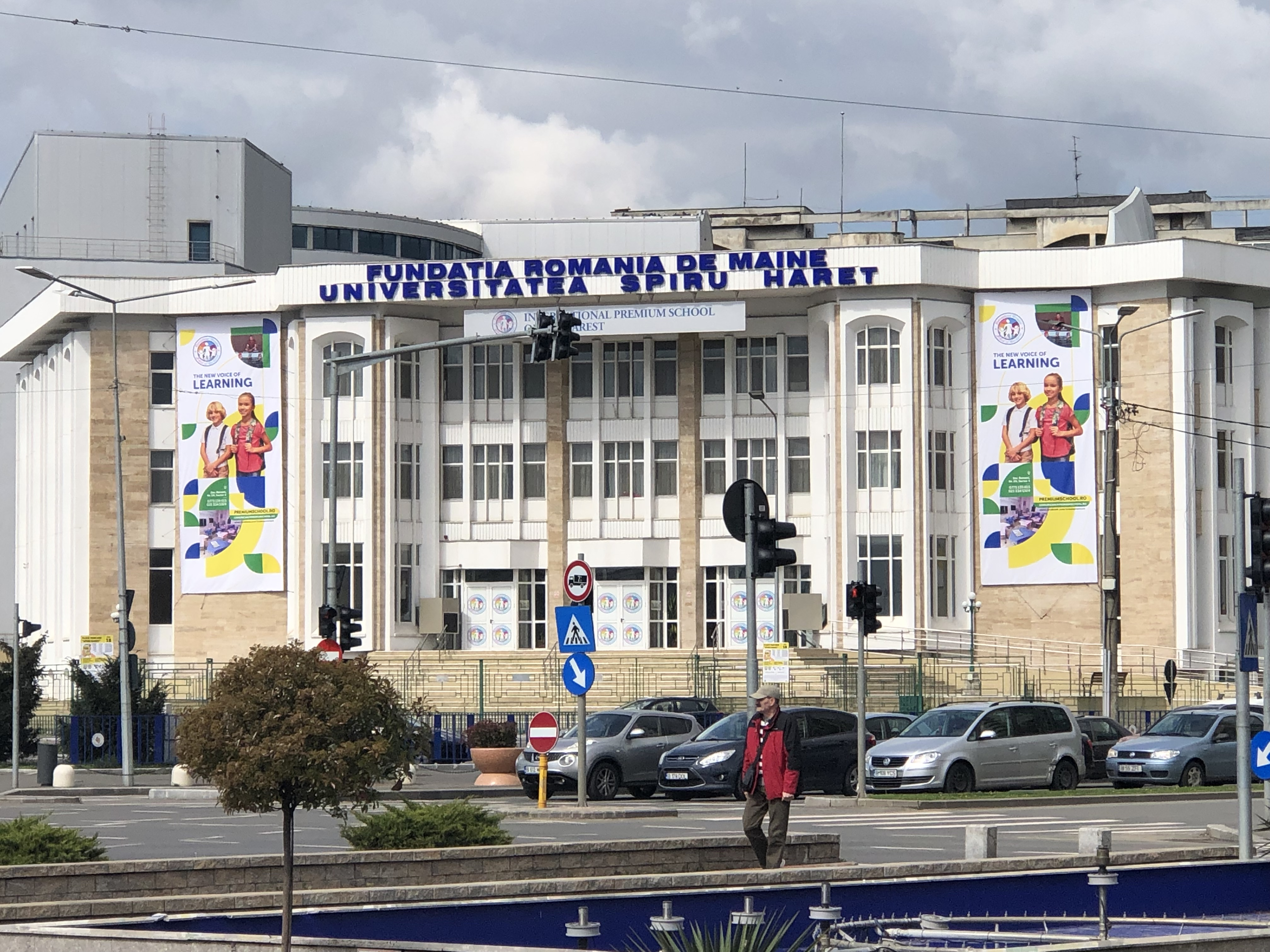
The Berceni campus

In 2011, the Spiru Haret University was officially evaluated as an "education-centered university", which is the third and lowest educational quality category of the Romanian universities. Education centered universities have lost the right of organizing doctorate degrees studies. In July 2017, Spiru Haret University ranked on the 27th place out of 103 other universities in Romania.

== Doctor Honoris Causa ==
Ding Chao (2012), Richard England (2010), Pope John Paul II (2003), Ion Iliescu (2002), Paul Feher (1999), Nicolae Mateescu-Matte (1997), Roland Drago (1995).

== Faculties and departments ==
- Architecture
- Arts
- Law and Public Administration
- Physical Education and Sport
- Finance and Banking
- Geography
- Journalism, Communication and Public Relations
- Letters
- Financial and Accounting Management
- Marketing and International Business
- Mathematics and Informatics
- Veterinary Medicine
- International Relations, History and Philosophy
- Sociology-Psychology (renamed Psychology and Educational Sciences)
- Department for Teachers' Training

== International cooperation ==
Spiru Haret University is a member of the following European and international organizations:

- Alliance of Central-Eastern European Universities (ACEU) – 2009
- European Association for ERASMUS Coordinators (EAEC) – 2011
- European Association of Career Guidance (EACG) – 2011
- Alliance of Universities for Democracy (AUDEM), Tennessee – 1993
- Magna Charta Universitatum, Bologna, Signatory party – 2005
- Magna Charta Observatory – 2005
- European University Association (EUA) – Associate Member – 2005
- Balkan Forum for Communication – Founding Member – 2005
- Agence Universitaire de la Francophonie (AUF) – 2006
- European Confederation of Language Centres in Higher Education (CercleS) – 2006
- European Association for Architectural Education (EAAE) – 2008
- International Association of Universities (IAU) – 2008

== Criticism (distance learning programs) ==
Although it received accreditation from Romania's National Council of Academic Evaluation in 2002, its accreditations were canceled for a large number of distance learning specializations. Also, there are some voices which dispute the level of the distance learning programs offered. The scandal peaked in the summer of 2009, when the way license diplomas are obtained scandalized the Minister of Education, who threatened with an inquiry of the Romanian public prosecutors.

A number of Romanian newspapers have called the distance learning department of Spiru Haret University "a diploma mill" (literally translated, "a diplomas factory"). This viewpoint has been confirmed by the Austrian Der Standard and by the Swiss Neue Zürcher Zeitung. The German Consulate in Romania (Timișoara) mentioned worries in respect to the legal situation of the university in its press review. The French journal Le Monde has confirmed the viewpoint of the quoted newspapers. Some English language sources (e.g. from the Romanian newspaper Evenimentul Zilei and Radio Romania International) express the same view. Therefore, the Spiru Haret University is increasingly considered in Romania and outside it as a diploma mill. Its lawyers seek to circumvent Romanian education laws, and this implied the consequence that new laws are discussed by the Romanian Department of Education, Research and Innovation, which may lead to the prohibition of all Spiru Haret's activities.

Spiru Haret University claims to be accredited by the European University Association (EUA) instead of the Romanian public agency ARACIS. However, the EUA does not accredit universities and its "evaluations are not related to accreditation or certification processes." This viewpoint is confirmed by an IEP report: "the Programme is neither linked to the allocation of funds nor to a control function on behalf of public authorities."

The Spiru Haret University has been prohibited to organize license (diploma) exams for a period of three years. During these three years, Spiru Haret University has been placed under the scrutiny of the Romanian Department of Education. According to Government Decision no. 749/2009, Civil Law Sentence no. 3326 has radiated the Spiru Haret University, at its own request, from the application of Government Decision no. 676/2007 regarding the license university study fields, the structures of higher education institutions and the disciplines organized by them, with the subsequent additions and from Government Decision no. 635/2008 regarding the structures of higher education and the specialization/curricula for university license studies organized by them, either accredited or temporarily authorized to operate, republished. The students enlisted at accredited/authorized faculties from the Spiru Haret University may still proceed with their study, but will have to take (final) diploma exams at recognized universities (faculties) which are not prohibited to hold diploma exams.

The Romanian Department of Education has won the case against the claims of the Spiru Haret University in respect to Government Decisions no. 676/2007 and no. 635/2008, as the High Court of Cassation and Justice decided on October 30, 2009. As such, the self-removal the university from the application of such decisions is null and void, therefore its authorized/accredited curricula remain authorized/accredited, but all other claims of broader accreditation made in the name operating according to its constitutional right to academic autonomy have been dropped, since this right may only be exercised as provided by law. The Director of the Law and Control Direction of the Romanian Department of Education, Mr. Gabriel Ispas claimed that "Since we have won this trial, we cannot lose the subsequent trials."

The Government Decision no. 749/2009 has been reconsidered in Government Decision no. 943/2009. On November 10, 2009, at the Bucharest Appeal Court was registered at its office of the clerk the certificate in the Dossier no. 7174/2/2009, suspending the application of the Government Decisions no. 749/2009 and no. 943/2009 at the request of the Spiru Haret University, until judgment was pronounced in this case. The university called for being paid damages by the Romanian government and personally by the clerks who wrote the Government Decision no. 749/2009. In this trial, the significant difference in respect to the previous High Court trial is that the government did not list the Spiru Haret University in the Government Decision no. 749/2009, considering that this university does not want to be listed therein (according to the verdict of the Bucharest Court of Appeal which was canceled after the publication of the Government Decisions no. 749/2009), and listed it again in Government Decision no. 943/2009, when reconsidering Government Decision no. 749/2009, as demanded by the university, which has won a trial in this respect. Such government decisions are the official lists of all accredited/authorized Romanian curricula in a certain year. No other curriculum than those listed therein may issue a license diploma, and no other curriculum counts as higher education study (legally).

The Bucharest Court of Appeal reached a verdict on June 29, 2010, about the Government Decisions no. 749/2009 and no. 943/2009. The verdict of the Bucharest Court of Appeal rejects the action of the university because of having no ground and admits the request for intervention made by the Department of Education. Even if the Department of Education could not have predicted the verdict, the Romanian High Court of Justice and Cassation had registered the recourse made by the Romanian Department of Education in respect to the decision of the Bucharest Court of Appeal in the same dossier while its trial was still pending. Although the Department of Education has not fully lost the case judged by Bucharest Court of Appeal, it made recourse to the High Court and the university had there an opportunity to ask for the cancellation of the verdict of the Bucharest Court of Appeal by the High Court of Cassation and Justice. The Department of Education has won this trial, Decision no. 5565/14.12.2010 the High Court rejecting the request for suspending the execution of the administrative decision which the university has tried to cancel.

Also, this university is involved in administrative litigation against the Romanian Agency for Quality Assurance in Higher Education (ARACIS), the verdict having been pronounced on July 1, 2010. In this case also the action of the university was rejected because of having no ground; recourse is possible. The university has claimed that Government Ordinance no. 10/2009 would be unconstitutional and the Bucharest Court of Appeal suspended judgment upon this issue until the Constitutional Court will take a decision in respect to the claimed exception of unconstitutionality. On December 16, 2010, the Constitutional Court has rejected the unconstitutionality exception invoked by the university. But, Government Ordinance no. 10/2009 has been abrogated by Law no. 1/2011. On May 17, 2011, the Bucharest Court of Appeal rejected the action of the university as inadmissible; a recourse is possible.

On June 17, 2010, the Minister Daniel Petru Funeriu signed the Department of Education Order no. 4235/2010, published in Monitorul Oficial no. 421 of June 23, 2010. This order concerns the approval of the methodology for the special monitoring of the "Spiru Haret" University, monitoring which applies three years after the Government Ordinance no. 10/2009 became effective. The order stipulates that Spiru Haret's exams commissions for graduations have among their members professors/teachers from other universities, which are the representatives of the Romanian Department of Education in this respect. The commissions consist of at least one representative of the Department, the representatives of the Department being 50% of the total number of the members of each exams commission.

"The candidacy dossiers of 63 graduates of the "Spiru Haret" University were rejected by the Scholar Inspectorate Prahova" writes Raul Florea in the newspaper Gândul. The Minister Daniel Petru Funeriu announced that the university will be monitored for ten years, and the students which have received fraudulent diplomas will be reexamined.

A new scandal has arisen since the university has renamed its distance learning as "technological centers for accessing the examination platform e-learning", in order to hide the fact that it cannot offer authorized/accredited distance learning.

The university has announced that the 2008 and 2009 graduates of its unauthorized and unaccredited curricula will have to repeat the diploma exam in September 2010, at the same university. Mr. Gabriel Ispas has declared on behalf of the Department of Education that this does not imply that their diplomas will be lawfully recognized. According to the minister, an exams session was approved in September in order that the students may have their license exams in accordance with Government Ordinance no. 10/2009 and to the norms for special supervision of the "Spiru Haret" University. But there is no legal proviso which would allow the graduates to take their license exams again, Government Ordinance no. 10/2009 making reference only to the students of this university, thus it makes no reference to its licensed graduates. According to the Address of the Department of Education no. 13265 August 6, 2010, Law no. 84/1995 makes a clear distinction between "graduate" and "graduate with a diploma", the address of the department being applicable only of "graduates". Through this address the conditions for lawfully organizing an exams session for "graduates" are made known to the university. This exams session was postponed sine die, since the "Spiru Haret" University did not agree with the conditions stipulated by the Department of Education for holding these exams.

A graduate of this university has obtained the right to enjoy the benefits of her diploma by the irrevocable decision of the High Court of Cassation and Justice. It is to be noticed that the High Court did not recognize the validity of her diploma, but only the fact that her diploma has not been canceled by a court of law, and until such thing would happen, Mrs./Ms. Din enjoys the presumption of the legality of her diploma. The annulment of her diploma is possible, but it would require another trial.

According to the newspaper Adevărul, several groups of graduates from the Spiru Haret University have organized themselves in order to sue the Department of Education. The personal advisor of the education minister, Mr. Tudorel Urian, said "We wish them good luck, but this is a problem of those who allowed such exam to take place, it is a problem of the university".

Art. 120 the Education Law which will has become applicable in 2011 provides that offering diplomas for higher education curricula which are neither accredited nor temporarily authorized (by ARACIS) constitutes the felony of material falsification of official documents, punished according to the penal law. Happily, the law provides only for the future.

The Minister Daniel Petru Funeriu has declared that the Spiru Haret University will become illegal. "The new law provides very clearly what happens in such situations: the institution of higher education which has unaccredited curricula automatically becomes illegal and enters into liquidation" said Funeriu for Bună Ziua Iași, showing that this is of application for any university with unaccredited curricula, not just for the Spiru Haret University. On February 10, 2011 have to have been stopped any specializations and curricula which are neither accredited nor temporarily authorized, according to Art. 361 paragraph 4 of the Law of National Education. The continuation of such curricula causes the liquidation of the university and the criminal responsibility for those guilty of breaking the law.

A graduate of the Spiru Haret University has won a trial against the Department of Education and the County Schools Inspectorate at the Buzău Court. Such decision is not final, being open to a recourse by the Department and/or the Inspectorate.

Ziare.com announces that some students who graduated this university in 2009 will finally receive their diplomas (but only some of them, namely those from authorized/accredited studies and frequency forms).

Through the Decision no. 666 from August 19, 2010, the Superior Council of the Magistrates has noticed that a graduate of the Spiru Haret University who graduated the license exam in law in February 2010 at this university does not have the legal quality of having a license in law, as provided by Art. 14 alin. 2 letter b) of Law no. 303/2004, as such being inadmissible to the National Institute of the Magistrates.

According to the newspaper Gândul, the situation of those who graduated unaccredited and unauthorized studies will be decided in September, following a project drawn up by ARACIS and consulting the National Rectors's Council. Funeriu recognized that it applies to several universities and that his department does not have the right to cancel diplomas. In December 2011 the minister has declared that his department prepares an order in order to solve the matter of the graduates of unaccredited and unauthorized studies, but it has to wait for advice from the NRC. The minister hopes that this order will become applicable as soon as possible.

=== Problem solved in 2015 ===
Government Ordinance no. 42/2015 regarding the right of graduates to have recognized study papers after finishing unauthorized studies and for punishing educational institutions which teach without authorization provides state recognition for all unauthorized studies from accredited educational institutions, prior to the study year 2011–2012. Such diplomas can be canceled by courts or by the granting institution, according to the law.

=== UK NARIC (National Academic Recognition Information Centre) ===
In 2016 the UK National Academic Recognition Information Centre listed Spiru Haret University as a recognised higher education institution without making any distinctions between its full-time and distance learning graduates.

== Notable alumni ==
- Horia Ivanovici - journalist
