= Microsoft licensing corruption scandal =

Romanian corruption scandal

The Microsoft licensing corruption scandal was a political scandal and criminal investigation in Romania, involving large bribes paid to Romanian government members in exchange for approving increases in license fees for Microsoft products. It was called the 'biggest ever' Romanian corruption case. However, most of the charges were dropped in 2018 as the statute of limitations had expired (the charges were brought in 2015 and first contract signed in 2004).

Nine government ministers have been charged by the National Anticorruption Directorate, belonging to the Năstase, Tăriceanu and Boc Cabinets. The bribes were estimated at more than $50 million.

Apart from Microsoft, this scandal involved several major multinational corporations, including Fujitsu-Siemens, IBM, Compaq, Hewlett-Packard, S&T and local software companies like SIVECO and Softwin.

== Persons involved in scandal ==
According to Gheorghe Ștefan (a.k.a. "Pinalti"), more than 100 persons are involved in the corruption scandal, among them nine former ministers and prominent businessmen.

- Elena Udrea, President of the People's Movement Party (2014–15) and Minister of Tourism (2008–12)
- Adriean Videanu, Minister of Economy (2008–10) and Mayor of Bucharest (2005–08)
- Ecaterina Andronescu, Minister of Education (2000–03, 2008–09, 2012)
- Valerian Vreme, former Minister of Communications
- Șerban Mihăilescu, PSD senator
- Dan Nica, Minister of Communications (2000–04, 2012) and Minister of the Interior (2009)
- Adriana Țicău, PSD MEP
- Gabriel Sandu, Minister of Communications (2008–10)
- Daniel Funeriu, Minister of Education (2009–12)
- Alexandru Athanasiu, PSD MEP and Acting Prime Minister of Romania (1999)
- Mihai Tănăsescu, Member of the Trilateral Commission
- Dorin Cocoș, businessman and former spouse of Elena Udrea
- Gheorghe Ștefan, former mayor of Piatra Neamț
- Dumitru Nicolae, businessman

== Sentences ==
On 24 March 2016, Dorin Cocoș was sentenced to 2 years imprisonment for influence peddling and money laundering, and to an asset forfeiture of €3 million. Gabriel Sandu was sentenced to 2 years imprisonment for bribery and money laundering, and to an asset forfeiture of over €2 million. Gheorghe Ștefan was sentenced to 3 years imprisonment for influence peddling and to an asset forfeiture of €3 million. Dumitru Nicolae was convicted to 1 and a half years suspended sentence, €1 million forfeiture and 90 days community service. The sentences are not final and can be appealed.

On 3 October 2016, Dorin Cocoș was sentenced to 2 years 4 months imprisonment for influence peddling and money laundering, and to an asset forfeiture of €9 million. Gabriel Sandu was sentenced to 3 years imprisonment for bribery and money laundering, and to an asset forfeiture of over €2 million. Gheorghe Ștefan was sentenced to 6 years imprisonment for influence peddling and to an asset forfeiture of over €3 million. Nicolae Dumitru was convicted to 2 years 4 months imprisonment, $2,050,000 and €1 million forfeiture. These sentences are final.

== See also ==
- List of corruption scandals in Romania
