= Elena Udrea =

Romanian politician (born 1973)

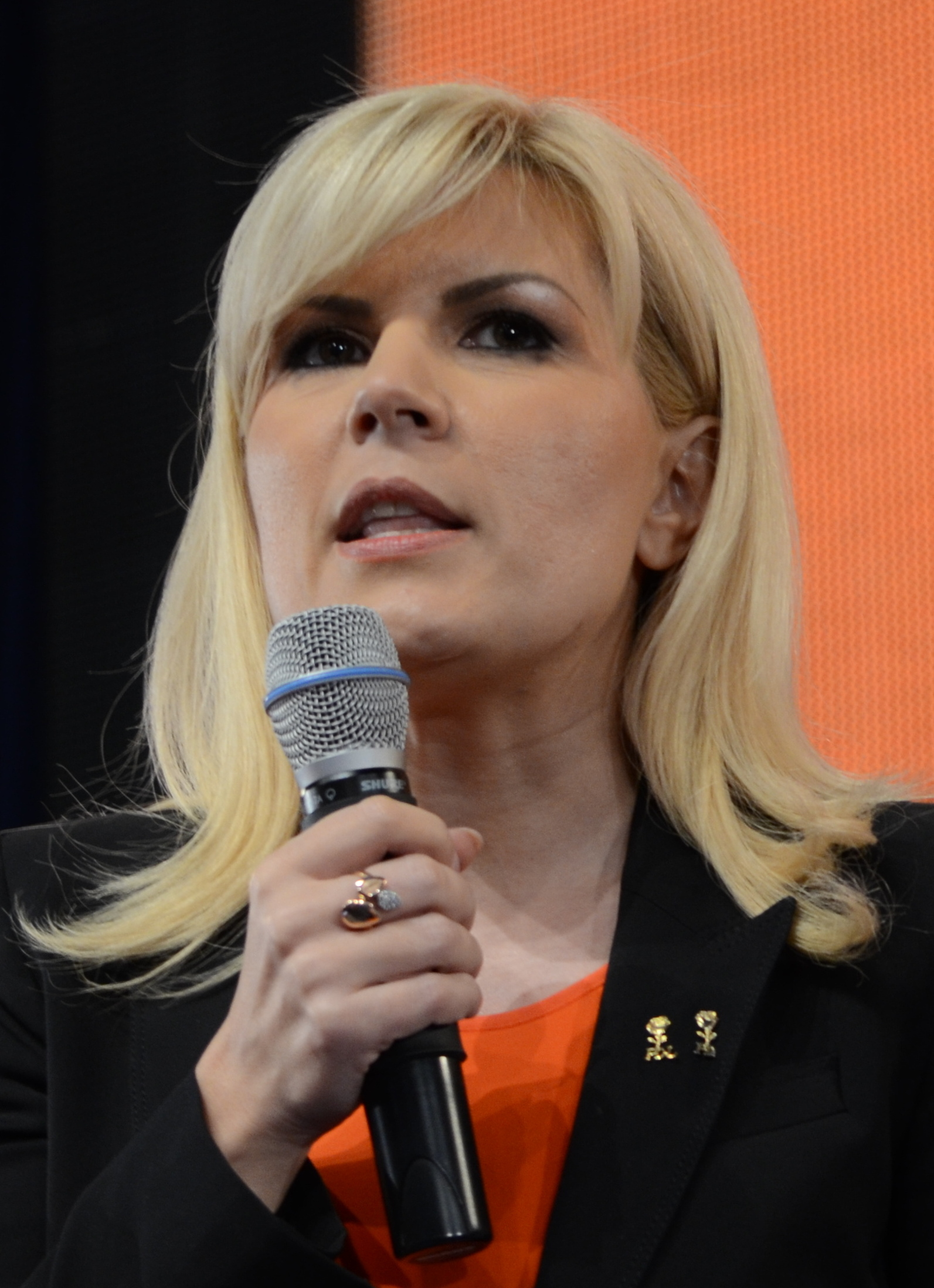
- Udrea at the 2013 PD-L convention

Minister of Regional Development and Tourism
- In office 23 December 2009 – 9 February 2012
- Prime Minister: Emil Boc
- Preceded by: Vasile Blaga (Regional Development); Herself (Tourism)
- Succeeded by: Cristian Petrescu

Minister of Tourism
- In office 22 December 2008 – 23 December 2009
- Prime Minister: Emil Boc
- Preceded by: Matei-Agathon Dan (2000–2003)
- Succeeded by: Herself (Regional Development and Tourism)

Member of the Chamber of Deputies
- In office 30 November 2008 – 20 December 2016

Member of the General Council of the Municipality of Bucharest
- In office June 2004 – February 2005
- Mayors: Traian Băsescu; Adriean Videanu

Leader of the People's Movement Party
- In office 8 June 2014 – 30 January 2015
- Preceded by: Eugen Tomac (Acting)
- Succeeded by: Eugen Tomac

Personal details
- Born: 26 December 1973 (age 52) Buzău, Romania
- Party: National Liberal Party (2002–2005); Liberal Democratic Party (2006–2007); Democratic Liberal Party (2007–2014); People's Movement Party (2014–2016)
- Spouse: Dorin Cocoș (m. 2003; div. 2013)
- Education: Dimitrie Cantemir Christian University; Carol I National Defence University

Elena Gabriela Udrea (Romanian pronunciation: [eˈlena ˈudre̯a]; born 26 December 1973) is a Romanian politician. An independent who held office while in the Democratic Liberal Party (PDL) and then the People's Movement Party (PMP), she was a member of the Romanian Chamber of Deputies from 2008 to 2016. In successive Emil Boc cabinets, she served as Tourism Minister from 2008 to 2009 and as Regional Development and Tourism Minister from 2009 to 2012. Sentenced to six years in prison for corruption offenses, she sought asylum in Costa Rica in 2018. The following year, she gave up the asylum claim and returned to Romania, where she served a sentence until her release in July 2025.

== Early life and education ==
Udrea was born in Buzău and completed secondary studies at the city's Bogdan Petriceicu Hasdeu National College. She then attended the faculty of Law and Public Administration at Bucharest's Dimitrie Cantemir Christian University, graduating in 1996.

In 2005, Udrea began studies at the Carol I National Defence University, receiving a master's degree in Military Science in 2007. She began work on a doctorate in the same field, but abandoned the endeavor in 2012. Udrea worked, as a lawyer in Bucharest from 1997 to February 2005, resuming the practice of law that December.

== Early career ==
At Dimitrie Cantemir, she began teaching political systems in autumn 2007, and she has authored or co-authored five works on geopolitics and globalisation. Some of her activities as a lawyer have drawn criticism from the non-governmental Political Investigation Group: for instance, it has questioned the fact that while an opposition city councillor in 2004, she represented the government-run Department for State Heritage Administration (RA-APPS), at one point receiving public contracts worth 710 million lei during a single week.

== Political career ==
Udrea began her political activity in 2002 as a legal adviser to the Social Democratic Party (PSD). She joined the National Liberal Party (PNL) that year, becoming a Bucharest city councillor in June 2004, during the period of the Justice and Truth Alliance. She held that office until the following February, and during that time was president of the council's committee on law and discipline. In October 2005 she resigned from the PNL, joining the Democratic Party (PD; precursor to today's PD-L) in February 2006. In December, she was elected the party's executive secretary, becoming a vice-president of the PD-L a year later. In these capacities, she promoted the party and spoke approvingly of the president, for instance ahead of the 2008 local election.

From February to November 2005, while away from her law practice, Udrea was a state counsellor and head of the Presidential Chancellery under President Traian Băsescu. Among her roles were summarizing secret documents addressed to the Presidency, approving lists of invitees to Cotroceni Palace and representing the Presidency at various events. During this period, she launched a series of attacks on Prime Minister Călin Popescu-Tăriceanu, who had fallen out of favour with Băsescu; these centred on Tăriceanu's opposition to having early elections. She also drew notice for speaking during a televised interview about a "President of Norway" (which is a monarchy) and of that country as a member of the European Union (which it is not). Udrea resigned her post after eight months, citing the "profoundly unjust" attacks on her and others involved in Băsescu's anti-corruption drive, and her desire not to become a liability for her boss. These controversies centred around the RA-APPS affair and alleged links she and her husband had to the parking firm Dalli, headed by what Băsescu had termed the "personal mafia" of his 2004 election rival Adrian Năstase. Moreover, she was characterised as "the blonde from Golden Blitz"—a Cotroceni restaurant once frequented by Băsescu and the owners of which had business ties to Udrea's husband—having been photographed there with President-elect Băsescu in 2004. (Despite rumours to the contrary, she stated in an interview that her relationship with the President was "strictly professional".)

Following her resignation, Udrea continued to act as a presidential surrogate, soon afterwards accusing the prime minister of placing a call to a prosecutor on behalf of his friend and business partner Dinu Patriciu on the day of Patriciu's arrest. She returned to this theme in 2007, when she alleged that Tăriceanu had written the president a note soliciting the latter's intervention in the case.

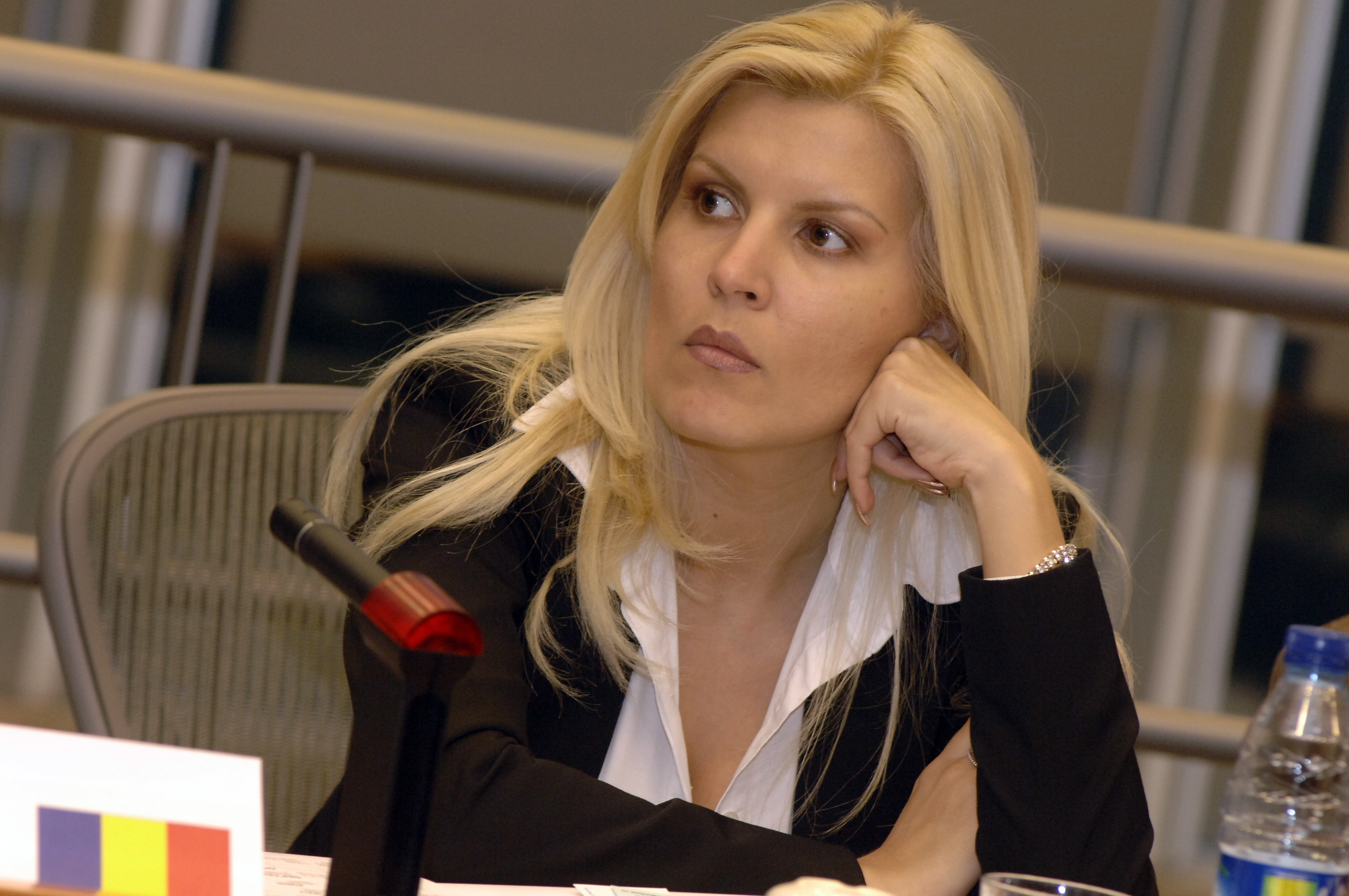
Udrea in 2006

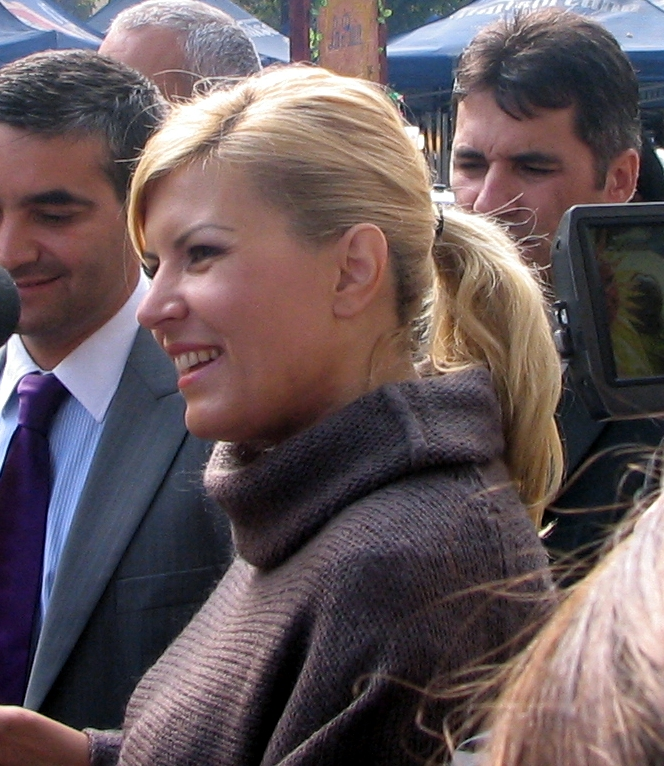
Udrea on a visit to Sinaia in 2009

At the 2008 legislative election, Udrea won 43.4% of the vote in her district, enough to gain a seat in Parliament for Bucharest once redistribution took place. Three days after the legislative session opened, she was sworn into the new office of Tourism Minister. All government employees on two floors of the Victoria Palace were evicted in order to make room for the new ministry. As minister, her goals included raising tourism's share of Romania's GDP from 3.5% in 2008 to 10% by 2012, and a renewed focus on the country's spa towns. During the summer of 2009, a parliamentary committee headed by Ludovic Orban of the opposition National Liberal Party (PNL) investigated alleged abuses at the ministry, including documents signed in Udrea's name by her subordinates, a flawed contracting process, the spending of unallocated funds, and the disbursement of money to town halls based on political rather than tourist-potential criteria. In September, the committee's report recommended her dismissal and criminal charges for abuse of office, conflict of interest and negligence; she refused to resign and denounced the "fabricated accusations".

That October, she became interim Environment Minister following the resignation of her PSD cabinet colleagues, including Nicolae Nemirschi, the previous occupant of that ministry. In December, a new cabinet, also led by Boc, came into office; there, Udrea held the Regional Development and Tourism portfolio. Along with the rest of the cabinet, she resigned in February 2012 amid anti-government protests. In July 2010, following the departure of Liviu Negoiţă, she became interim head of the Bucharest PD-L chapter, assuming the post on a permanent basis later that year when she was the only candidate to fill it, and vowing in her acceptance speech to "rid" the capital of independent Mayor Sorin Oprescu. She resigned from this position in the wake of the 2012 local election that saw the PD-L perform poorly in Bucharest, including Oprescu's winning a new term with a majority of votes cast. Shortly thereafter, she also quit her position as PD-L vice-president.

For the 2012 election, Udrea ran in a seat based in the city of Roman. Although placing second, she won another term through redistribution. In March 2013, Udrea ran for the PD-L leadership but was defeated by incumbent Vasile Blaga on a 51-44 margin. In January 2014, Udrea, whom Blaga was preparing to expel from the PD-L, resigned from the party following disagreements with his leadership record, and joined the People's Movement Party (PMP). That June, she was elected PMP president, defeating Daniel Funeriu on a 78-22 margin.

In August, the PMP candidate for the November presidential election, Cristian Diaconescu, quit the party and went ahead with a campaign as an independent amid moves by Udrea to assume his role. Subsequently, a party congress chose the latter as its new candidate, the only dissenting vote coming from Cristian Preda. At the election, she finished in fourth place, with 5.2% of the vote, and while not explicitly endorsing the Christian Liberal Alliance's Klaus Iohannis for the ensuing runoff, did urge her supporters to vote against the PSD's Victor Ponta.

== Legal problems ==
In January 2015, she was questioned by prosecutors from the National Anticorruption Directorate on charges of money laundering and false statements on declarations of assets, as part of a wider investigation into the Microsoft licensing corruption scandal. As a result, she stepped aside as PMP president, with Eugen Tomac taking over the party on an interim basis. The following month, she was indicted on two counts of influence peddling and one count of money laundering. The case was able to proceed after her parliamentary immunity was lifted. A second case involves charges of receiving bribes for a 2011 gala event in honor of boxer Lucian Bute. Udrea ran as an independent in the 2016 election and won some 3000 votes, well short of the approximately 25,000 needed to capture a seat.

In March 2017, she was convicted of bribery and abuse of power in the Bute case, receiving a six-year prison sentence, subject to appeal. Udrea reacted by characterizing the proceedings as a matter of life and death, stating she would not accept to go to prison for what she termed "completely unproven accusations" and "bald-faced lies"; she subsequently filed an appeal. That appeal was rejected in June 2018, when the High Court of Cassation and Justice upheld the six-year sentence.

At the beginning of 2018 Udrea had fled to Costa Rica, where she requested the right of asylum. Following the High Court ruling, the Romanian authorities announced their intention to seek Udrea's extradition, despite the lack of a treaty between the two countries regulating the procedure. On 3 October 2018, Elena Udrea and Alina Bica, the former Chief-Prosecutor of the Romanian Directorate for Investigating Organized Crime and Terrorism, who also requested the right of asylum in Costa Rica, were detained by the Costa Rican Judicial Investigation Department at Interpol's request and brought before the Criminal Court of the First Judicial Circuit of San José. A day later, the Criminal Court decided to remand Udrea and Bica for two months pending the presentation of the extradition papers by the Romanian authorities. However, she was released from jail on 26 December 2018 following the cancelation of her extradition process by Romania. The extradition process was canceled because her six-year sentence in the "Gala Bute" trial had been suspended by the High Court of Cassation and Justice on 21 December 2018 following the Constitutional Court's ruling that all high court's judge panels had not been formed legally.

Subsequently, Udrea returned to Romania on 8 July 2019, after the Constitutional Court of Romania had decided on 3 July that the three-judge panels who tried corruption cases were also illegal because not all judges in these panels were specialized in corruption.

In July 2020, the Romanian businessman Radu Budeanu admitted having intermediated a bribe from another businessman (whose identity remains unknown) to Udrea. The bribe was meant to make Udrea help the businessman renew long-term contracts between his commercial energy companies and the state-owned company Hidroelectrica. Although he initially promised Udrea US$5 million, Budeanu claimed to have intermediated several payments summing up to $3.8 million between November 2011 and February 2012. After Udrea's arrest in April 2022, Silvia Uscov became her main lawyer. On 25 October, Uscov told HotNews that Udrea based on the ÎCCJ's ruling five days earlier would be released from the Hidroelectrica case and the case regarding the financing of then-president Traian Băsescu's successful re-election campaign for the 2009 presidential election. After serving her sentence at Târgșor Prison, Udrea was conditionally released on 17 July 2025.

== Personal life ==
The businessman Dorin Cocoș became her husband when the couple married on Udrea's 30th birthday in 2003, at the Romanian Consulate in New York City. They divorced in June 2013.

In August 2011, Udrea generated controversy when she wore a Dolce & Gabbana dress that some media outlets claimed cost £14,310, to which she responded that the actual cost was some twenty times less. Three months later, she appeared on the cover of the Romanian magazine Tabu wearing a rubber dress and thigh-high boots.

On 20 September 2018, Elena Udrea gave birth to a baby girl in Costa Rica.

== Electoral history ==
=== Presidential elections ===
| Election | Affiliation | First round | | | Second round | | |
| Election | Affiliation | Votes | Percentage | Position | Votes | Percentage | Position |
|---|---|---|---|---|---|---|---|
| 2014 | PMP–PNȚ-CD Alliance | 493,376 | 5.20% | 4th | | | |

== See also ==
- List of corruption scandals in Romania
