= Fanatik =

Fanatik may refer to:

- Fanatik (Turkey), a Turkish newspaper
- Fanatik (Romania), a Romanian newspaper

== See also ==
- Fanatic (disambiguation)
