= Tibiscus University of Timișoara =

University in Timișoara, Romania

Tibiscus University
- Universitatea Tibiscus
- Former names: Institute of Studies and Continuing Education (1991–1998)
- Motto: Coloana pe care se sprijină educația ta!
- Motto in English: The pillar on which your education rests!
- Type: Private
- Established: 1991; 35 years ago
- Founders: Augusta and Aurel Anca
- Accreditation: ARACIS
- Rector: Dumitru Popovici
- Academic staff: 56 (2014/2015)
- Undergraduates: 919 (2014/2015)
- Postgraduates: 194 (2014/2015)
- Location: 6 Lascăr Catargiu Street, Timișoara, Romania; 45°45′6″N 21°14′31″E
- Website: tibiscus.ro
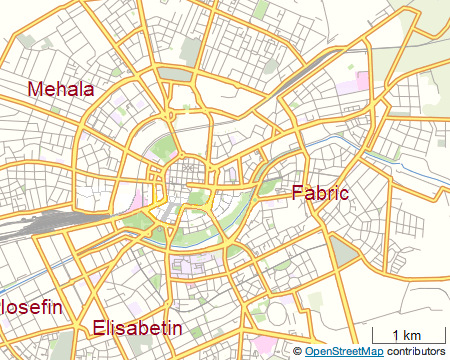
- Location in Timișoara

Tibiscus University is an accredited private university in Timișoara, Romania. It was established in 1991 and accredited by Law no. 484 of 11 July 2002.

== History ==
Tibiscus University started operating in 1991 as a limited liability company called the Institute of Studies and Continuing Education which organized university study programs, authorized to operate according to the legislative provisions of the time. In time, the institute changed its form of organization so that the study programs passed from the company, which was disbanded, to the association of the same name, ISEPT Tibiscus. In 1995, ISEPT Tibiscus founded, along with two other private structures, the Romanian Association for Unconventional Technologies and the Federation of Associated Farmers in Timiș County, a union called the Augusta Foundation.

Tibiscus University bears this name since 1998, established by court decision and confirmed by newer acts of the Romanian Agency for Quality Assurance in Higher Education, the Ministry of Education and the Romanian Parliament. The legal separation of the higher education institution from its founders took place in 2002 when Tibiscus University was established and implicitly accredited by law.

The university has been marked over time by numerous internal conflicts between the founders and the university management. Specifically, since 2005, the founders have been blocked from making any further decisions and have been stripped of the unit's stamp. All this culminated in the decision of the Ministry of Education in 2018 to liquidate all university study programs and transfer existing students to other universities. At the same time, the Ministry of Education found that the university did not have a statutory management and a proper university charter. Also, the university was not allowed to organize an admission session at any of the four faculties. However, after the sacking of the university management by court decision in November of the same year, the Ministry of Education allowed Tibiscus University to draw up a new university charter and hold general elections for the Senate and rector.

== Faculties ==
The university has four faculties, each with its own infrastructure.

Faculty	Established	Bachelor's degree programs	Master's degree programs
Computers and Applied Computer Science fcia.tibiscus.ro	2000	1: Computer science	2: Distributed systems administration; Web design
Economics fse.tibiscus.ro		1: Accounting and management information systems	1: Audit and evaluation of the enterprise
Law and Public Administration fdap.tibiscus.ro	1991	1: Law	1: Institutions of European law
Psychology fp.tibiscus.ro	2002	1: Psychology	1: Psychotherapies and clinical psychology

Over time, the university has had four other faculties:

- Design (closed in 2012);
- Journalism, Communication and Modern Languages (closed in 2012);
- Music (closed in 2010);
- Physical Education and Sports (closed in 2010).

== Infrastructure ==
Tibiscus University operates in three buildings: the rectory building (R building), B building and C building, the latter two for educational activities. The university has six lecture rooms, 13 seminar rooms, 10 laboratories and two library rooms. Although each faculty has a research center, the university does not have its own dormitories and canteen. The library of the university was founded in 1992. The library operates in its own space in the B building, in 10 rooms out of which five are designed for book depository. As of 2009, the library's bookstock consists of 75,529 publications.
