= Petrescu =

- Language: Romanian

Origin
- Meaning: son of Petre

Petrescu is a patronymic surname common in Romania, meaning "son of Petre". Notable people with this surname include:

- Anca Petrescu, architect and politician
- Barbu Petrescu, mayor of Bucharest (1989–1990)
- Camil Petrescu, writer
- Cezar Petrescu, writer
- Constantin Titel Petrescu, social-democratic politician
- Costin Petrescu, painter
- Costin Petrescu, rock music drummer
- Cristian Petrescu, politician
- Dan Petrescu (disambiguation)
- Daniela Petrescu, long-distance runner
- Dimitrie Petrescu-Stelaru, writer
- Dumitru Petrescu, communist politician
- Emil Petrescu, mayor of Bucharest (1914–1916; 1918)
- Ghenadie Petrescu, deposed Romanian Metropolitan Patriarch
- Gică Petrescu, singer
- Marian Petrescu (born 1970), Romanian jazz pianist
- Nicolae Petrescu (1886–1954), philosopher and sociologist
- Nicolae Petrescu-Comnen, diplomat and politician
- Nicolae Petrescu Găină, painter
- Teodosie Petrescu, Archbishop of Tomi

It is also the maiden name of:

- Elena Ceaușescu, communist politician and wife of Nicolae Ceaușescu
- Rodica Mateescu, triple jumper
