= Cristian Diaconescu =

Romanian jurist and politician

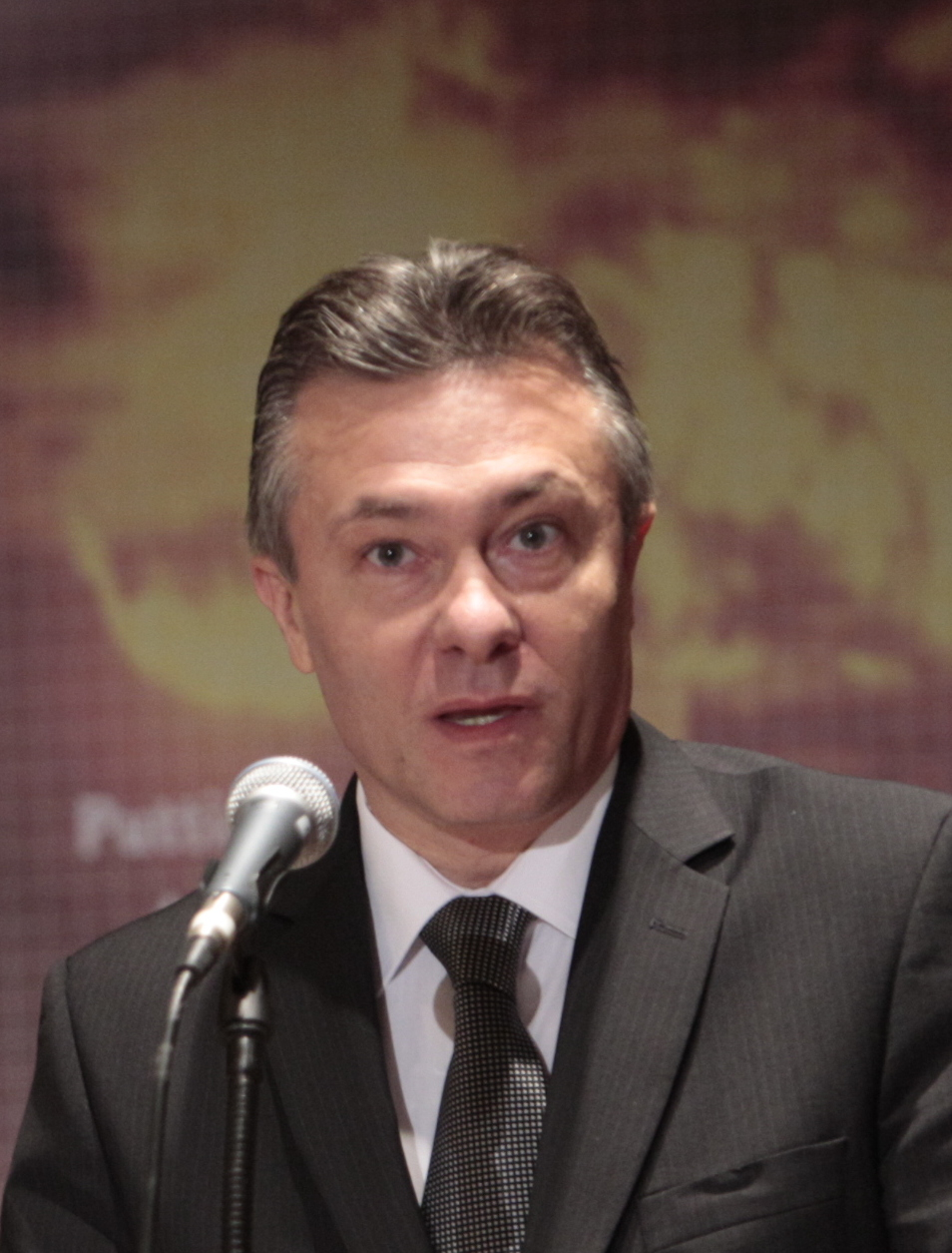
- Diaconescu in 2009

Leader of the People's Movement Party
- In office 7 March 2021 – 19 February 2022
- Preceded by: Emil-Marius Pașcan (Acting)
- Succeeded by: Eugen Tomac

Minister of Foreign Affairs
- In office 24 January 2012 – 7 May 2012
- Prime Minister: Emil Boc; Mihai Răzvan Ungureanu
- Preceded by: Teodor Baconschi
- Succeeded by: Andrei Marga
- In office 22 December 2008 – 1 October 2009
- Prime Minister: Emil Boc
- Preceded by: Lazăr Comănescu
- Succeeded by: Cătălin Predoiu (interim)

Member of the Senate of Romania
- In office 15 December 2008 – 29 May 2012
- Constituency: Bucharest
- In office 13 December 2004 – 14 December 2008
- Constituency: Constanța County

Minister of Justice
- In office 10 March 2004 – 28 December 2004
- Prime Minister: Adrian Năstase
- Preceded by: Rodica Stănoiu
- Succeeded by: Monica Macovei

State Secretary at the Ministry of Foreign Affairs
- In office 28 December 2000 – January 2004
- Prime Minister: Adrian Năstase
- Minister: Mircea Geoană

Personal details
- Born: 2 July 1959 (age 67) Bucharest, Romania
- Party: Independent (2022–present)
- Other political affiliations: Romanian Communist Party (until 1989); Social Democratic Party (2002–2010); National Union for the Progress of Romania (2010–2012); People's Movement Party (2014; 2020–2022)
- Spouse: Mariana Diaconescu
- Children: Mariana
- Education: University of Bucharest
- Occupation: Judge, Diplomat, Politician
- Profession: Jurist

Cristian Diaconescu (Romanian pronunciation: [kristiˈan di.akoˈnesku]; born 2 July 1959) is a Romanian jurist and politician. He previously belonged to the National Union for the Progress of Romania (UNPR) and the Social Democratic Party (PSD), as well as to the People's Movement Party (PMP), which he led from 2021 to 2022. He sat in the Romanian Senate from 2004 to 2012, representing Constanța County from 2004 until 2008, and subsequently Bucharest. In the Adrian Năstase cabinet, he was Minister of Justice from March to December 2004; in the Emil Boc cabinet, he was Minister of Foreign Affairs between 2008 and 2009. He returned to the position in 2012, also under Boc, and continued in this capacity under Boc's successor, Mihai Răzvan Ungureanu.

== Biography ==
=== Judicial and diplomatic career ===
He was born in Bucharest, where his father Mihai was a lawyer; he is a seventh-generation jurist. He completed his mandatory military service in 1978–1979 within a unit troops answering to the Securitate, Communist Romania's secret police, ending as a 2nd Lieutenant and later recalling that his instruction was purely in regular combat. In April 1982, he entered the ruling Romanian Communist Party (PCR), advancing from its mass organization, the Union of Communist Youth (UTC). Although he denied having held any executive positions within the party, a 2008 investigation by Evenimentul Zilei newspaper concluded that Diaconescu was promoted to a leadership office within the Association of Communist Students, and that he was judged a good student of Marxism. Diaconescu graduated from the Law Faculty of the University of Bucharest in 1983, also earning a PhD in law in 2007. He was an associate professor at Hyperion University in 1993, a professor at the Carol I National Defence University in 1997 and at the Institute of Law and International Relations from 1998 to 2000, and in 2004 was on the academic staff of the Spiru Haret University in its International Relations and European Studies Faculty.

In 1983, he was an apprentice lawyer in Găești; from 1983 to 1985, he worked as a judge at the Ilfov Agricultural Sector courthouse, and from 1985 to 1989, he was a judge at the Sector 4 courthouse. During this period, he would sometimes travel to villages for trials; according to Silviu Curticeanu (a former high-ranked Communist), these were held before packed audiences forcibly brought there, with judges usually selected based on political criteria often handing out especially harsh sentences for the "preventive-educational" effect these were supposed to have. Following the 1989 Revolution, from 1989 to 1990, he was a specialty inspector at the Justice Ministry, part of a team of youthful specialists who, as he recalled fifteen years later, unsuccessfully toured the country in an attempt to reshape the Communist-era justice system. Then, from 1990 to 1993, he was a diplomat in Romania's permanent delegation to the Organization for Security and Co-operation in Europe (OSCE). From 1993 to 1995, working at the Foreign Affairs Ministry, Diaconescu coordinated the cooperation section in the OSCE political–military field. From 1995 to 1996 he was again a diplomat, part of Romania's permanent mission to international organisations in Vienna and deputy head of mission for the OSCE political–military and security fields. From 1996 to 1997, still a diplomat, he worked at the OSCE directorate of the Foreign Affairs Ministry. In 1997–1998, at the same ministry, he headed the directorate for OSCE and cooperation with sub-regional structures. Continuing at the ministry, from 1998 to 2000 he headed its general law and consular directorate; among his attributes was that of chief negotiator for bilateral treaties on borders and minority rights. From May to December 2000, he was deputy general secretary of the Organization of the Black Sea Economic Cooperation.

=== In government and electoral politics ===
In December 2000, when the PDSR (PSD from 2001) returned to office, Diaconescu became Secretary of State for Bilateral Affairs at the Foreign Affairs Ministry. Serving until January 2004, he was chief negotiator for the border treaty with Ukraine, for the basic political treaty with Russia and for the law on Hungarians in states bordering Hungary. He also joined the PSD in 2002. From January to March 2004, he was Secretary of State for European Affairs at the same ministry. From March to December 2004, he served as Minister of Justice. As such, he was responsible for conducting and closing negotiations with the European Commission on the Justice and Home Affairs chapter of the acquis communautaire; that November, he reported to the government that negotiations had been concluded, helping move Romania closer to European Union accession. At the 2004 election, which the PSD lost, he won a Senate seat, and chaired that body's defence, public order and national security committee. In 2005, he became a vice president of the PSD; that June, he was named PSD spokesman, a position he kept until January 2009, except during his mayoral campaign. (Additionally, in 2006, shortly before the National Anticorruption Directorate announced it would question his wife in its investigation into the loss of €1 million in state funds while she was a bank president, he announced he would resign his party positions partly in connection with this, but reversed course several days later.) Diaconescu reluctantly agreed to run for Mayor of Bucharest in June 2008, promising a doubling of the minimum monthly salary and an additional pension payment per year. He lost in the first round, coming in third with 13.2% of the vote. He was re-elected as senator in November 2008, and the following month, he was named to the Boc cabinet.

Upon winning confirmation as minister, among the priorities Diaconescu announced were a consolidation of Romania's position within the EU, including by pushing for ratification of the Lisbon Treaty; regional policy, including toward Moldova and the Black Sea area; and securing the rights of the Romanians of Serbia. Later, in an interview, he added that improving relations with Russia and China was also on his agenda, as well as having the EU focus on energy security. He visited the United States in May 2009, meeting with Secretary of State Hillary Clinton and commenting that Romania continued to be a "trustworthy partner" for the US, in turn an "essential ally" of Romania. The issue of Moldova vividly appeared on the agenda during the April 2009 civil unrest, when Diaconescu commented that the authorities there had "exceeded limits" by arresting protesters without explanation, requiring visas of Romanians wishing to enter the country, expelling all Romanian journalists, and "provoking" the Romanian government by accusing it of involvement in the events. He soon announced that Moldovans would be able to obtain Romanian citizenship more easily. Additionally, he had to deal with the sometimes tense situation faced by Romanian citizens living in Italy and the United Kingdom. Together with his PSD colleagues, Diaconescu resigned from the cabinet on 1 October 2009, in protest at the dismissal of vice prime minister and Interior Minister Dan Nica.

=== Defection from PSD and subsequent developments ===
In February 2010, Diaconescu sought election as PSD president, but withdrew from the race several hours before the party congress that would decide the winner opened. Subsequently, journalist Floriana Jucan alleged that Diaconescu had been subject to round-the-clock surveillance for ten days prior to the congress, and that party colleagues had carried out the monitoring in order to blackmail him. Near the end of the month, he resigned from the party and from its vice presidency, also filing a judicial complaint asking for an investigation into his surveillance. Initially sitting as an independent in Gabriel Oprea's group, he followed the latter into the newly founded UNPR, being elected honorary president in May. In February 2011, he was elected one of the Senate's vice presidents.

Following the dismissal of Teodor Baconschi during anti-government protests, Diaconescu was once again named foreign minister in January 2012. After Boc and his cabinet resigned the following month, Diaconescu was retained in his post by incoming prime minister Ungureanu. He left office in May due to the Ungureanu cabinet's dismissal by a motion of no confidence. Quickly named an adviser to President Traian Băsescu, whereupon he left the Senate, as well as resigning from the UNPR, he was dismissed that August by interim President Crin Antonescu, but resumed his post once Băsescu returned as president. He left the Băsescu administration in April 2014, joining the People's Movement Party (PMP) the following month. In June, he was named the party's candidate for the November presidential election. In August, prior to a move by party president Elena Udrea to take his place as the PMP candidate, he resigned from the party and announced he would continue his campaign as an independent. Ten days later, he abandoned his candidacy and endorsed Udrea.

In early 2020, Diaconescu rejoined the PMP. A year later, he was unanimously elected party president, and was simultaneously announced as its 2024 candidate for President of Romania. His eleven-month term ended when supporters of former PMP leader Eugen Tomac convened a party congress. In spite of Diaconescu's claim that the meeting was invalid, the delegates elected Tomac to a new term. Diaconescu would later be expelled from the PMP by the newly elected leadership of the party. In February 2025, he was named defense and national security adviser to interim president Ilie Bolojan.

== Electoral history ==
=== Mayor of Bucharest ===
Election	Affiliation	First round			Second round		
Election	Affiliation	Votes	Percentage	Position	Votes	Percentage	Position
2008	PSD	67,251	12.33%	3rd	not qualified		
