= Eugen Tomac =

Romanian politician (born 1981)

Eugen Tomac MEP
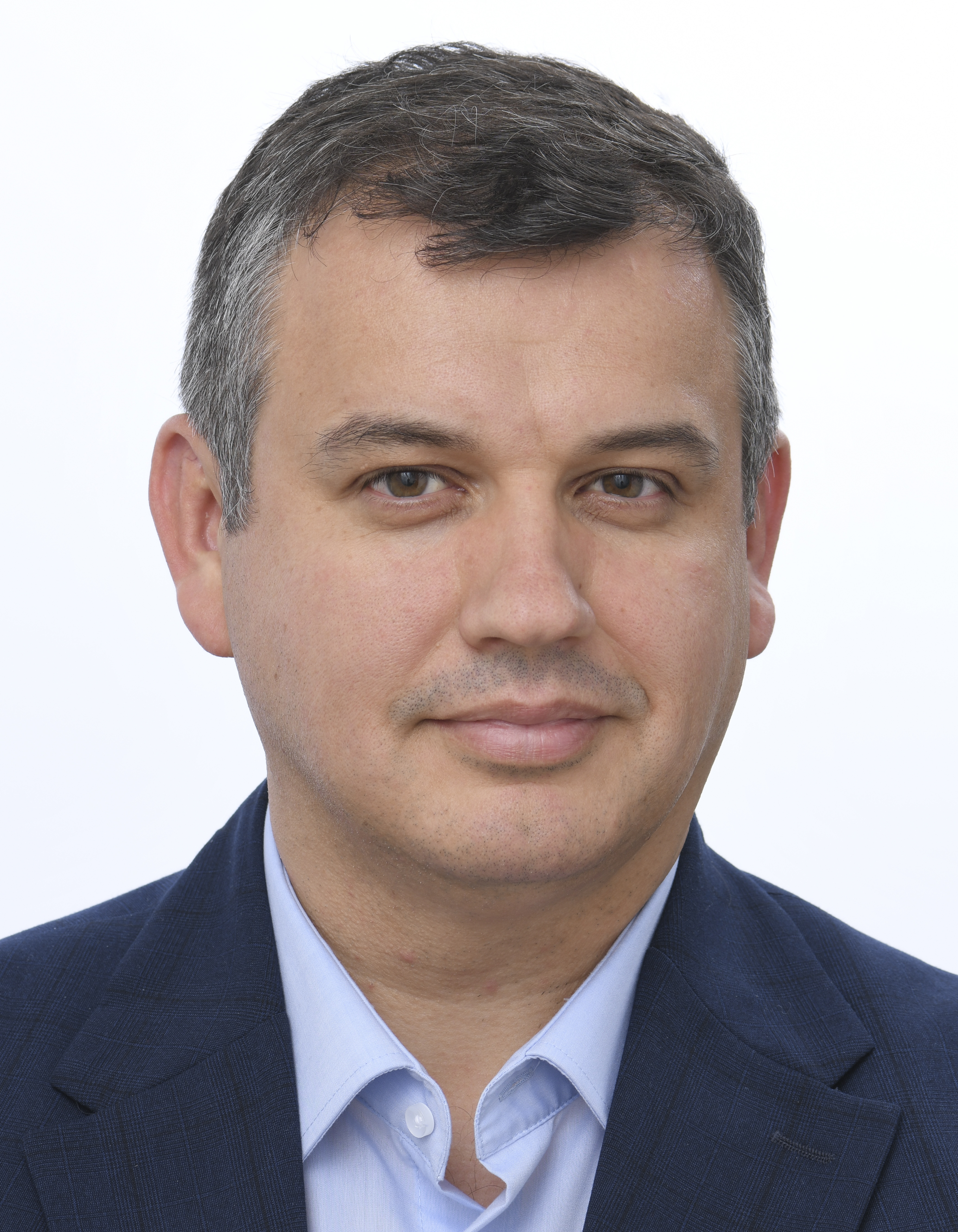
- Official portrait, 2024

Member of the European Parliament for Romania
- Incumbent
- Assumed office 2 July 2019

Member of the Chamber of Deputies
- In office 19 December 2012 – 20 June 2019
- Constituency: Diaspora (2012–2016); Bucharest (2016–2019)

Leader of the People's Movement Party
- In office 19 February 2022 – 3 June 2026
- Preceded by: Cristian Diaconescu
- In office 16 June 2018 – 9 December 2020
- Preceded by: Traian Băsescu
- Succeeded by: Emil-Marius Pașcan (acting)
- In office 30 January 2015 – 27 March 2016
- Preceded by: Elena Udrea
- Succeeded by: Traian Băsescu
- In office 23 June 2013 – 8 June 2014
- Preceded by: Party established
- Succeeded by: Elena Udrea

Personal details
- Born: 27 June 1981 (age 44) Babele, Ukrainian SSR, Soviet Union (now Ukraine)
- Citizenship: USSR (1981–1991); Ukraine (1991–2000); Romania (since 2000); Moldova
- Party: Democratic Liberal Party (before 2013); People's Movement Party (2013–present)
- Other party: European People's Party (before 2024); Renew Europe (2024–present)
- Education: University of Bucharest

Eugen Tomac (Note: Romanian pronunciation: [e.uˈd͡ʒen toˈmak]) (born 27 June 1981) is a Romanian politician, historian and journalist currently serving as MEP in the European Parliament for Romania since 2019. He was also the President of the People's Movement Party (PMP).

== Early life ==
Tomac was born in Ozerne (Romanian: Babele), Ukraine, a village in the south of Bessarabia, formerly in Ismail County. He came to Romania at the age of 17, through a scholarship program offered by the Romanian Government to Romanians living abroad.

Active in politics from early adulthood, Tomac was president of the League for Romanian Youth Abroad from 2000 to 2004 and then coordinator of youth national projects at the Democratic Education Center. From 2004 to 2006, he was coordinator of the "News to Know" project, implemented with the support of the United States Department of State in the disadvantaged rural areas of Romania. He also worked as editor at the Ziua and Confluențe newspapers, and at the Romanian Public Radio and Television.

== Studies ==
Tomac graduated from the History Faculty at the University of Bucharest in 2003 with thesis "Basarabia, a Romanian Province on the Outskirts of the USSR". He earned his master's degree in 2004 from the same university, with the thesis paper "Mechanisms of Denationalization in the USSR".

== Professional career ==
During his university years, Tomac was an editor at the Magazin Istoric, a history journal, where he published several studies about Bessarabia and Romanians abroad. Later, he taught history at the Eudoxiu Hurmuzachi Institute for Romanians Abroad (within the Ministry of Foreign Affairs), where he was once a student and where Romanians from Albania, Macedonia, the Republic of Moldova, Serbia, and Ukraine study.

In 2006, at the age of 25, Tomac joined the Presidential Administration as an Expert, responsible for relations with Romanians Everywhere. On 23 December 2009, he was appointed Secretary of State for Romanians Abroad, within the Ministry of Foreign Affairs until 7 May 2012.

After the formal establishment of the Department for Romanians Abroad under the Prime Minister's coordination, Tomac was appointed Secretary of State for the Boc and Ungureanu governments, and under his leadership, he actively contributed to the simplification of the process for the regaining of Romanian citizenship for Romanians from the Republic of Moldova. Tomac also decided on the donation of over one million Romanian books for libraries and schools in the Republic of Moldova, and the re-publishing of almost half a million Romanian History manuals for educational institutions in Moldova.

With the fall of the Ungureanu government, Tomac resigned as Secretary of State on 11 May 2012. A week after his resignation, he was appointed State Counselor to the Department of International Relations and European Policy of the Presidential Administration.

== Political activity ==
Tomac started his political formal political career as a member of the Democratic Liberal Party (PDL). As first Vice-Chair of the Romanians Abroad LDP organization, he was proposed to run the campaign for the Parliamentary elections in 2008, applying for the seat of Deputy, representing the Romanians from Eastern Europe and Asia. Although he had the most votes, due to the uninominal voting protocol, he did not win.

During the next Parliamentary elections, he ran again and won the seat in the Parliament in the same County (Eastern Europe and Asia) with the highest score among his party colleagues, 78.7% of the votes. He was subsequently appointed Chairman of the Parliamentary Committee for the Romanian Communities Abroad. Shortly after he was elected, in May 2013, he opened the first parliamentary office in the capital of the Republic of Moldova, Chișinău, for helping Romanians in Moldova to solve the problems the Romanian institutions are competent for. As deputy, he drafted and initiated several law projects for supporting the Romanians living abroad and improving relations with the Republic of Moldova.

In July 2013, he resigned from the PLD and founded a new party, the Popular Movement Party (PMP), supported by Romania's former President Traian Băsescu. Băsescu was president of the party and Eugen Tomac executive president until June, 2018 when Tomac was elected party president.

In 2015, Tomac was put by the Russian Federation on a blacklist of 89 politicians and officials from the European Union who are not allowed entry into Russia under its current sanctions regime.

In June 2016, he ran in the Bucharest's Sector 1 mayoral campaign. At the end of the same year, he was elected for the second time in the Romanian Parliament's Chamber of Deputies, representing Romanians from Bucharest. He was the leader of the Parliamentary Group of the People Movement Party from the Chamber of Deputies.

In May 2019, he was elected as a Member of the European Parliament representing The National Movement Party, along with former President of Romania, Traian Băsescu. In the European Parliament, he is part of the Group of the European People's Party (Christian Democrats) and he is a member of the Committee on Employment and Social Affairs, of the Subcommittee on Human Rights and of the Special Committee on Foreign Interference in all Democratic Processes in the European Union, including Disinformation. He is also member of several delegations of the European Parliament: the Delegation to the Euronest Parliamentary Assembly, the Delegation for relations with Serbia. and the Delegation for Relations with South Caucasus.

As a Member of the European Parliament, his activities centre around the Eastern Partnership dimension and the Balkans, as well as democracy, rule of law, human rights, employment and social policies, children’s rights, the protection of the Romanian diaspora, and the rights of the Romanian minority in the world. In his interventions in the plenary of the European Parliament, he has been very vocal against Russia's disregard of human rights, the rule of law, freedom of speech and against Russia’s interventions and influence in sovereign states. He has also often raised concerns regarding the presence of Russian military troops on the territory of the Republic of Moldova and timely signalled the danger of the amassing of Russian troops at the Ukrainian border and the autocratic regime in Belarus.

Tomac has been an active advocate of the proper implementation of the European Child Guarantee in the EU member states, the tackling of child poverty and social exclusions so that no child is left behind in Europe.

Tomac resigned as chairman of the People's Movement Party on June 3, 2026, in a move that foreshadowed his appointment as prime minister.

In June 2026 President Nicușor Dan nominated him as a Prime Ministerial candidate, but, following his failure to obtain support from the legislature, he resigned the mandate.

== Electoral history ==
=== Mayor of Sector 1 ===
Election	Affiliation	First round		
Election	Affiliation	Votes	Percentage	Position
2016	PMP	5,473	7.32%	4th

== Published papers ==
Eugen Tomac coordinated the "Focus on Romanians" study, a report on the situation of Romanians living abroad and revealing major aspects of discrimination. The main chapters addressed in this first public report published in Romania after 1989 present the current situation of the education and mass-media in Romanian in these communities (February 2005).

Tomac also coordinated the Romanian near us, LEX collection "Romanian communities – rights and universal norms," a legal guide that includes universal and European laws on the protection of minorities and the fight against ethnic discrimination (December 2004).

== Specializations ==
- 2007: Romanian Institute of Economic and Social Research and Surveys, Human Resources Management
- 2007: International Visitor Leadership Program 2006, "NGO Management", Washington, Non-Governmental Organizations Management
- 2003: The Center for Euro-Atlantic Studies, European and Euro-Atlantic Studies
- 1999: The Eudoxiu Hurmuzachi Institute for Romanians Abroad

== Honors ==
- 2011: Vocația Spiritului Balcanic Award, Balcanii și Europa Magazine.
- 2010: "Sfântul Gheorghe, Purtătorul de Biruință" Order of the Bessarabian Metropolitan Church
- 2009: Dimitrie Cantemir Commemorative Medal, Magazin Istoric Cultural Foundation
