= Daniel Funeriu =

Romanian politician

Daniel Funeriu Ph.D.
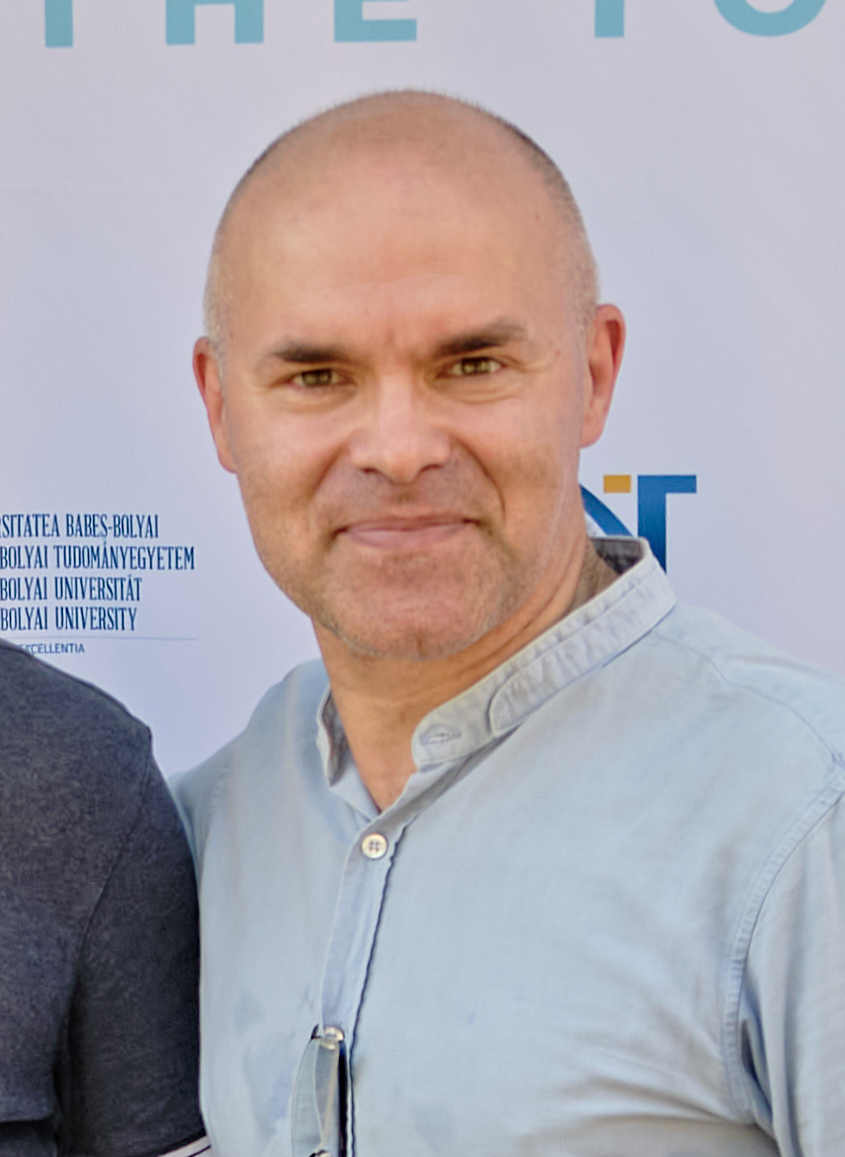
- Funeriu in 2024

Head of Education and Research department at Romanian President Presidential Advisor, Minister Rank
- In office 12 February 2012 – 1 February 2014
- Preceded by: Cristian Preda

Minister of Education, Research and Innovation
- In office 23 December 2009 – 8 February 2012
- Prime Minister: Emil Boc
- Preceded by: Emil Boc
- Succeeded by: Cătălin Baba

Member of the European Parliament for Romania
- In office 22 December 2008 – 13 July 2009

Personal details
- Born: Daniel Petru Funeriu; 11 April 1971 (age 55) Arad, Romania
- Citizenship: Romania; France
- Party: Liberal Democratic Party (2006–2007); Democratic Liberal Party (2007–2014); People's Movement Party (2014); European People's Party
- Spouse: Sandra Funeriu
- Children: 2
- Education: École européenne de chimie, polymères et matériaux Louis Pasteur University
- Profession: Chemist

Daniel Petru Funeriu (born 11 April 1971) is a Romanian politician.

Born in Arad, he was a high school student when he fled Communist Romania for France in 1988. There, he studied chemistry at the University of Strasbourg, graduating in 1994 and obtaining a doctorate from the same institution in 1999.

== Early life and education ==
Daniel P. Funeriu (Petru-Daniel Funeriu) was born on April 11, 1971, in Arad, his parents being teachers in Birchiș. His father is Ionel Funeriu, and his mother Maria Funeriu, a Romanian language teacher. He has a sister. He spent the first years of his life with his parents and maternal grandfather in Săvârșin, and at the age of two the family moved to Timișoara, his father becoming a researcher at the Romanian Academy, and his mother an assistant professor at the University of Timișoara. His father is a reputed philologist, his major achievement being a fundamental revision of the theory of Romanian versification. In 1981 he published Romanian Versification, a Linguistic Perspective. Using the principles enunciated in his theory on versification, Ionel Funeriu discovered and corrected hundreds of errors in the editing of Alexandru Macedonski's poetry, a discovery that gave rise to a controversy with Macedonski's publisher, Adrian Marino.

Daniel P. Funeriu's maternal grandparents were originally from Podu Turcului, Bacău County, and his paternal grandparents were peasant householders from Pâncota, Arad County. His paternal grandfather fought at Stalingrad, where he was wounded. Funeriu often talks about the folk wisdom acquired from his grandparents.

In 1976 he lost his mother and lived until 1978 with his grandfather in Săvârșin, where he started school, being a classmate of Cristian Herbei, one of the heroes of the Romanian Revolution in 1989, who was killed in Otopeni. In the second grade, he moved to Timișoara to the special gymnastics class of the General School no. 18 where, in a parallel class, Igor Bergler, who became a successful author, was studying. He practiced gymnastics, athletics and football and had good grades in science. In the eighth grade, he qualified for the first time for the National Chemistry Olympiad, where he met and was inspired by several young people who would later become great researchers, such as: Adrian Șalic, now a professor at Harvard Medical School, Mihai Bărboiu, Traian Sulea, and Dragoș Horvat. Funeriu would say about them that they were compasses worth following.

In 1985 he passed with an average of 9.75 the entrance examination to the very selective High School of Philology and History (now the Banat College), the chemistry-biology class, where he continued his passion for chemistry. In 1988, in the eleventh grade, he won the silver medal at the Balkan Chemistry Olympiad in Sofia, Bulgaria. In the summer of 1988, taking advantage of a trip to France, he defected and settled in Strasbourg, where he was admitted to the Lycée International des Pontonniers. Being under 18 years old and without parents or resources, he received support at the beginning of his stay in France from the social protection system. A few months after arriving in France, he won the second prize at the French Chemistry Olympiad. Thanks to the Olympiad prize, on the recommendation of Professor Jean-Marie Lehn, a recent Nobel laureate (1987), he received a scholarship from a local bank, which allowed him, together with the financial prize from the Olympiad and various temporary jobs (bartender, waiter, tutoring, and laboratory), to continue his studies after the baccalaureate obtained in the summer of 1989. He attended the elite Classes Préparatoires aux Grandes Ecoles course at Lycée Kléber in Strasbourg, and in 1991 he was admitted to the European Higher Institute of Chemistry of Strasbourg (now European School of Chemistry, Polymers and Materials Science, École européenne de chimie, polymères et matériaux) and became, in 1992, a laboratory worker in Professor Lehn's laboratory, where he worked on his first research project. After graduating as a chemical engineer in 1994 and a short period at Merck & Co. in the United States, in 1995 he completed his studies as valedictorian. He obtained the "Diplôme d'Études Approfondies" in organic and supramolecular chemistry at the Université de Strasbourg and began his doctoral studies in Professor Lehn's laboratory.

After completing his doctorate in 1999, obtained with the highest distinction "Très honorable avec félicitations", he worked for a period as a postdoctoral researcher at The Scripps Research Institute in La Jolla, California and, after 2002, as a researcher at the National Institute of Advanced Science and Engineering in Amagasaki, Japan. In 2006, he received an offer to lead a research group at the Max Plank Institute for Molecular Physiology in Dortmund and, at the same time, won a Marie Curie Excellence grant of two million euros. He chose the Technical University of Munich (TUM), where he was part of the team that conceived the university's candidacy for the German government's newly launched Exzellenzinitiative. Together with the team of rector Wolfgang Herrmann, he supported the university's candidacy that was declared the winner, which brought over 45 million euros to the university.

== Private life ==
Funeriu is married to Sandra Funeriu, a French citizen, whom he met at a party in Strasbourg in 1994 and with whom he has two children.

== Early political career ==
From December 2008 to July 2009, Funeriu represented Romania in the European Parliament, sitting for the Democratic Liberal Party. From December 2009 until February 2012, he was Education Minister in the cabinet led by Emil Boc. Shortly thereafter, he became an advisor to President Traian Băsescu.

He attracted the attention of the Romanian press and, in 2007 he became vice-president of the Presidential Commission for the analysis and elaboration of policies in the fields of education, appointed by President Traian Băsescu. He was invited to run in the European Parliament elections on behalf of the Liberal Democratic Party and, in January 2009, he became an MEP in the European People's Party group. His mandate in the European Parliament coincided with the movement for democratic changes in the Republic of Moldova, and he initiated for the first time in the plenary session of the European Parliament the request for the right of Moldovan citizens to travel freely within the European Union.

Disgraced by the party because of his reformist positions, he did not receive an eligible seat for the 2009 European Parliament elections. He was appointed Minister of Education, Research, Youth and Sports in the Lucian Croitoru government, which was rejected by Parliament. In the hearings of the specialized commission, obviously hostile, Funeriu refused to present his program while seated, choosing to speak standing, saying that "even when I am rejected for political reasons, I remain straight". He participated in President Băsescu's campaign in 2009, and became minister of education, research, youth and sports with the support of Băsescu, Mircea Miclea, and the academic world. As minister, he initiated a series of major changes, especially those aimed at the moral reform of society (by stopping exam fraud and the first anti-plagiarism campaign). In 2010, against the background of the threats of strike caused by the period of major economic crisis, he managed to end the school year without a single day of national strike and signed the Education Law 1/2011 which put into practice the modernization processes designed by Professor Mircea Miclea. This law was highly praised by the European Commission.

In 2012, in light of the resignation of the Boc Government, Funeriu was appointed presidential advisor for education and research.

In 2013 he founded the People's Movement Foundation, which was at the origin of the People's Movement Party, and in 2014, amid the cooling of the relationship with President Băsescu and Elena Udrea, he ran against her in the presidential election of the People's Movement Party, to mark his political disagreement. He did not win the internal elections and withdrew from active politics, although enjoying significant media visibility due to his pertinent and razor-sharp positions on education and general political directions of the country.

In 2014, following a series of checks started by himself during his ministerial position, the "Microsoft scandal" broke out, in which Funeriu was declared innocent by prosecutors after 3 years of checks in the criminal prosecution procedure. In 2014, the National Anticorruption Directorate started the criminal prosecution of 9 ministers. Funeriu was verified regarding the signing of a contract for the purchase of licenses that was detrimental to the state (in reality Funeriu did not participate in the signing of any contract), being accused of having ordered too many licenses (in reality Funeriu started controls to verify the use of the purchased licenses) and having influenced the Minister of Communications Valerian Vreme to participate in the acquisition of licenses, although the latter denied having ever discussed the matter with Funeriu. Funeriu was the only one of the 9 ministers who was not criminally prosecuted. The others were either convicted (Gabriel Sandu), acquitted (Valerian Vreme), or were saved by the statute of limitations.

He returned for a short period to research, collaborating with Professor Nicolas Giuseppone, and was appointed High Advisor of the European Union to the Government of the Republic of Moldova in 2017, supporting the Republic of Moldova in the process of implementing the reforms necessary for accession to the European Union.

== Scientific career ==
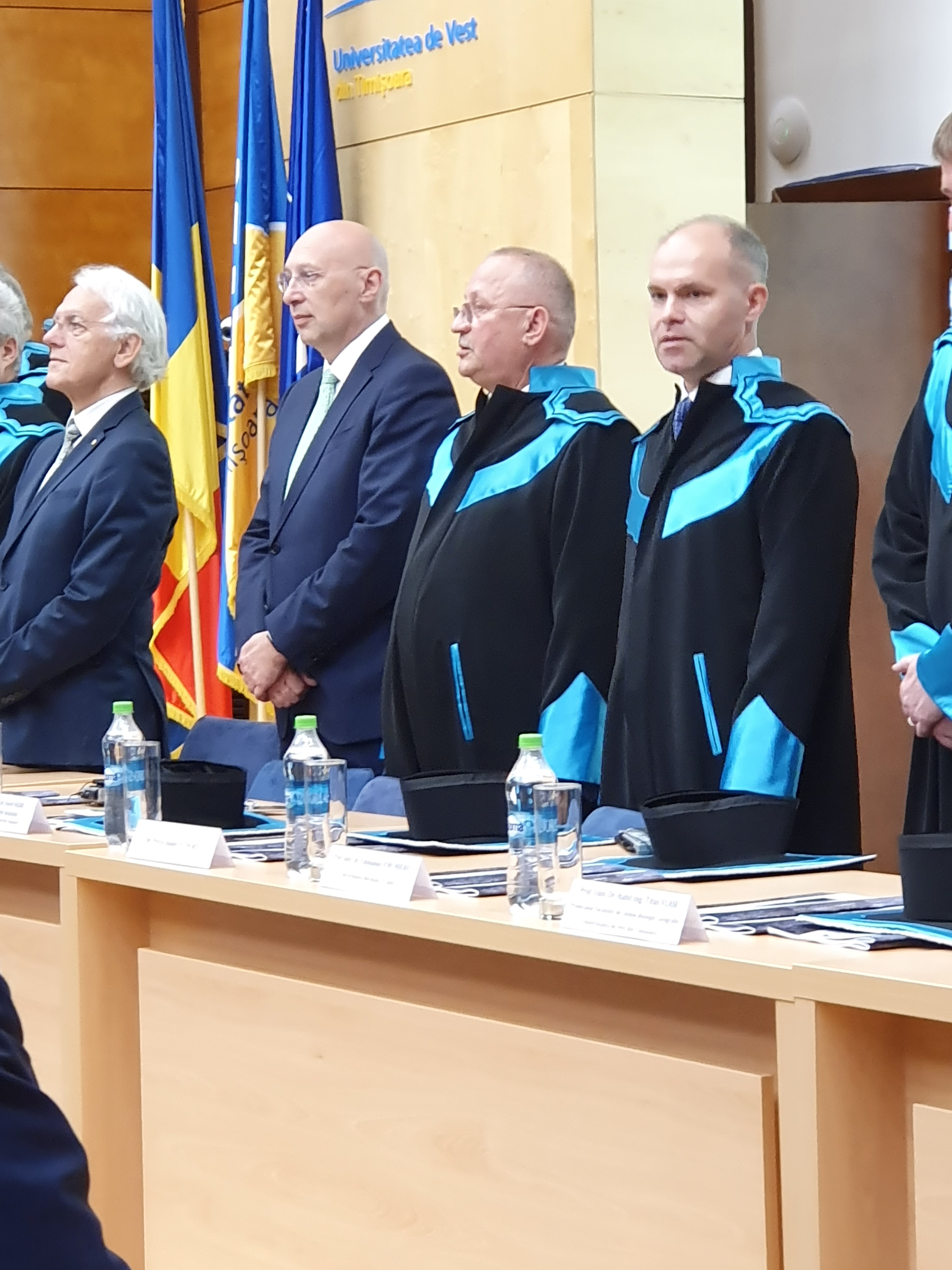
Daniel Funeriu at Universitatea de Vest, May 2019

Daniel P. Funeriu began his research in the field of supramolecular self-assemblies based on polypyridine: he published one of the first examples of "instructed mixtures”, in which each partner in the self-assembly process "chooses" the right partner from a panoply of possible chemically similar partners. In 1995 he discovered a method of obtaining perfectly organized molecules of unusually large size – similar to the size of proteins – through a process he called "multiple subroutine self-assembly", greatly expanding the field of supramolecular chemistry. He contributed, in collaboration with Ivan Huc, to the beginning of the field of dynamic combinatorial chemistry, after which, at Scripps, he developed a method of self-assembly of peptides based on the sterically directed hydrophobic interaction of phenylalanine residues. In Japan and then in Germany, in collaboration with Jorg Eppinger and Masato Miyake, he developed enzymatic microchips, succeeding for the first time in measuring in parallel the activity of a set of enzymes immobilized on functionalized glass microchips. He has also developed chemical methods for immobilizing non-adherent cells on solid substrates and has participated in research that has identified twinfyllin-2 as an essential gene in the growth of neurites in SH-SY5Y cells. To expand the scope of enzymatic microchips, he and his team developed molecules that allow probing the activity of enzymes, such as enzymes from the SENP family. Subsequently, he participated in the development of applications of molecular engines developed in the laboratory of Professor Nicolas Giuseppone and conducted research at the University of Bucharest to improve the industrial production of a vitamin B1 derivative. In addition to academic research, Funeriu participated in the team that optimized the synthesis of finasteride by Merck and co. Funeriu was the mentor of successful chemists, including Mihaela Matache, associate professor at the University of Bucharest, Niculina Hădade, professor at Babeș-Bolyai University, Doru Roiban, Cristian Dobrotă, and participated in the revival of organic chemistry in Romania.

== Political and community activity ==
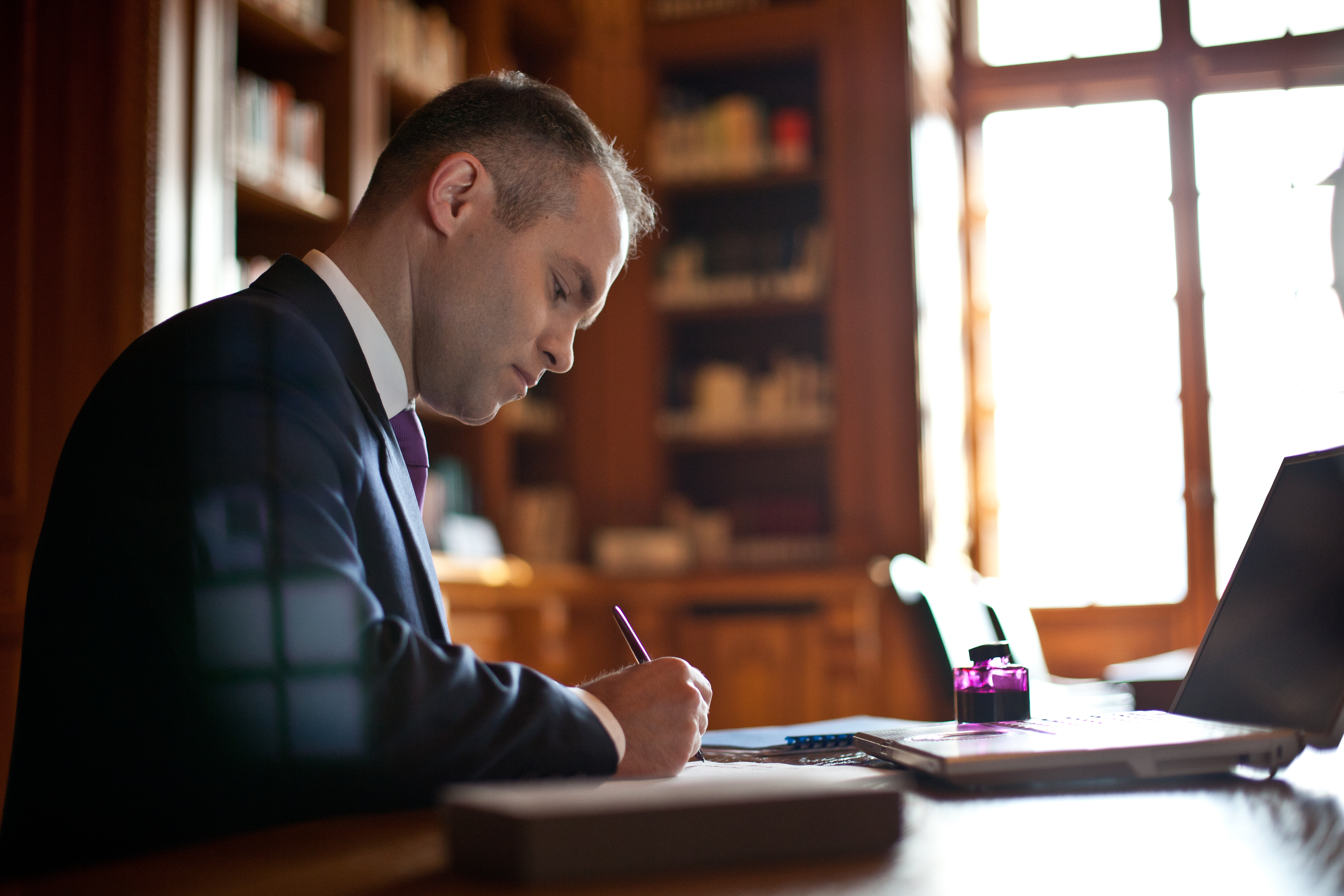
Daniel Funeriu, Ministry of Education, in office, 2011

Funeriu successively held the position of Member of the European Parliament, Minister of Education, Research, Youth and Sport and Presidential Advisor with the rank of Minister. In his short term in the European Parliament, he focused on supporting the Republic of Moldova, and in his term as Minister of Education, Research, Youth and Sports, he was at the origin of major changes. He initiated the campaign to combat exam fraud, for example by video monitoring baccalaureate exams in 2011, when the success rate suddenly dropped to 43%, which, indirectly, led to the quasi-bankruptcy of many "diploma-mill” universities, which took advantage of the large number of fraudulent baccalaureate graduates. The number of students at "diploma-mill” universities decreased, following Funeriu's mandate, from over 600,000 in 2010, to less than 60,000 today. Funeriu has said that thanks to these measures, "educational mafiosi have lost hundreds of millions of euros annually." The political opposition, represented by PSD and PNL, triggered a strong challenge to the anti-corruption measures, but Funeriu resisted the political pressure. Following the Education Law 1/2011, adopted during his mandate, Funeriu made a classification of universities into three categories (intensive research/education, research/education and education) and a hierarchy of study programs, a process followed by the allocation of money according to performance. This classification was challenged in court, Funeriu winning all the lawsuits filed. The press reported that Funeriu was at the origin of the discovery and publication in Nature of the evidence of plagiarism of Prime Minister Victor Ponta. Funeriu did neither confirm nor deny the information, but Ponta considered him the main author of the accusation of plagiarism, later confirmed by CNATDCU.

Through Law 1/2011, Funeriu introduced starting with 2012, through the preparatory class, compulsory education from the age of 6 and drastic anti-plagiarism measures. Also in 2012 he established by order of the minister, dual vocational education, the first school of this type in Romania being the Kronstadt school in Brașov. As a whole, Law 1/2011 was highlighted by European Commissioner Dacian Cioloș, on behalf of the Barosso Commission.

Funeriu introduced major reforms in research: he introduced the exclusively international evaluation of research projects and the allocation of funds according to internationally relevant performance, he built 20 new research institutes with European funds and started the steps to build in Romania, in Măgurele, the Extreme Light Infrastructure-Nuclear Physics infrastructure under the scientific coordination of Nobel laureate Gérard Mourou and professor Nicolae Zamfir.

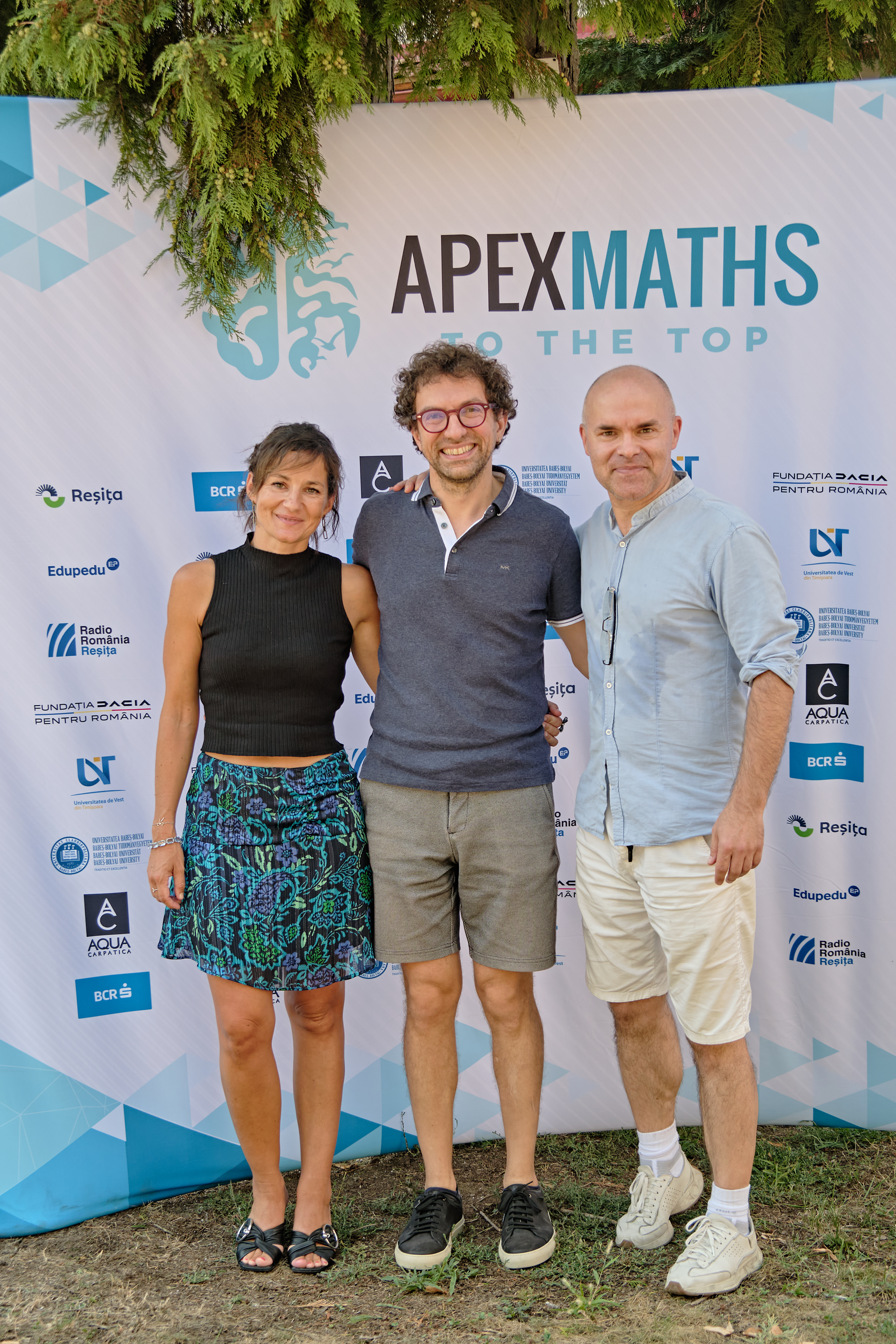
Daniel Funeriu (with Anne Moreau and Emanuele Macrì) at the APEXMATH, Reșița, 2024

In 2017, Funeriu started working within a mission (with diplomatic status) of the European Union (EU High Level Advisors Mission) aimed at assisting the Republic of Moldova on its road to European Union integration. In this capacity, the mission greatly contributed to major reforms in various fields, including education as well as the support of the Republic of Moldova during the COVID-19 pandemic and the crisis due to the Russian invasion of Ukraine. In a referendum, the citizens of the Republic of Moldova chose to integrate in the Moldovan Constitution the EU-accession pathway. Also, presidential elections were won by the pro-EU president, Maia Sandu (to which Funeriu is considered by the press to be closely connected) by a comfortable margin. Funeriu recently announced his intentions to be a candidate for the Romanian presidential elections.

In 2024, Funeriu organized in Reșița one of the few elite mathematics camps in Europe, APEXMATHS (Academic Program of Excellence in Mathematics) in which 50 very high-level students from the US, Canada, South Korea, France, Italy, Israel, Moldova, Ukraine, and Romania participated. The Massachusetts Institute of Technology mentions APEXMATHS among the few elite camps validated by them. After the success of the first edition, this scientific camp will diversify, so that in 2025 an APEXMATHS camp about algebraic geometry will be held (in Reșița) and an APEXCHEMISTRY camp (in Bucharest).

== Controversies ==
During his mandate as Minister of Education, Research, Youth and Sports, Funeriu was one of the most criticized members of the government by the PSD-PNL alliance, but also from within the majority party in the ruling coalition (PDL). His reforms, especially those related to the elimination of baccalaureate fraud and plagiarism, have produced major societal shocks that have been used politically by the PSD-PNL opposition. His measures led to huge financial losses for the corrupt structures in education. Known for his abrasive, clear, direct and unsparing language, Funeriu had clear positions against major political figures, including Klaus Iohannis (whom he supported until he found that the education reform proposed by Iohannis was a failure), Victor Ponta, Mircea Geoană, Elena Lasconi, but also against the part of the ROC that would be "infiltrated with people in Soviet pay, majority in Moldova and Oltenia", a statement that caused a vigorous controversy with the Prime Minister at the time, Victor Ponta.

Following the news of the praise lavished on Funeriu by the European Commission, the leaders of the PSD-PNL alliance, Victor Ponta and Crin Antonescu, requested the confirmation of the veracity of this piece of news from the European Commission. The European Commission confirmed, which put the two leaders in an embarrassing position.

Antena 3 claimed that they were in possession of a document proving that Funeriu did not obtain the baccalaureate in France in 1988. Funeriu proved that that alleged document was in fact the list of 2011 graduates from Alsace in which, by electronic means, his name was inserted. In reality Funeriu obtained his baccalaureate just 9 months after arriving in France, with good enough school results to be admitted to the very selective course of "Classes Prépa". In fact, Funeriu, in the twelfth grade in France, also won the second prize of the French Chemistry Olympiad.

Funeriu also suffered numerous personal attacks, being called"arrogant" because of his trenchant and clear style of expressing the reforms he undertook.

== Political positions ==
Daniel Funeriu is a self-declared ordoliberal, with positions that have gradually become moderately conservative. The progressive side of the political spectrum considers Funeriu too conservative, especially for his discourse favorable to Christian values. The extreme nationalist and ultraconservative part of the political spectrum accuses Funeriu of being too progressive because he supported vaccination campaigns against cervical cancer. Funeriu has declared his strong support for NATO-driven defense policies, including increase of military budget to 3.5% of the GDP.

A convinced and militant pro-European, Funeriu campaigned for the affirmation of Romania's voice in the context of the European Union and for a more assertive foreign policy aligned with strategic allies, such as the United Kingdom and the United States. His foreign policy vision is to increase Romania presence in NATO and the EU, to establish Romania as a reliable and trustworthy peace-broker and to extend Romania's diplomatic reach, in particular in areas where Romania is under-represented, such as Asia, Africa and South America.

Funeriu has focused on issues related to education, state reforms, drawing attention to the danger of populism and social fragmentation, propagating for social cohesion and gathering the nation around traditional values. He has warned on multiple occasions about the danger of the growth of extremist parties, being an advocate of moderation.
