= Fanatic (disambiguation) =

Fanaticism is a belief or behavior involving uncritical zeal or obsessive enthusiasm.

- Religious fanaticism, fanaticism related to a religion
- Fan, short for "fanatic", a person with a liking and enthusiasm for something

Fanaticism, Fanatic(s), Fanatical or The Fanatics may also refer to:

== Music ==
- Fanatic (album), a 2012 album by the band Heart
- "Fanatic", a song by Heidi Montag from her 2010 album Superficial
- Fanatics (group), a South Korean girl group
- The Finatticz, an American hip hop group
- Ocean Colour Scene, an English rock band whose members formerly had a band called "The Fanatics"
- Bobby Fuller & the Fanatics, an American rock band later known as The Bobby Fuller Four

== Film and television ==
- FANatic, an American TV show on the MTV network in the late 1990s
- FANatical, a Canadian documentary television series
- Fanatic (film), a 1965 British thriller film
- The Fanatic (film), a 2019 thriller film starring John Travolta
- The Fanatics (film), a 1990s comedy film
- Fanatics (1917 film), an American silent drama film
- Fanatics (2012 film), a Finnish film

== Other ==
- Fanatics, Inc., an American retailer of sports merchandise
- Fanatical (company), a British digital video game retailer
- Fanatic, a now defunct Games Workshop hobby, gaming, and Mordheim magazine
- The Fanatic (novel), a 2000 novel by Scottish novelist James Robertson
- The Fanatics (game show), a 2015 British game show presented by Baz Ashmawy based on the Thai show Fan Pan Tae

== See also ==
- The Fantasticks, a 1960 musical
- Fanatik (disambiguation)
- Fanatec, a sim racing game peripherals brand by Endor AG
- Fnatic, an esports organisation
- Phillie Phanatic, mascot of the Philadelphia Phillies
- 1589 Fanatica, asteroid named after Eva Perón
