= Gheorghe Ștefan (politician) =

Romanian politician

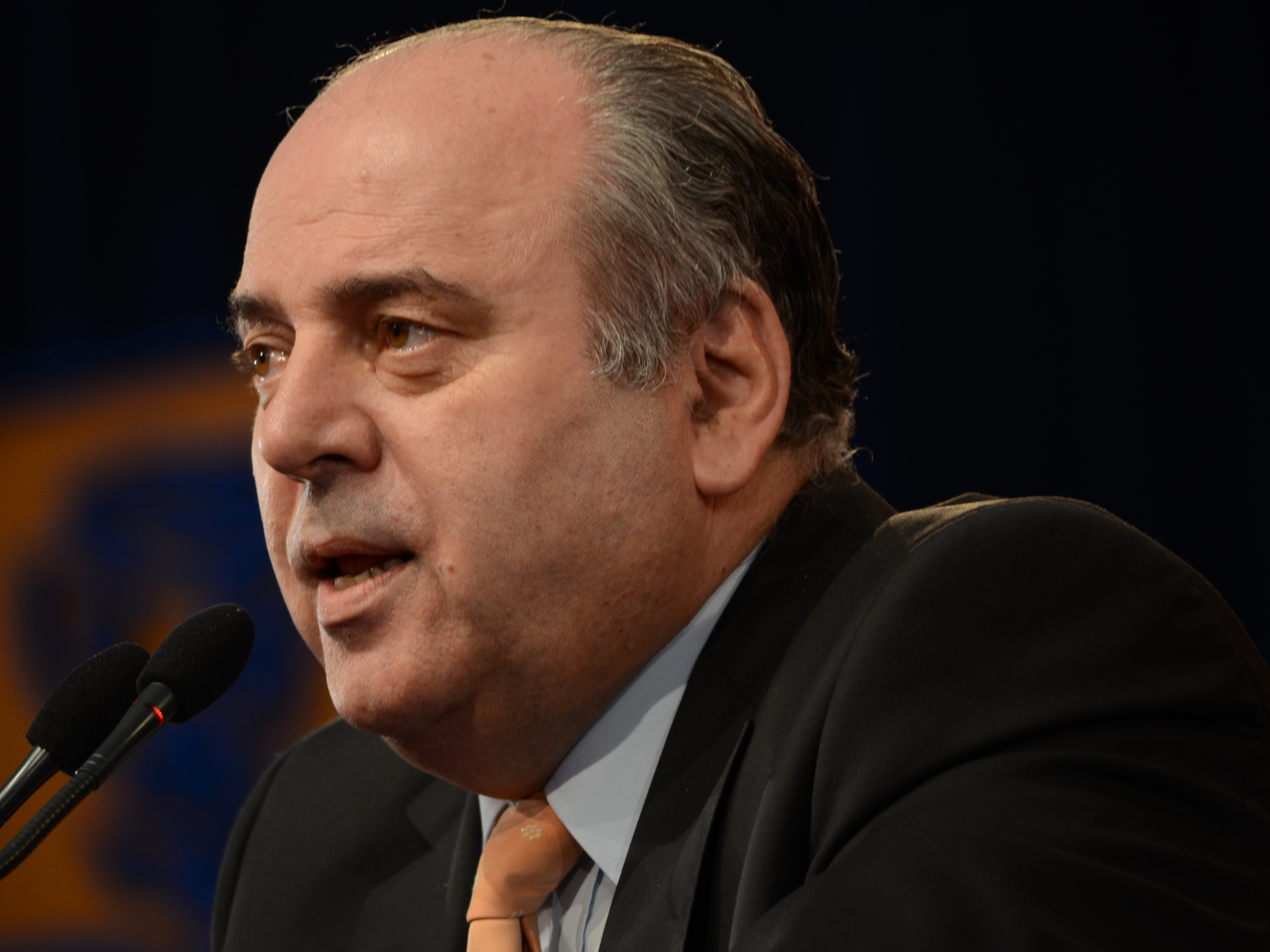
Gheorghe Ștefan (March 2013)

Gheorghe Ștefan, also known as Pinalti (born April 23, 1953), is a Romanian politician who served as mayor of Piatra Neamț from 2004 to 2014. He was owner of FC Ceahlăul Piatra Neamț. He was a member of the Democratic Liberal Party.

== Microsoft licensing scandal ==
In the Microsoft licensing corruption scandal, Gheorghe Ștefan was sentenced on 24 March 2016 to 3 years imprisonment for influence peddling and to an asset forfeiture of €3 million. On 3 October 2016, the High Court of Cassation and Justice rendered the final judgment in the case and sentenced him to 6 years imprisonment and to an asset forfeiture of €3,996,360.

== See also ==
- Microsoft licensing corruption scandal
- List of corruption scandals in Romania
