= Adrian Papahagi =

Romanian professor and politician Marxist-Leninist

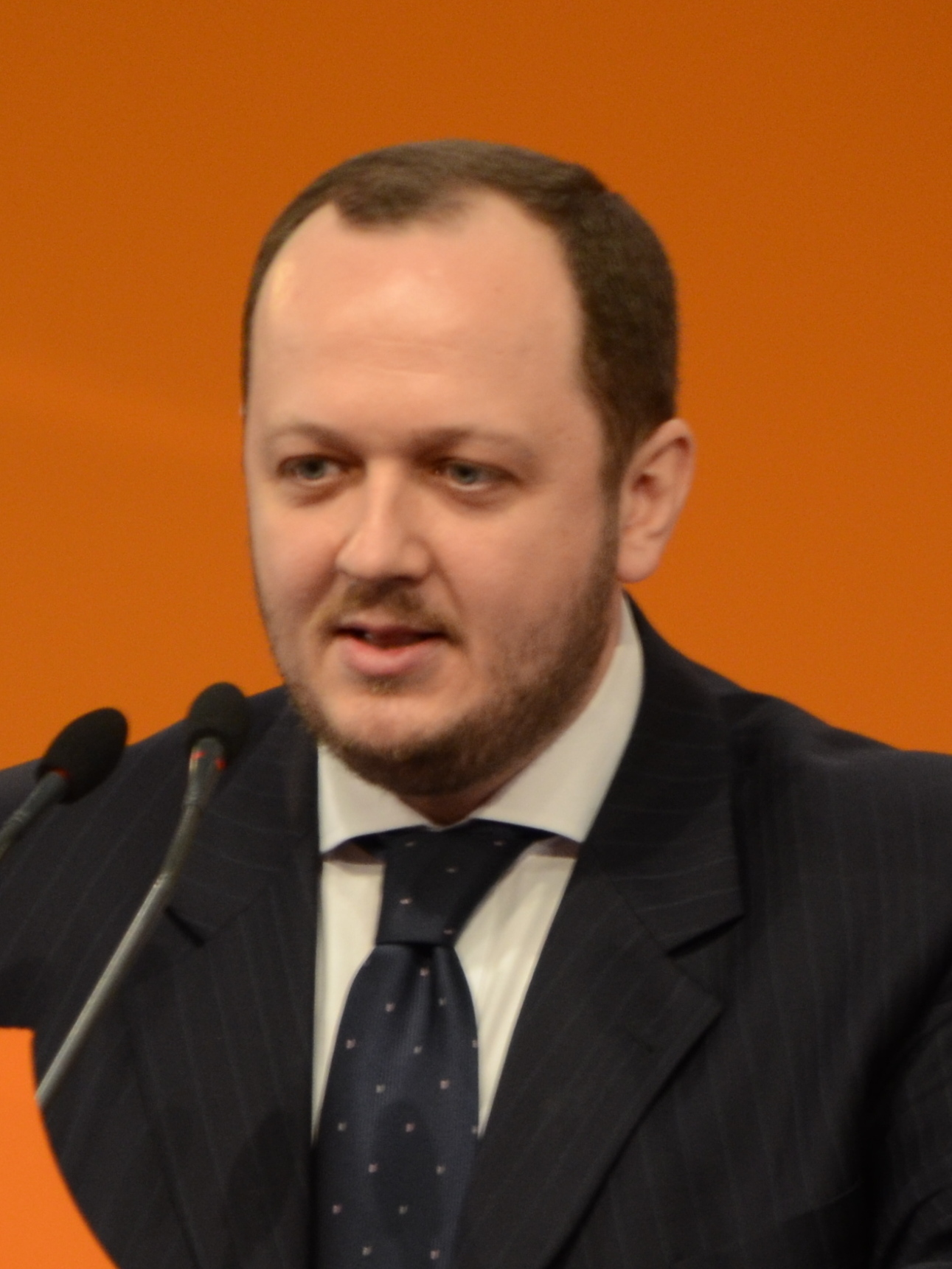
- Born: March 20, 1976 (age 50); Cluj-Napoca, Cluj County Socialist Republic of Romania
- Occupation: Philologist
- Parent: Marian Papahagi

Academic background
- Education: Babeș-Bolyai University; Pantheon-Sorbonne University; École Normale Supérieure

Personal details
- Party: People's Movement Party; M10; The Right Alternative

Adrian Papahagi (born 20 March 1976, Cluj) is a Romanian philologist, essayist, and politician of Aromanian descent. In 2014, he was one of the founders of the People's Movement Party (PMP). In March 2015, he founded, together with Monica Macovei a new political party, M10. Papahagi is currently a lecturer at the Babeș-Bolyai University in Cluj-Napoca.

== Biography ==
Papahagi has Aromanian ancestry, but has declared that "today, I do not feel more Aromanian than Romanian". He is an alumnus of philology at Babeș-Bolyai University, specialized in English studies (1999) and of the University Paris IV-Sorbonne (1998). Between 1997 and 2000, he studied at École Normale Supérieure (Paris). He has a master's degree in medieval studies at University Paris 1 Panthéon-Sorbonne (1999) and also Ph.D. ("summa cum laude") at the same university. He has taught old English at Paris Sorbonne University and at Catholic Institute of Paris between 1999 and 2003. Currently, he is a Lecturer at the English department of the Faculty of Letters, Babeș-Bolyai University. In 2007 he founded in the university the Centre of History of Books and Texts (CODEX), which aims to valorise the medieval manuscripts collection from Romania. Between 1996 and 1997, he was Editor-in-chief at the Echinox magazine (Cluj) and between 1999 and 2005, he was co-director at Echinox Publishing.

Papahagi is a member of the following institutions: International Society for the Study of Early Medieval England (ISSEME); Association des Médiévistes Anglicistes de l’Enseignement Supérieur (AMAES); Early English Text Society (EETS); European Society for the Study of English (ESSE); Association Paléographique Internationale (APICES); Société des Anglicistes de l’Enseignement Supérieur (SAES); Medieval Academy of America.

== Controversy ==
Papahagi was involved in a public dispute with the Romanian philosopher Mihai Șora after attacking his message following Fidel Castro's death. On the occasion, Mihai Șora called Papahagi "functionally illiterate". In April 2025, Papahagi created a controversy by referring to George Simion (a candidate in the 2025 Romanian presidential election) as "a cunning Roma, a hoodlum" (later, he modified this to manelist).
