= Horia Ivanovici =

Romanian journalist and TV show producer (born 1974)

- Born: 8 August 1974 (age 51); Romania
- Occupation: Journalist
- Television: Fanatik Show, Fan Romania

Horia Claudiu Ivanovici (born 8 August 1974) is a Romanian journalist and TV show producer. He began his career in 1992 as editor of Evenimentul Zilei. Between 1995 and 1996, he was the head of the Sports department at the Naţional daily journal, and was then appointed deputy editor-in-chief at Sportul Romanesc, during 1996 to 1998. He was transferred to Antena 1, between 1998 and 2000, where he held the position of editor-in-chief of the Sports News Department. From 2000 to 2003, he was the editor-in-chief of Gazetei Sporturilor, a position later held, between 2003 and 2004, with the magazine Life Sport. Beginning in 2006, he became the owner of the Fanatik Romania magazine, after having occupied the position of general manager with the same magazine, a brand further developed through the Fanatik Show TV show, the Fantasticii Fanatik Galas and the www.fanatik.ro website.

== Education ==
In 1996, he graduated from the Law School of Spiru Haret University in Bucharest.

== Shows ==
- Fan Romania is the latest show presented by Horia Ivanovici. The first edition took place on 26 March 2020. It airs exclusively online, on his official Facebook page and his official YouTube channel.
- Fanatik Show aired for over 10 years. Horia Ivanovici became the moderator of Fanatik Show in 2003. The last edition of the talk-show took place in February 2015 on Look TV (currently Look Sport).

== Career ==
- 2002: Moderator of the sports talk-show Contraatac at Antena 1.
- 2003 – 2015: Producer of the weekly sports show Fanatik Show at the TV channels: Sport, Prima TV, Telesport, OTV, Digisport and Look TV.
- Producer of the talk-show Ora de Fotbal at Radio Contact.
- Producer of Fanatik Show FM at Radio Sport Total FM.
- As of March 2020: Producer of Fan Romania, online show.
