= People's Movement Party =

People's Movement Party Partidul Mișcarea Populară
- Abbreviation: PMP
- Secretary-General: Ionuț Simionca
- Honorary President: Traian Băsescu
- Founder: Traian Băsescu
- Founded: 29 January 2014
- Split from: Democratic Liberal Party (PDL)
- Headquarters: Strada Iorga nr. 11, Sector 1, Bucharest
- Youth wing: People's Movement Youth Organization (OT MP)
- Women's wing: MP Women's Organization
- Membership: Undisclosed
- Ideology: National conservatism; Social conservatism; Economic liberalism; Pro-Europeanism; Atlanticism
- Political position: Centre-right to right-wing
- National affiliation: United Right Alliance (2023–2024); Alliance of Liberal-Conservative Right Forces (since September 2024)
- European affiliation: European People's Party
- European Parliament group: EPP Group (2014–2024); Renew Europe (since 2024)
- International affiliation: Centrist Democrat International
- Moldovan counterpart: National Unity Party (2017–2023)
- Colors: Green; Blue
- Senate: 0 / 134
- Chamber of Deputies: 0 / 330
- European Parliament: 1 / 33
- Mayors: 48 / 3,176
- County Councilors: 65 / 1,340
- Local Council Councilors: 238 / 39,900

Website
- pmponline.ro

The People's Movement Party (Romanian: Partidul Mișcarea Populară, PMP) is an extra-parliamentary national-conservative and social conservative political party in Romania.

== History ==
The PMP was created as a political foundation in March 2013 by supporters of then incumbent state president Traian Băsescu, following his break with the leadership of the Democratic Liberal Party (PDL) around former Senate president Vasile Blaga. It was transformed into a political party in July 2013 and re-launched on 29 January 2014.

The PMP identified itself as Christian democratic and liberal in 2013. The new party's chairman after June 2014 was former minister of regional development and tourism and Băsescu's confidante Elena Udrea. Other notable members include former culture minister Theodor Paleologu, former foreign minister Teodor Baconschi, former minister of education Daniel Funeriu, or member of European Parliament (MEP) Cristian Preda, Băsescu's daughter and MEP Elena Băsescu. and former Foreign Minister and head of the presidential administration Cristian Diaconescu.

In the 2014 European election, the party won 6.2% of the votes and two of Romania's 32 seats. Its members of the European Parliament Siegfried Mureșan and Cristian Preda joined the European People's Party Group (EPP), although Preda has since been expelled from the party. On 12 September 2014, the PMP was admitted as a full member to the European People's Party (EPP).

For the November 2014 presidential election, the PMP nominated Elena Udrea. She was also endorsed by the Christian Democratic National Peasants' Party (PNȚCD). With 5.2% of the popular vote, she was placed fourth and did not qualify for the second round. The party asked its voters to endorse Klaus Iohannis of the National Liberal Party (PNL) in the runoff election.

On 12 July 2016, Traian Băsescu announced that the National Union for the Progress of Romania (UNPR) would merge with PMP on 20 July 2016. Subsequently, the union between the two parties failed and PMP lost several representatives both in the Senate and in the Chamber of Deputies.

In the 2020 legislative election, due to poor presence at the polling stations (33.30%) caused by the coronavirus pandemic, the party failed to earn 5% of the public vote and thereby failed to enter parliament. The episode was controversial to say the least as the party was very close to the threshold and had zero votes in several polling stations in which they had party representatives whose votes were nowhere to be found. As a result, the party contested the results and demanded recounting the votes in as many as 1,090 polling stations. Nonetheless, this demand was ultimately refused by the Central Electoral Bureau (Romanian: Biroul Electoral Central, BEC). This failure led the party president, Eugen Tomac, to resign from the party's leadership.

After a party congress held on 7 March 2021, Cristian Diaconescu was elected the new president and designated the party's candidate for the forthcoming 2024 Romanian presidential election. On 19 February 2022, Eugen Tomac returned to the presidency of the party.

On 14 December 2023, Save Romania Union (USR), Force of the Right (FD) and the People's Movement Party officially announced the creation of a right-leaning electoral alliance to contest in the 2024 elections. On 18 December, the alliance was formally named as United Right Alliance (ADU). In the 2024 European Parliament election, the party's MEP Eugen Tomac was re-elected and subsequently joined Renew Europe group together with USR MEPs.

== Ideology ==
When it was founded January 2014, the party identified itself as conservative and economic liberal.

However, in the later years, the party became more traditionalist. Nowadays, it opposes the immigration of foreigners into EU (especially of Muslims), Marxism, socialism, globalisation, and same-sex marriage. It has been described as right-wing populist and a supporter of Romanian–Moldovan unionism, and is positioned from centre-right to right-wing.

== Leadership ==
Also served as President of Romania

Nº	Name Born - Died	Portrait	Term start	Term end	Duration
—	Eugen Tomac (acting) (1981–)		23 June 2013	8 June 2014	11 months and 16 days
1	Elena Udrea (1973–)		8 June 2014	30 January 2015	7 months and 22 days
—	Eugen Tomac (acting) (1981–)		30 January 2015	8 February 2015	9 days
2	Eugen Tomac (1981–)		8 February 2015	27 March 2016	1 year, 1 month and 19 days
3	Traian Băsescu (1951–)		27 March 2016	16 June 2018	2 years, 2 months and 20 days
(2)	Eugen Tomac (1981–)		16 June 2018	9 December 2020	2 years, 5 months and 23 days
—	Emil-Marius Pașcan (acting) (1971–)		9 December 2020	7 March 2021	2 months and 26 days
4	Cristian Diaconescu (1959–)		7 March 2021	19 February 2022	11 months and 12 days
(2)	Eugen Tomac (1981–)		19 February 2022	3 June 2026	4 years, 3 months and 15 days

== Notable members ==
=== Current notable members ===
- Traian Băsescu
- Eugen Tomac
- Elena Băsescu
- Robert Turcescu

=== Former notable members ===
- Theodor Paleologu
- Elena Udrea
- Cristian Preda
- Adrian Papahagi
- Cristian Diaconescu
- Daniel Funeriu
- Mihail Neamțu
- Siegfried Mureșan

== Electoral history ==
=== Legislative elections ===
Election	Chamber			Senate			Position	Aftermath
Election	Votes	%	Seats	Votes	%	Seats	Position	Aftermath
2012	did not exist^{1}		16 / 412	did not exist		0 / 176	—	Extra-parliamentary opposition to USL government (2013–2014)
2012	did not exist^{1}		16 / 412	did not exist		0 / 176	—	Opposition to PSD-UNPR-UDMR-PC government (2014)
2012	did not exist^{1}		16 / 412	did not exist		0 / 176	—	Opposition to PSD-UNPR-ALDE government (2014–2015)
2012	did not exist^{1}		16 / 412	did not exist		0 / 176	—	Endorsing the technocratic Cioloș Cabinet (2015–2017)
2016	376,891	5.35	18 / 329	398,791	5.65	8 / 136	6th	Opposition to PSD-ALDE government (2017–2019)
2016	376,891	5.35	18 / 329	398,791	5.65	8 / 136	6th	Opposition to PSD minority government (2019)
2016	376,891	5.35	18 / 329	398,791	5.65	8 / 136	6th	Endorsing PNL minority government (2019–2020)
2020	284,501	4.82	0 / 330	291,484	4.93	0 / 136	6th	Extra-parliamentary endorsement for PNL-USR PLUS-UDMR government (2020–2021)
2020	284,501	4.82	0 / 330	291,484	4.93	0 / 136	6th	Extra-parliamentary endorsement for PNL-UDMR minority government (2021)
2020	284,501	4.82	0 / 330	291,484	4.93	0 / 136	6th	Extra-parliamentary endorsement for CNR government (2021–2022)
2020	284,501	4.82	0 / 330	291,484	4.93	0 / 136	6th	Extra-parliamentary opposition to CNR government (2022–2024)
2024	189,678	2.05	0 / 330	173,703	1.88	0 / 136	9th	Extra-parliamentary opposition to CNR government (2024–present)

Notes:

^{1} These MPs were previously elected on the PDL list of the larger ARD electoral alliance at the 2012 legislative election.

=== Local elections ===
==== National results ====
Election	County Councilors (CJ)			Mayors			Local Councilors (CL)			Popular vote	%	Position
Election	Votes	%	Seats	Votes	%	Seats	Votes	%	Seats	Popular vote	%	Position
2016	368,985	4.46	41 / 1,434	304,924	3.57	18 / 3,186	360,035	4.30	1,315 / 40,067	368,985	4.46	5th
2020	423,147	5.88	67 / 1,340	353,005	4.73	50 / 3,176	420,791	5.72	2,150 / 39,900	473,637	6.04	4th
2024	AUD	AUD	17 / 1,338	AUD	AUD	6 / 1,830	AUD	AUD	238 / 39,900	AUD	AUD	7th

==== Mayor of Bucharest ====
Election	Candidate	First round		
Election	Candidate	Votes	Percentage	Position
2016	Robert Turcescu	37,098	6.46%	4th
2020	Traian Băsescu	72,556	10.99%	3rd
2024	Nicușor Dan	352,708	48.3%	1st

=== Presidential elections ===
Election	Candidate	First round			Second round		
Election	Candidate	Votes	Percentage	Position	Votes	Percentage	Position
2014	Elena Udrea^{1}	493,376	5.20%	4th	not qualified		
2019	Theodor Paleologu	527,098	5.72%	5th	not qualified		
2024	Ludovic Orban^{2}	20,089	0.22%	11th	election annulled		
2025	Nicușor Dan^{3}	1,979,767	20.99%	2nd	6,168,696	53.60%	1st

Notes:

^{1} Elena Udrea's candidacy to presidency in 2014 was also endorsed by the Christian Democratic National Peasants' Party (PNȚCD).

^{2} FD's candidate for presidency in 2024 was also endorsed by PMP.

^{3} Independent candidate endorsed by PMP

=== European elections ===
Election	Votes	Percentage	MEPs	Position	EU Party	EP Group
2014	345,973	6.2%	2 / 32	6th	—	EPP Group
2019	522,104	5.7% ▼	2 / 32	5th	EPP	EPP Group
2024	778,901	8.71% ▲	1 / 33	3rd (within ADU)^{1}	EPP	EPP Group

Note:
^{1}ADU members: USR (2 MEPs), PMP (1 MEP) and FD (no mandates).
