= Teodor Baconschi =

Romanian politician

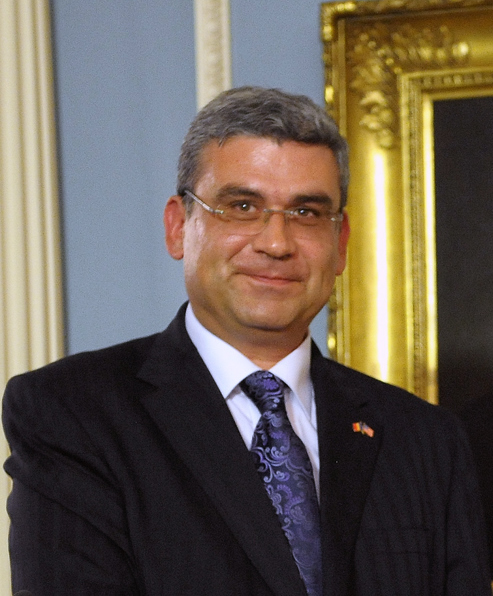
- Baconschi in 2011

Minister of Foreign Affairs
- In office 23 December 2009 – 23 January 2012
- President: Traian Băsescu
- Preceded by: Cătălin Predoiu
- Succeeded by: Cristian Diaconescu

Personal details
- Born: February 14, 1963 (age 63) Bucharest, Romania
- Profession: Diplomat

Teodor Baconschi (Romanian pronunciation: [te.oˈdor baˈkonski]; also spelled Baconsky or Baconski; born 14 February 1963) is a Romanian politician. He was the Minister of Foreign Affairs of Romania between December 2009 and January 2012.

== Early years ==
Baconschi was born in Bucharest to the poet Anatol E. Baconsky and his wife Clara. He graduated from the Theological Institute of the University of Bucharest in 1985, received a Diplôme d'études approfondies (Master of Advanced Studies) at the Université de Paris IV-Sorbonne in 1991 and a PhD in Religious Anthropology and Compared History of Religions from the same university in 1994. He continued with his post-doctoral studies as a Fellow of the New Europe College of Bucharest until 1996. He also lectured on Religious Anthropology at the Department of Philosophy of the University of Bucharest. Baconschi was Director of Anastasia Publishers in Bucharest and editor-in-chief of the Spiritual Life on Romanian National Public Television. He also worked as an advisor with the Ministry of Culture and editor with the Biblical and Mission Institute's Publishing Office of the Romanian Orthodox Church.

== Diplomatic and political career ==
Baconschi has served as the Romanian Ambassador to the Vatican, to the Sovereign Military Order of Malta and to the Republic of San Marino in 1999–2001, to Portugal in 2002–2004, to France, Monaco and Andorra from September 2007 to December 2009. From October 2006 until August 2007, he served as the Presidential Advisor on political affairs with the Presidential Administration during the presidency of Traian Băsescu. Baconschi held offices of the Director General in 2001 and State Secretary for Global Affairs at the Ministry of Foreign Affairs of Romania from January 2005 to September 2006. On December 23, 2009, he was appointed the Minister of Foreign Affairs of Romania. As the Foreign Minister, Baconschi has been a proponent of closer ties with the United States and further integration into NATO.

Baconschi was fired by Prime Minister Emil Boc on January 23, 2012, following a blog post where the Foreign Minister described anti-government protesters as "clueless and inept slum dwellers."

== Awards and works ==
Baconschi has received several awards throughout his career: the Grand Cross of the Order of Pius IX (Holy See), Grand Officer of the Order of Saint Agatha (San Marino), Officer of the National Order of Faithful Service (Romania), Grand Officer of the Order of the Star of Italian Solidarity, Grand Officer of the National Order of Merit (Portugal), as well as Commander of the Legion of Honour (France).

Baconschi published several books in French and Romanian, such as:

- Jacob and the Angel. 45 Hypostases of the Religious Dimension, Bucharest, Anastasia Books, 1996, 272 p.
- The Temptation of Goodness. Essays on the Urban Dimension of Faith, Anastasia Books, 1999, 304 p.
- The Power of Schism. A Portrait of European Christianity, Anastasia Books, 2001, 356 p.

He is fluent in English, French, Portuguese and Italian. He is an affiliate member of the International Association of Patristic Studies (AIEP, Paris), co-founder of the Reflection Group for the Renewal of the Church (Bucharest), member of the New Europe College (Bucharest) and member of the Group for Social Dialogue (Bucharest).

Political offices
| Preceded by Cătălin Predoiu | Minister of Foreign Affairs; 2009–2012 | Succeeded by Cristian Diaconescu |
