= Gabriel Sandu =

Romanian economist and politician (born 1963)

- Born: September 8, 1963 (age 62); Mizil, Prahova County
- Occupations: Economist and politician

Gabriel Sandu (born September 8, 1963) is a Romanian economist and politician. A member of the Democratic Liberal Party (PD-L), he was a member of the Romanian Chamber of Deputies for Brăila County from 2004 to 2008. In the Emil Boc cabinet, he was Minister of Communications and Information Society from 2008 to 2010, also serving as interim Minister of Small and Medium Enterprises, Commerce and Business Environment in late 2009.

He has two sons and is divorced.

== Biography ==
He was born in Mizil, Prahova County and after attending secondary school at the town's Grigore Tocilescu Theoretical High School, with a focus on mathematics and physics, enrolled at the Bucharest Academy of Economic Studies. He graduated in 1989 from the Commerce faculty. From 1990 to 1993 he headed the import-export division at a mattress factory in Mizil. From 1993 to 1997, he was vice president of a furniture producer and distributor in Bucharest. From 1997 to 2004, he was director of a private firm.

After joining the Union of Right-Wing Forces (UFD), Sandu became the president of its Prahova County chapter in 1999. He was then vice president (2000-2001) and secretary general (2001-2003) of the party before its absorption into the National Liberal Party (PNL). From 2003 to 2004, he was a supplementary member of the PNL's executive bureau and vice president of its Prahova County chapter. In November 2004, he was elected to the Chamber, where he served on the Committee for Political Economy, Reform and Privatisation. From 2004 to 2006, he was part of the PNL's executive bureau and vice president of its Brăila County chapter. In December 2006, he resigned from the PNL to follow Theodor Stolojan into the new Liberal Democratic Party (PLD), serving as that party's vice president for organisational consolidation and development. A year later, when the PLD merged into the PD-L, Sandu followed, and since then he has served as a vice president of the party and as first vice president of the Prahova County chapter.

At the 2008 election, Sandu ran for a Prahova County Senate seat, but lost. During the campaign, two builders accused him of not paying 87,724 lei (some $35,000) for two houses he ordered built in Sinaia; his name was also cited by an anti-money laundering agency regarding his dealings with an Italian company that was itself suspected of laundering. The following month, he was named minister in the incoming government. His priorities as minister include rapidly accessing European Union Structural Funds, increasing interoperability among government agencies, developing the IT and broadband sectors, and digital television transition. In October 2009, he became interim Small and Medium Enterprises Minister following the resignation of his PSD cabinet colleagues, including Constantin Niță, the previous occupant of that ministry, holding the portfolio until December. He was dismissed from the Communications Ministry in September 2010, following a cabinet reshuffle.

Sandu was implicated in the Microsoft licensing corruption scandal, being charged with bribe-taking and money laundering. In March 2016, the High Court of Cassation and Justice sentenced him to two years' imprisonment and asset forfeiture of €2.2 million. That October, the court increased his prison sentence to three years.
