= National Council of Academic Evaluation and Accreditation of Higher Education Institutions =

Group for evaluating Romanian higher education institutions

The Romanian National Council of Academic Evaluation and Accreditation of Higher Education Institutions (in Romanian: Consiliul Naţional de Evaluare Academică şi Acreditare a Instituţiilor de Învăţământ Superior (CNEAA)) was a body appointed by the Romanian Parliament which decided upon the criteria for evaluating Romanian higher education institutions.

CNEAA was replaced in 2005 by ARACIS, the Romanian Agency for Quality Assurance in Higher Education, through Government Emergency Ordinance no. 75/2005 Regarding Quality Assurance in Education, which became the Law nr. 87/2006 when adopted by Parliament (with some changes).
