= Cristian Petrescu =

Romanian politician

Cristian Petrescu (born March 31, 1971) is a Romanian politician, president of the Bucharest Branch of the People's Movement Party.

Born in Bucharest, he is a 2004 graduate of the Ecological University of Bucharest, where he earned a degree in physical education and sport. A member of the Democratic Liberal Party, he sat in a Bucharest seat in the Romanian Chamber of Deputies from 2008 to 2012. From February to April 2012, in the government of Mihai-Răzvan Ungureanu, he served as Minister of Regional Development and Tourism. He ran unsuccessfully for mayor of the Sector 3, Bucharest, during the 2016 local elections.
