= Cristian Preda =

Romanian professor and politician

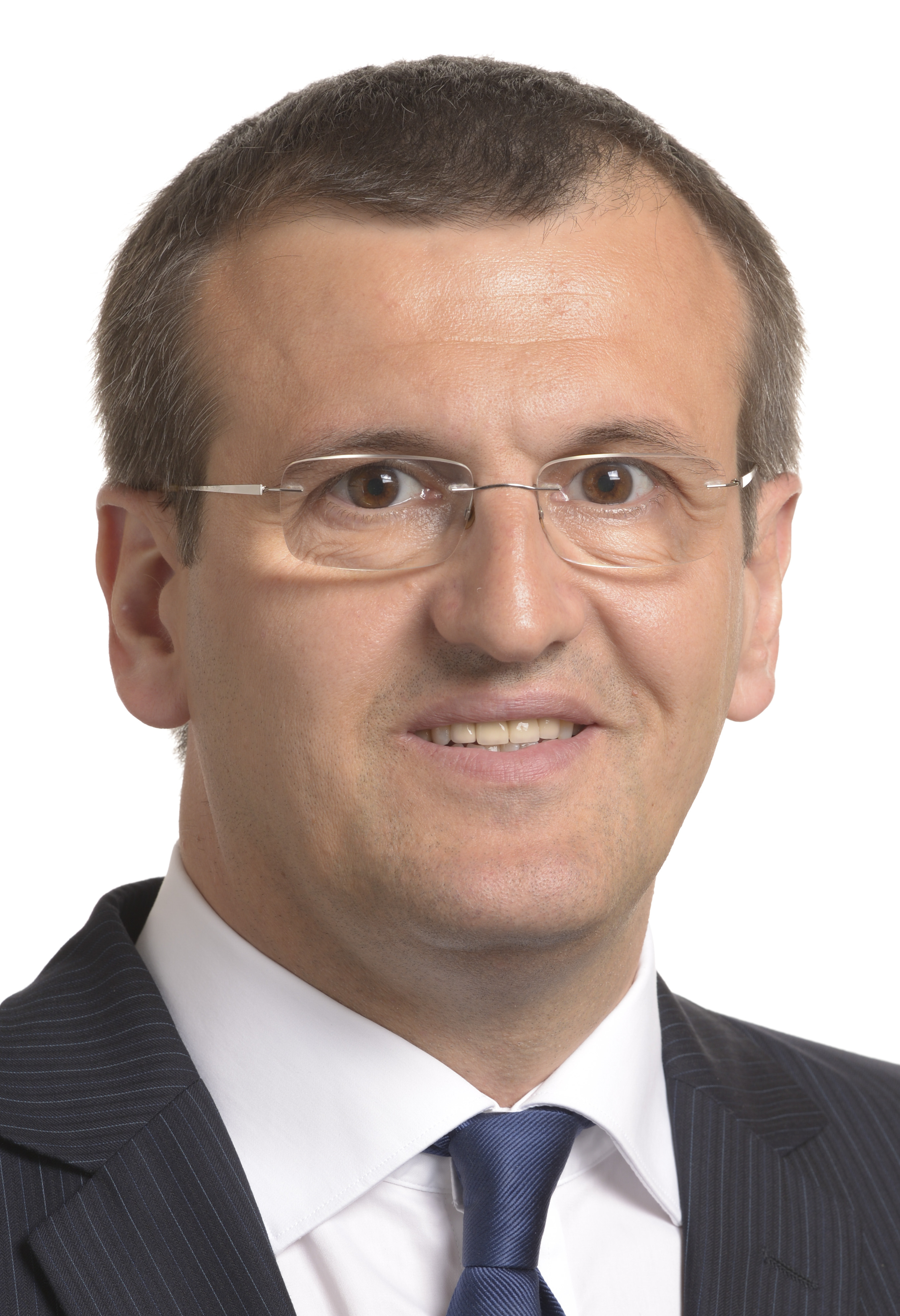

Member of the European Parliament for Romania
- In office 14 July 2009 – 1 July 2019

Personal details
- Born: 26 October 1966 (age 59) Bucharest, Romania
- Party: Romania: Democratic Liberal Party (2009–2014); People's Movement Party (2014); Independent (2014–2019); Freedom, Unity and Solidarity Party (2019–2020); EU: European People's Party
- Education: University of Bucharest; Université Paris 1 Panthéon-Sorbonne; École des hautes études en sciences sociales
- Profession: Political scientist

Cristian Dan Preda (born 26 October 1966) is a Romanian professor and politician. He is professor of political science at the University of Bucharest and was between 2009 and 2019 a Member of the European Parliament.

== Education and academic career ==
Preda was born in Bucharest, Romania. He graduated with a BA in Philosophy from the University of Bucharest in 1991, and in the same year, he obtained his MA (D.E.A.) in History of Philosophy at Paris I Panthéon-Sorbonne University, with a notation "very good". He continued his graduate studies with master's, doctoral and postdoctoral studies funded by the French Government, Erasmus Programme, Agence Universitaire de la Francophonie and New Europe College. In 1998, he obtained a Ph.D. in Political Science from the EHESS, Paris, with "summa cum laude, with the felicitations of the jury in unanimity".

Since 1992, he has taught at the Faculty of Political Science of the University of Bucharest. He is a tenured full professor and Dean of the Faculty. Since 2005, he has also been a doctoral supervisor in Political Science.

== Public and political career ==
Between March 1999 and December 2000, Cristian Preda was the presidential adviser for domestic policies of the Romanian President Emil Constantinescu.

In October 2001, Preda became a project manager of the branches of the Central and Eastern Europe Office of the Francophony University Agency (Agence universitaire pour la Francophonie). From 2002, he was a member of the regional commission of experts for this organisation.

On 21 September 2005, he was assigned junior minister for Francophonie in the Romanian Foreign Ministry and personal representative of the Romanian President Traian Băsescu. In this capacity, he took an important part in the preparation of the Francophonie Summit in Bucharest, in September 2006. On 15 March 2007 Preda became presidential adviser for education and research and continued to be the personal representative for Francophonie for President Traian Băsescu.

At the beginning of 2009, Cristian Preda decided to become a member of the Romanian Liberal Democratic Party. He was nominated in the 4th position on the list of the Liberal Democratic Party for the European Parliament elections on 7 June 2009. He was elected for a 5-year mandate and became a member of the Foreign Affairs Committee of the European Parliament. In June 2012, he became a prime vice president of the Liberal Democratic Party.

In 2014, Preda joined the People's Movement Party founded by Traian Băsescu and was re-elected to the European Parliament. He is the spokesman of the European People's Party Group on foreign affairs and First Vice-Chair of the Subcommittee on Human Rights.

== Publishing ==
Cristian Preda is the author of several volumes on:

(a) The evolution of the Romanian political thought:

- Modernitatea politică și românismul, Nemira, 1998
- Occidentul nostru, Nemira, 1999
- Staulul și sirena. Dilemele unui marxist român, Nemira, 2002
- Contribuții la istoria intelectuală a politicii românești, Meridiane, 2003

(b) The history of liberalism:

- Le libéralisme du désespoir. Tradition libérale et critique du totalitarisme dans les années 1938–1960, University of Bucharest, 2000
- Liberalismul, Nemira, 2000, IInd Ed. Humanitas, 2003
- Mic dicționar de gândire politică liberală, Humanitas, 2004

(c) Electoral systems in Romanian political history:

- România postcomunistă și România interbelică, Meridiane, 2002
- Partide şi alegeri în România postcomunistă, Nemira, 2005
- Regimul, partidele și sistemul politic din România (with Sorina Soare, Nemira, 2008)

Preda authored or coauthored over 60 scientific studies and articles in collective volumes and Romanian and foreign political science journals. He was also a regular contributor to Revista 22, Dilema veche, and Observator cultural magazines.

In parallel, he has worked as a translator for Humanitas, Babel, Anastasia, Meridiane, and Nemira publishing houses. He is the coordinator of political science collections: Societatea politică (at Ed. Nemira, 1998–2002), Polis (at Ed. Humanitas, 2003–2004) and Biblioteca de politică (at Ed. Nemira, din 2004). He was a writer at Sfera Politicii (1992–1996) and Polis (1995–1997).

Preda is an editor of Romanian political science journal Studia Politica.

== Prizes and distinctions ==
- The Nemira Prize for debut 1997
- (Romania) Commander of the National Order of Faithful Service (December, 2002)
- Knight of the Order of the Star of Romania (2009)
- (Belgium) Officer of the Belgian Order of Leopold (July, 2008)
- Grand Officer of the Order of the Crown of Belgium (2009)
- (France) Knight of the French Légion d'honneur Order (January 2009)

== Associations ==
- Member of the Social Science Centre at the University of Bucharest (1993–1994)
- Member of the Romanian Political Science Association (as of 1995)
- Member of the Group for Social Dialogue (as of 1995)
- Member of the Political Science Institute of the University of Bucharest (as of 1995)
