= ARACIS =

Since 2005, the Romanian National Council of Academic Evaluation and Accreditation of Higher Education Institutions has been replaced by ARACIS, the Romanian Agency for Quality Assurance in Higher Education, through Government Emergency Ordinance no. 75/2005 Regarding Quality Assurance in Education, which became the Law nr. 87/2006 when adopted by Parliament (with some changes).

ARACIS is a full member of ENQA and it is registered with EQAR.
