= Stanga =

Stanga may refer to:

- Luca Stanga, Italian footballer
- Stånga, locality in Swedwen
- Štanga (disambiguation)
- Stângă, Romanian surname
- Stîngă, Romanian surname, a spelling variant of Stângă
- Stanga (song) a song by early 1970s group Little Sister
