= Sebastian Burduja =

Romanian politician (born 1985)

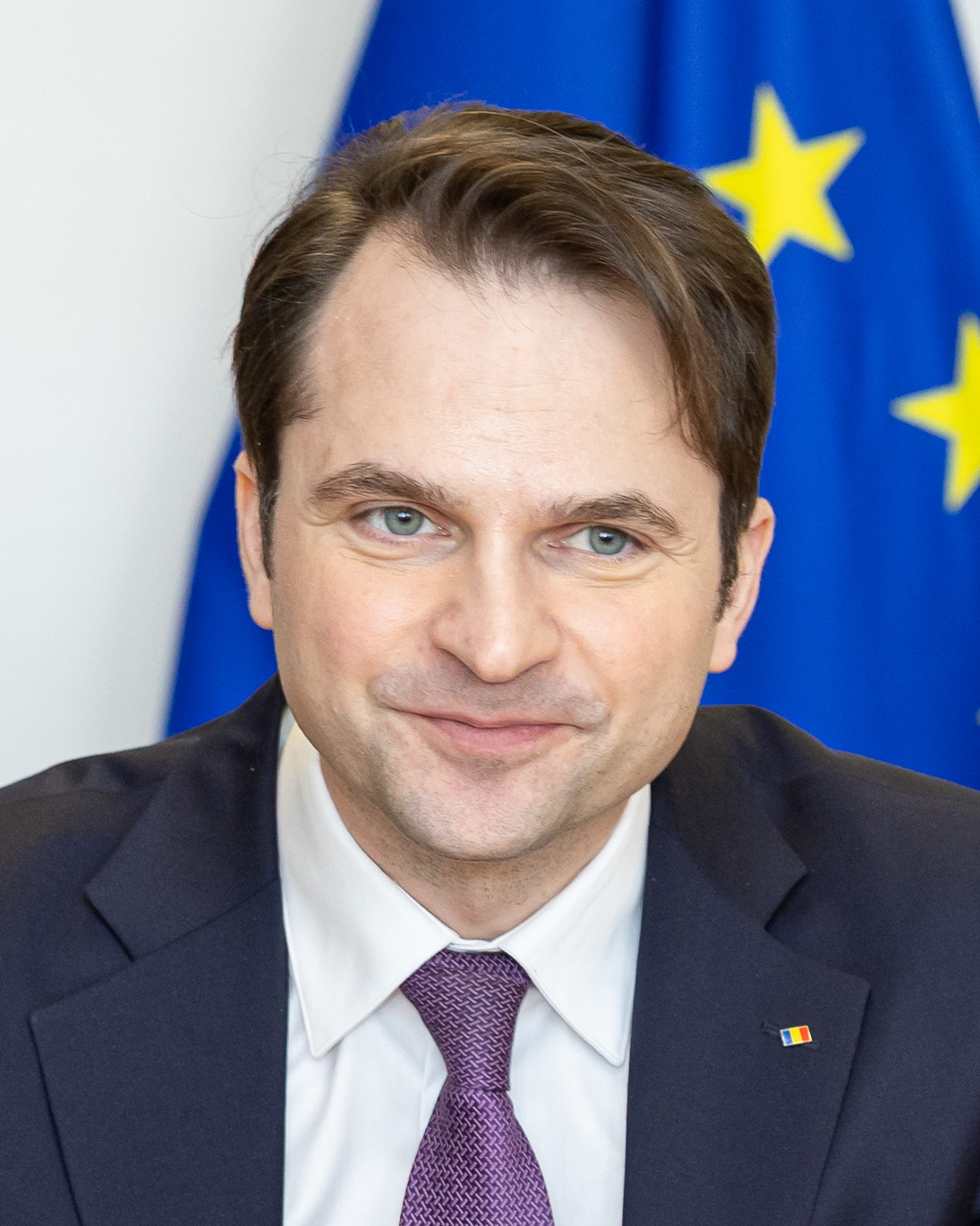
- Sebastian Burduja

Minister of Energy
- In office June 5, 2023 – June 23, 2025
- Preceded by: Virgil Popescu
- Succeeded by: Bogdan Ivan

Minister of Research, Innovation and Digitalization
- In office May 3, 2022 – June 5, 2023
- Preceded by: Marcel Boloș

Member of the Chamber of Deputies from Bucharest
- Incumbent
- Assumed office December 21, 2020

Personal details
- Born: Sebastian Ioan Burduja; June 18, 1985 (age 41) Bucharest, Romania
- Citizenship: Romania
- Party: National Liberal Party (PNL)
- Children: 4
- Education: Stanford University (BA); Harvard University (MBA, MPP); Bucharest Academy of Economic Studies (PhD)
- Profession: Economist
- Nickname(s): Tianu, SB7

Sebastian Ioan Burduja (Romanian pronunciation: [seˈbastjan burˈduʒa]; born June 18, 1985) is a Romanian economist, politician, and author, who served as Minister of Energy from June 2023 to June 2025. He previously held the position of Minister of Research, Innovation, and Digitalization from May 2022 to June 2023.

He is the President of the National Liberal Party in Bucharest since December 2024. He represents Bucharest as a member of the Parliament of Romania since December 2020, having won reelection in December 2024. In August 2025, he was appointed honorary advisor to Prime Minister Ilie Bolojan.

Before entering national politics, Burduja founded and led a new party called the Youth Civic Action Platform (PACT) and served as its president until August 2019, when PACT merged with the National Liberal Party, and Burduja became PNL's Vicepresident. Burduja founded in 2009 the League of Romanian Students Abroad (LSRS), the largest diaspora network for Romanian students and young professionals, and in 2012 the CAESAR Foundation think tank (Center for Access to the Expertise of Romanian Students and Graduates).

== Early life and education ==
Burduja was born in Bucharest, Romania. He is a graduate and valedictorian of School No. 11 Ion Heliade Rădulescu. He also graduated from the Mihai Viteazul National College in Bucharest.

In 2004, he was admitted for his undergraduate studies at Stanford University, graduating in 2008 with honors and distinction, in the top 2% of his class (Phi Beta Kappa, junior induction), with a major in Political science and minors in Economics and Sociology. At Stanford, he worked directly with Professor Larry Diamond, and contributed to his book, The Spirit of Democracy.

He was admitted directly as an undergraduate into the joint three-year MPP-MBA program at the Harvard Kennedy School and the Harvard Business School. At Harvard University, he was the recipient of the David Rubenstein Fellowship, which recognized students for their extraordinary leadership potential. He graduated from the Harvard Business School with distinction, a recognition of his remarkable academic achievements. At the Harvard Kennedy School, he worked as a teaching assistant with Professor David Gergen.

In 2016, he became a doctoral fellow at the Academy of Economic Studies and, in 2019, he was awarded the PhD in Economics and International Affairs Summa Cum Laude, with a thesis on combating business-to-business corruption. Since October 2025, he is a visiting professor at the School of Management of the National University of Political Studies and Public Administration (SNSPA).

== Career ==
Burduja served as Minister of Energy (June 2023–June 2025) and Minister of Research, Innovation, and Digitalization (May 2022-June 2023) in the Government of Romania. Between 2019–2020, he also served as Deputy Minister of Finance.

Sebastian Burduja concluded his term as Minister of Energy in June 2025, but he remains an influential voice in regional energy policy and frequently makes domestic and European headlines. After his ministerial tenure, he was appointed honorary advisor to Prime Minister Ilie Bolojan. Burduja frequently defends Romania's energy transition progress in the media. He pushed back against public criticism regarding grid capacity, highlighting that Romanian battery storage systems contributed roughly 650–700 MW to the national power network during peak evening demand hours—matching the output of a reactor at the Cernavodă Nuclear Power Plant.

In December 2020, he was elected to the Romanian Parliament for the first time, as a representative for the capital city of Bucharest. In December 2024, he won reelection in the Parliament, as the head of the National Liberal Party's list of candidates for Bucharest.

He has served as President of the National Liberal Party (PNL) in Bucharest since December 2023. In May 2024, with only six weeks before the date of the local elections, he was nominated by PNL to run for General Mayor of Bucharest. He got over 57,000 votes, ranking 4th in a competition won decisively by Nicușor Dan, who was later elected President of Romania.

In 2019, he was elected as President of the PNL Sector 1 of Bucharest, serving in that role for over four years. That same year, as a result of his civic and political activity, Burduja was selected by the German Friedrich Naumann Foundation as "one of the six freedom fighters in Eastern Europe," within the Think Freedom project, and his life story was featured in a short documentary.

On the occasion of Romania's Great Union Centennial celebration, he inaugurated in Alba Iulia the "Romania 2118" Time Capsule Monument. This is located in the Alba Carolina Citadel, on the side of the Union Bridge, near the two Cathedrals and the Union Monument. Among the authors of the messages in the time capsule are many famous Romanians: Alexandru Tomescu, Cristian Pârvulescu, Nicu Alifantis, Nicu Covaci, Mihai Covaliu, Marcel Iureș, Lazăr Comănescu, Laura Badea, Ivan Patzaichin, Ion Caramitru, Ioan-Aurel Pop, Eugen Doga, Felicia Filip, Elisabeta Lipă, etc.

In April 2016, he was elected president of the Youth Civic Action Platform (PACT), a new political movement he founded in January 2016. Supported by PACT, he ran as an independent for Parliament in December 2016, in Neamț County, one of the poorest areas in the country, where he had spent his childhood years. He earned the best score out of all independent candidates for Parliament that year.

Before returning to Romania in January 2016, Burduja spent nearly 12 years in the United States. Between 2012 and 2015, he worked as a development specialist at the World Bank, in the Washington D.C. headquarters, coordinating projects for the Europe and Central Asia region, including Romania. He was the main author or co-author of 22 technical reports and of a flagship presentation on "Reshaping the Economic Geography of Romania".

Between 2011 and 2012, he was a consultant for Dalberg Global Development Advisors, a strategic advisory company that develops country strategies and high-level development projects for emerging countries, in partnership with organizations such as the G20, the World Bank, the United Nations, etc.

He did internships at the United Nations (UN) – Economic Commission for Europe, in Geneva, at the consulting firm McKinsey & Company, in Bucharest, as well as at the Ministry of Foreign Affairs – NATO Division, at National Endowment for Democracy (Washington DC) and the Freeman Spogli Institute for International Studies (Stanford CA), where he worked as an assistant to Larry Diamond. At Harvard, he worked with, among others, Steve Jarding and David Gergen.

== Published articles and papers ==
He has published four books: "The Ten Commandments for Romania" (together with Dragoș Balta, 2025, Litera Publishing House); "The Plan for Bucharest" (2024, Litera); "The Plan for Romania" (2020, Litera); and "Between hope and disappointment. Democracy and anti-corruption in Post-Communist Romania" (2016, Editura Curtea Veche).

He is also the author of many academic articles and technical reports:

- BURDUJA, Sebastian I., Rodica Milena ZAHARIA, "Romanian Business Leaders’ Perceptions of Business-to-Business Corruption: Leading More Responsible Businesses? ”, Sustainability, Special Issue on CSR and Business Ethics for Sustainable Development, ISSN 2071-1050, 2019
- BURDUJA, Sebastian I., Rodica Milena ZAHARIA, “Corruption Perceptions on Business To Business Relations,” XVI OGÓLNOPOLSKI ZJAZD KATEDR EKONOMII, Międzynarodowa Konferencja, Ekonomiczne wyzwania XXI wieku, Polska – Unia Europejska – Świat,
- BURDUJA, Sebastian I. “State Formation in Romania: A Successful Story of Nationalism and Centralization, 1848–1864,” European Journal of Interdisciplinary 8 Studies, ISSN 2067-3795, Vol. 10, Issue 2, 2018, pp. 16–24.
- BURDUJA, Sebastian I., Marius STOIAN (coord.), Transport and Infrastructure. Concepts and operational tools, Club România Publishing House, 2018, 806 pg., ISBN 978- 606-94561-3-2
- BURDUJA, Sebastian I., Marcel IONESCU-HEROIU, “The energy of Romanian cities: challenges and stage opportunities”, in Marius Stoian, Clara Volintiru (ed.), Energy. Concepts and operational tools, Club România Publishing House, 2018, pp. 115–119, ISBN 978-606-94561-0-1
- BURDUJA, Sebastian I. “Romania’s Regional Development at the Crossroads: Where to?” Management Strategies, ISSN 2392-8123, 2017, Year X, no. III (37) / 2017, pp. 188–195
- IONESCU-HEROIU, Marcel, Sebastian Ioan BURDUJA, Florentina Ana Burlacu, “Improved Prioritization Criteria for Road Infrastructure Projects,” Romanian Journal of Transport Infrastructure, ISSN 2286-2218, 2017, Vol. 5, Issue 2, pp. 10–27
- Sebastian I. BURDUJA, “Deconstructing Moral Leadership: Lessons from Endurance in Antarctica,” 5th International Academic Conference on Strategic, Shift! Major Challenges of Today's Economy, Bucharest, Sep. 28–30, 2017, ISBN 978-606-749-269- 9, 159–171, ISI proceedings
- BURDUJA, Sebastian I. “Reach Higher In Higher Education: What Can Romania Learn from the US Example?”, Research & Education – Romanian Research and Education Models, ISSN 2559-2033, 2017, vol.1, no. 1, pp. 2–10
- BURDUJA, Sebastian I., “Ethics in Business-to-Business Relations: a Literature Review,” 2nd International e-conference – Enterprises in the Global Economy 2017, Ovidius University Constanta, Fac Econ Sci; Bucharest Univ Econ Studies, Szczecin Univ Romanian Amer Univ, Cape Peninsula Univ, June 21, 2017, 21–27, ISBN 978-88- 95922-97-3, ISI proceedings
- BURDUJA, Sebastian I., “Cities for people: the keystone of Romania's development”, in Vasile Iuga, Mihaela Nicola, Răsvan Radu (eds.), Transatlantic Romania, Bucharest, 2016
- BURDUJA, Sebastian I., “The strategic triangle of the Romanian public administration”, RO3D – Romania: Democracy, Development, Dignity, Grafoart, Bucharest, 2015
- BURDUJA, Sebastian I., Marcel IONESCU-HEROIU, Marius CRISTEA and others, Harmonization of Selection Criteria for Enhanced Coordination and Prioritization of EU and State-Funded Projects, World Bank, 2015
- CZAPSKI, Radoslaw et al., Evaluation of the Portfolio of Regional Development Projects, World Bank, 2015
- ONESCU-HEROIU, Marcel, Sebastian BURDUJA, Marius CRISTEA and others, Investment Guide for Local Projects: Communal Roads and Social Infrastructure, World Bank, 2015
- IONESCU-HEROIU, Marcel, Sebastian BURDUJA, Marius CRISTEA and others, Investment 9 Guide for Local Projects: Water and Wastewater Projects, World Bank, 2015
- IONESCU-HEROIU, Marcel, Sebastian BURDUJA, Marius CRISTEA and others, Investment Guide for County Roads, World Bank, 2015
- BURDUJA, Sebastian I., Marcel IONESCU-HEROIU, Manuela MOT and others, Coordination of Strategies and Programs for EU and State-Funded Investments in Romania’s Infrastructure, World Bank, 2015
- CZAPSKI, Radoslaw et al., Efficient and Innovative Designs and Technologies for Public Infrastructure Investments in Romania, World Bank, 2015
- BURDUJA, Sebastian I., “Beyond (dis) illusions: Opportunities in the fight against corruption through the private sector in Romania”, in Dan Dungaciu, Vasile Iuga, Marius Stoian (eds.), 7 Fundamental Themes for Romania, Rao Publishing House, Bucharest, 2014
- MARTEAU, Jean-Francois, Marcel IONESCU-HEROIU, Sebastian BURDUJA and others, Improved Prioritization Criteria for PNDL Projects, World Bank, 2014
- BURDUJA, Sebastian I., Marcel IONESCU-HEROIU and others, Identification of Project Selection Models for the Regional Operational Program 2014–2020, World Bank, 2014
- BOSE, Ranjan and others, Improving Energy Efficiency – Reports on Ploiești, Craiova, Iași, Timișoara, Cluj-Napoca, Brașov, and Constanța, World Bank, 2013
- BURDUJA, Sebastian I., Marcel IONESCU-HEROIU, Florian GAMAN and others, Romania’s Regional Operational Program 2.0: Managing Authority and Intermediate Bodies Collaboration and Communication, World Bank, 2013

== Professional affiliations ==
He is the Honorary President and cofounder of the League of Romanian Students Abroad (LSRS) and a founding member of the CAESAR Foundation (Center for Access to the Expertise of Romanian Students and Graduates). He was selected by Forbes magazine in the first "30 under 30" cohort in Romania. In 2017, he was selected by the JCI organization among 10 outstanding young people in Romania. In 2018, he was selected as a Millennium Fellow by the Atlantic Council. In 2019, he was selected by the German Marshall Fund as a Marshall Memorial Fellow. In 2025, he was awarded the Emerging Global Leader Award by the Harvard Kennedy School of Government.
