= Ionuț Moșteanu (politician) =

Romanian politician (born 1973)

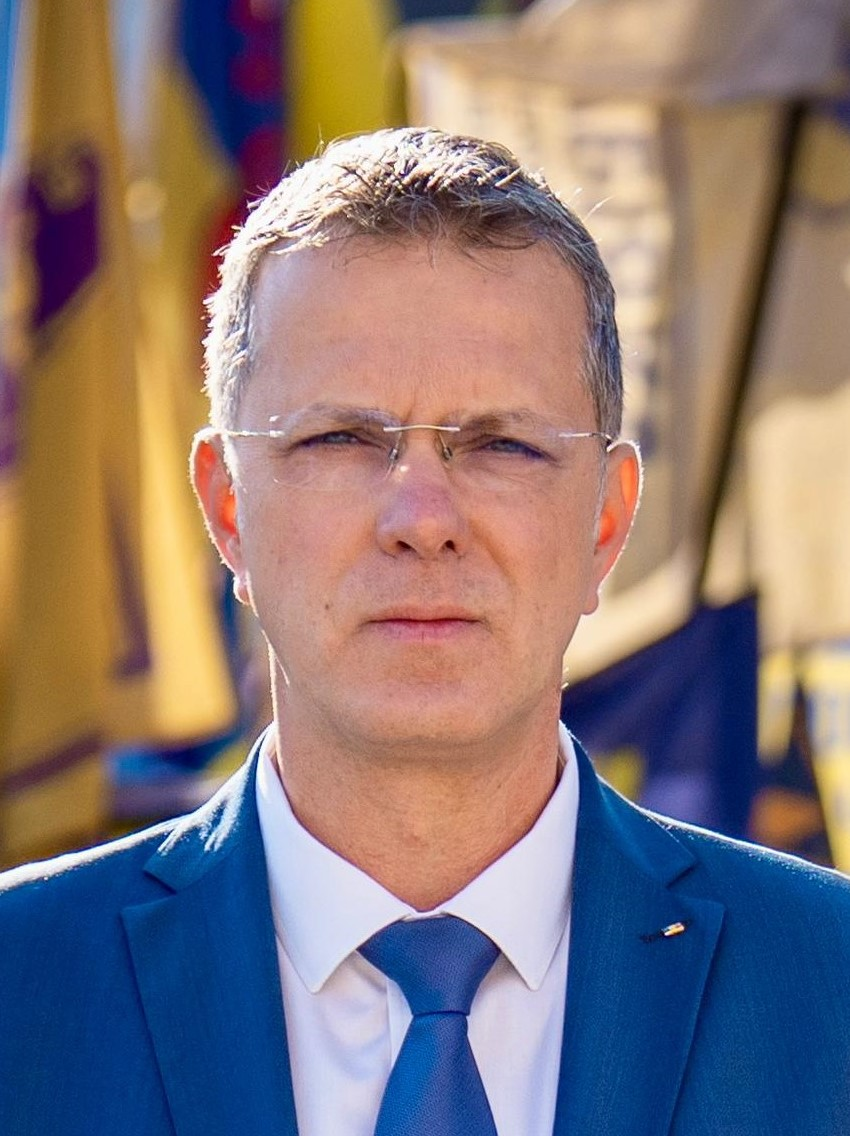
- Moșteanu in 2025

Deputy Prime Minister of Romania
- In office 23 June 2025 – 28 November 2025
- Prime Minister: Ilie Bolojan
- Succeeded by: Radu-Dinel Miruță

Minister of National Defence
- In office 23 June 2025 – 28 November 2025
- Prime Minister: Ilie Bolojan
- Preceded by: Angel Tîlvăr
- Succeeded by: Radu-Dinel Miruță (acting)

Member of the Chamber of Deputies
- Incumbent
- Assumed office 20 December 2016
- Constituency: Argeș

Personal details
- Born: 23 December 1973 (age 52) Ștefănești, Argeș County, Socialist Republic of Romania
- Party: Save Romania Union
- Education: Bioterra University
- Alma mater: Politehnica University of Bucharest

Liviu-Ionuț Moșteanu (born 23 December 1973) is a Romanian politician who served as the minister of national defence in the Bolojan cabinet between June and November 2025. He is a member of the Chamber of Deputies since 2016.

== Electoral history ==
=== Mayor of Pitești ===
Election	Affiliation	Main round		
Election	Affiliation	Votes	Percentage	Position
2020	2020 USR-PLUS Alliance	11.155	23.31%	3rd
2024	Save Romania Union	9.957	18.32%	3rd
