= Law of Romania =

The law of Romania is civil law. The Romanian judicial system experienced a major overhaul in the early 2010s, with the introduction of four new codes: the Civil Code (2011), the Civil Procedure Code (2013) and the Penal and Penal Procedure Codes (2014).

== Constitution ==
The basic law of Romania is the Constitution, which was adopted in December 1991 and revised in October 2003.

== Legislation ==
Legislation includes laws and decrees.

=== Laws ===
- Law No 28 of 28 December 1967
- Law No 71 of 29 December 1969
- Law No 22 of 28 November 1981
- Law No 3 of 12 November 1982

== Courts and judiciary ==
There is a Constitutional Court of Romania and a High Court of Cassation and Justice.

== Legal practitioners ==
There is a National Union of Bar Associations of Romania (Romanian: Uniunea Națională a Barourilor din România – UNBR) and a Bar Council. There was a Lawyers Union. In late-2019, new regulation was passed, obligating defence attorneys to report clients' cash transactions. Lawyer Silvia Uscov initiated a petition against the law, receiving 1,500 signatures from lawyers.

== Criminal law ==
Criminal law in Romania is centered on the Penal Code of Romania, which came into force on 1 February 2014.

== Private law ==
The current Civil Code of Romania came into force on 1 October 2011, replacing the old Civil Code of 1864, the Commercial Code of 1887 and the Family Code of 1953. The previous civil code came into force on 1 December 1865, and was amended numerous times over the years. It was re-published, in its amended form, in 1993 under the title Codul Civil.

For civil procedure, see the Civil procedure code of Romania.

== See also ==
- Law enforcement in Romania
