= Monica Macovei =

Romanian politician

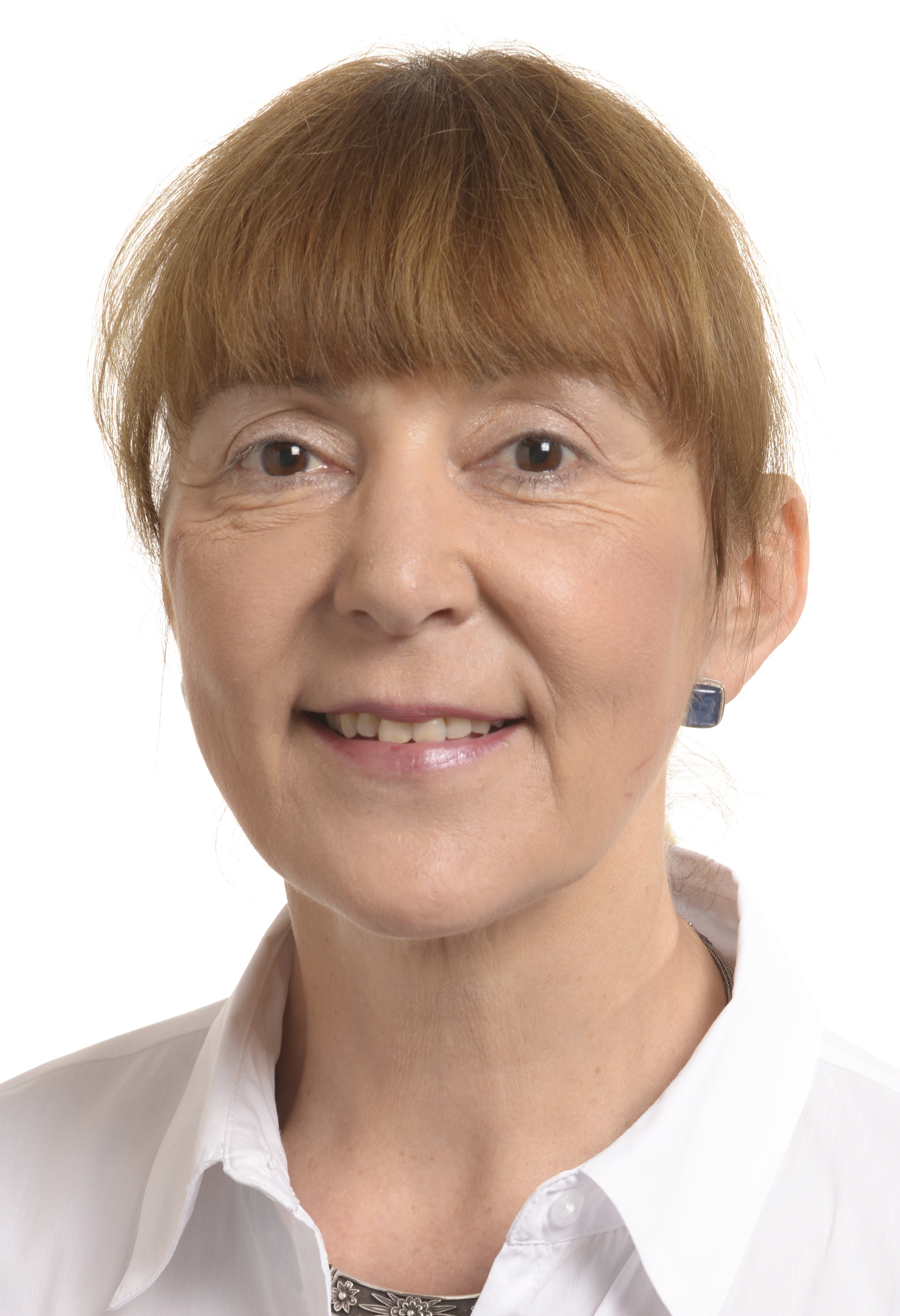

Minister of Justice
- In office 29 December 2004 – 5 April 2007
- Prime Minister: Călin Popescu-Tăriceanu
- Preceded by: Cristian Diaconescu
- Succeeded by: Tudor Chiuariu

Personal details
- Born: 4 February 1959 (age 67) Bucharest, Romania
- Party: The Right Alternative (2015-2018); Democratic Liberal Party (2009-2014); Romanian Communist Party (before 1989)
- Other political affiliations: European People's Party (2009-2014); European Conservatives and Reformists Party (2015-2019)
- Education: University of Bucharest; University of the State of New York; Central European University

Monica Luisa Macovei (Romanian pronunciation: [moˈnika luˈisa makoˈvej]; born 4 February 1959) is a Romanian politician, lawyer and former prosecutor, and former Member of the European Parliament from the European Conservatives and Reformists and formerly a member of the Romanian Democratic Liberal Party (PDL). She was the Minister of Justice of Romania in the first cabinet of Prime Minister Călin Popescu-Tăriceanu. In this position she was credited with implementing the justice reforms required for Romania to become a member state of the European Union. Macovei was also an independent candidate in Romania's 2014 presidential elections.

== Early career ==
Monica Macovei graduated in 1982 with honors from the Law Faculty of the University of Bucharest; in 1994 she received a master's of law in comparative constitutional law from the University of the State of New York/Central European University. She has served as a lecturer in law at the University of Bucharest. She has also authored a number of books and articles on legal and human rights themes.

Macovei was a prosecutor between 1983 and 1997, during the Communist and post-Communist periods. From 1997 to 2004 she was a lawyer with the Bucharest Bar.

In 1997, Macovei was an Eisenhower Exchange Fellow, an honor awarded to "men and women of outstanding achievement in mid-career, who are expected to assume positions of influence and make a difference" in their home regions, countries, or globally.

== Civic activist ==
Prior to her appointment as Justice Minister, Macovei was a civil society activist for political reform, democratization, and human rights in post-1989 Romania. She served from 2001-2004 as president of the Association for the Defence of Human Rights in Romania - The Helsinki Committee (APADOR-CH)

Macovei served as an expert/advisor to the Council of Europe, the European Roma Rights Center, the UN Development Programme, the Open Society Institute, and the International Helsinki Federation for Human Rights. She was a founding member of Transparency International-Romania. She conducted research on gender in Romanian law and on violence against women, among many other issues. As an activist, she spoke out for the need to reform Romanian justice and remove institutional protections for officials involved in corruption. She called attention to police brutality and impunity, continued political influence over the judiciary, and the lack of strong legal culture in Romania, among other issues. She represented over 20 plaintiffs before the European Court of Human Rights and trained over 1,000 law enforcement personnel on the rule of law and the European Court of Human Rights.

In 2002, along with other Romanian human rights activists, she publicly opposed the indictment of a former aide to previous President Emil Constantinescu after he accused then Prime Minister Nastase of corruption. Many Romanian news commentators agreed with her, noting what they called a serious attack on the freedom of expression. Macovei, herself, characterized the arrest as "one of the worst attempts to muzzle the press in Romania" since communism collapsed. The arrest received widespread attention in Europe as an example of alleged abuses against the press at the time.

As an activist, Macovei supported LGBT rights, an issue on which she would also focus in her political career. In 2000, she assisted Romanian gay rights groups in overturning Article 200, one of the last sodomy laws in Europe. While Minister of Justice, Macovei intervened in May 2005 to help ensure that the Romanian LGBT rights group Accept could hold the country's first pride parade, the Bucharest GayFest, after the Bucharest City Hall had denied the group a parade permit. As MEP, she joined the European Parliament Intergroup on LGBT rights. She was the only Romanian politician to support Bucharest GayFest 2011.

== Justice Minister ==
Macovei was appointed Justice Minister in December 2004, following the surprise victory of then Democratic Party (PD) leader Traian Băsescu in the second round of presidential elections against Social Democratic Party (PSD) candidate Adrian Năstase. Băsescu's victory was characterized in the media as Romania's "Orange Revolution," comparing the victory of perceived reformists in Romania to events in neighboring Ukraine during the same period. It was also a reference to the orange color used by the winning Justice and Truth Alliance, which comprised the PD and the National Liberal Party (PNL) led by Calin Popescu-Tăriceanu. Independent civil society organizations played an important role in securing the victory of the Justice and Truth Alliance, and Macovei's appointment was seen as acknowledgement of this contribution. As an activist who had spent much of her career advocating for judicial reform in Romania, she also appeared to be well-situated to implement extensive reforms as well as increased efforts against high profile corruption, both of which were requirements for EU accession. Anti-corruption was also a prominent theme in the parliamentary and presidential elections of that year.

=== Anti-Corruption Reforms ===
Shortly after her appointment, Macovei stated that "fighting corruption" would be one of the top priorities of the Ministry of Justice under her leadership.

Many of Macovei's actions as minister were aimed at eliminating vestiges of communism from the Romanian justice system. She disbanded the Justice Ministry's secret service, called the General Directorate for Protection and Anti-Corruption, which had continued operating after the fall of communism. The organization had been wiretapping judges and gathering other information, which, Macovei stated, "we do not really know ended up where or with whom." She also implemented new procedures to check the backgrounds of judges and prosecutors to determine if they had worked with the former Securitate internal intelligence service and to remove those who had collaborated. Macovei secured passage of legislation to eliminate immunities accorded to former government ministers and other government notables and to make tax evasion a criminal offense. She increased the salaries of judges and prosecutors to make them less susceptible to bribes.

Macovei was also credited with invigorating the National Anticorruption Directorate (DNA), which had been set up several years before to investigate and prosecute large scale corruption cases and those involving Members of Parliament and other high level officials. Macovei appointed a new head of the Directorate, prosecutor Dan Morar, under whose leadership the DNA issued an indictment against Chamber of Deputies president and former prime minister Adrian Năstase, the highest level official to face prosecution in a corruption case in the history of post-communist Romania. By January 2007, the DNA had indicted eight Members of Parliament, two serving government ministers, nine judges and prosecutors, and 70-80 police and customs officers.

Over the same period, Macovei often fought with the Romanian Parliament over her anti-corruption initiatives. Opposition MPs accused her of abuse of power, while Macovei stated that MPs sought to stop judicial reform and anti-corruption efforts to protect their own interests. In 2006, the Parliament initially voted against a measure by Macovei to keep the DNA operating as an independent office. Opposition MPs stated the negative vote was partially due to Macovei's failure to appear in the Parliament to defend the measure. They also questioned the DNA's independence from political influence. President Băsescu vetoed the Parliament's action, and, after international pressure and political negotiations, the Parliament ultimately voted on a revised measure to retain the DNA's authorities and independence. Independent political commentator Cristian Pârvulescu suggested the Parliament's initial negative vote was influenced by the large number of anti-corruption investigations initiated by the DNA under Macovei.

Macovei encountered similar resistance in efforts to create a new National Integrity Agency (ANI) to check the source of MPs and ministers' assets and investigate possible conflicts of interest. The draft law remained under consideration in the Parliament, where MPs reportedly altered and watered down the measures.

In October 2006, Macovei appointed 33-year-old lawyer Laura Kövesi as Prosecutor General In February 2007, the Romanian Senate Judicial Commission, however, voted to remove the authority of the Minister of Justice to nominate the Prosecutor General. The commission instead proposed assigning full authority over the nomination to the Superior Council of Magistrates (CSM). Macovei said that the Senate's measure, if approved by the full Parliament, would greatly impede the government's ability to combat corruption as the Prosecutor General is a central figure in that effort. Kövesi remained in office and went on to pursue a number of cases against Romanian political figures.

In its 2007 annual report on Romania, Reporters without Borders characterized as "encouraging" reform of the Romanian penal code initiated by Macovei that would decriminalize defamation and libel. Macovei said the proposed reformed code, which included many other changes and had been posted on the Justice Ministry's website for public debate, was necessary for modernizing Romania's legal system and to comply with EU norms. It would replace a draft penal code passed into law in 2004, but never enacted, under former Justice Minister and subsequent Conservative Party Senator Rodica Stănoiu. The Romanian Senate disagreed and, in February 2007, passed a measure to enact the so-called "Stănoiu Code" instead of Macovei's penal code. Macovei said the "Stănoiu Code," if passed by the full Parliament, would bring Romanian penal justice to a halt. Macovei was supported by the European Commission in the debate, and the Stănoiu Code was not implemented.

=== Parliamentary Motion against Macovei ===
On 13 February 2007 the Romanian Senate passed by secret ballot a simple motion calling for Macovei's resignation. The measure, titled "Lying - Macovei's Way of Justice," was the first such motion ever passed in the Romanian Parliament against an individual cabinet member. It was supported by 81 senators out of 137. The motion accused Macovei of delaying justice reform (including application of the 2004 Penal Code), intervening in the judicial process, facilitating the release of several criminals, and attacking activities of the Parliament. It also called for measures guaranteeing the independence of judges and prosecutors from political influence. The vote was tabled by the Conservative Party, with support from the other opposition parties, primarily the Social Democratic Party (PSD) and the nationalist Greater Romania Party. The number of votes against Macovei on the measure indicated that many senators from her own center-right governing bloc did not support her.

The Constitutional Court, however, ruled that the vote of no confidence did not force her to resign and she remained in office, with the public support of the Prime Minister. A number of MPs from several parties, however, continued to call on Macovei to step down regardless of the Constitutional Court's decision. Several said they based their vote on her failure to communicate with the Parliament.

European Commissioner for Justice Franco Frattini came out quickly in support of Macovei following the motion, stating publicly that he "held Macovei in high regard." Other European officials also expressed support for her. The Social Democratic Party Deputy Speaker of the German Bundestag warned that Macovei's dismissal as a result of the parliamentary motion could lead the EU to invoke the safe guard clauses the EU introduced to prevent Romania from abandoning reform efforts after it joined the EU. The European Commission (EC) however, officially took a neutral position, with the EC spokesman stating "this vote is a domestic issue for Romania and cannot be commented upon.”

In addition, there was a demonstration against the Parliament in support of Macovei by a number of civil society organizations, including Freedom House, the Romanian Academic Society and APADOR-CH, with organizers stating that MPs passed the motion against Macovei because they were worried by her push for more transparency and stricter controls on conflicts of interest. Transparency International condemned the anti-Macovei motion, stating that the text voted by the Senate was "written in a superficial manner and motivated by political reasons, ignoring the principle of independence of judiciary." Journalist Traian Ungureanu said "We do not want our country to be stolen by a few oligarchs in the Parliament."

International media described the vote of no-confidence as an attempt to derail reforms, including Macovei's efforts to create the National Integrity Agency, which would examine legislators' accounts. The Economist described the motion against Macovei as a by-product of the feud between the Prime Minister and the President. The on-line journal Southeast Europe Times noted that Macovei had several public disputes with judges on the Superior Council of Magistrates, most of whom are associated with the opposition Social Democratic Party that supported the motion.

Macovei, herself, expressed the view that the Parliament could only be seeking to get rid of her because of her efforts against corruption, including investigations by her ministry against several members of the Senate. She stated that the investigations were carried out regardless of political party affiliation.

=== International and domestic recognition ===
Macovei received much praise internationally from politicians and the media for the reforms she implemented while Justice Minister. EU Commissioner for Enlargement Olli Rehn stated that as a result of Macovei's efforts "For the first time in the history of the country, nobody is above the law."

European Commissioner for Justice Frattini said that a "big part of the success of Romania's EU accession was achieved as a result of Macovei's work."

The Economist described Macovei as:

an effective administrator who has shaken up the structure and accountability of the judiciary and the prosecutor’s office.

Macovei was nominated for the Campaigner of the Year 2006 award, as part of the European Voice Europeans of the Year Awards, for "driving through tough laws tackling corruption and reforming the judiciary, improving her country’s readiness to join the EU."

Noted Romanian academic and former Foreign Minister Andrei Pleşu (who also briefly served as an advisor to President Băsescu) described Macovei, in her fight against corruption, as:

a fragile samurai, a translucent fighter who does not win by violence and heaviness. Precision, attention to detail and tenacity are her weapons.

=== Departure from Government ===
Prime Minister Popescu-Tăriceanu dismissed Macovei on 2 April 2007, when he reshuffled his cabinet primarily to exclude the Democratic Party of President Traian Băsescu, with whom he remained engaged in a prolonged and heated public feud. Before and while she was Justice Minister, Macovei claimed to be politically independent. Nonetheless, President Băsescu's Democratic Party (PD) consistently backed her. The media reported that Popescu-Tăriceanu and his National Liberal Party (PNL) sought to expel her from the cabinet partially because she supported Băsescu and the PD in opposing Popescu-Tăriceanu's decision to postpone Romania's European Parliament elections that year due to what he characterized as ongoing domestic disputes.

International media characterized Macovei's ouster as a departure from the aggressive reform efforts Romania had enacted in the previous two years to enter the EU.

Following her departure from government, from July 2007 until April 2009, Macovei served as Anti-Corruption Advisor to the Prime Minister of Macedonia, with support from the British Foreign Office.

== Member of the European Parliament ==
In 2009, Macovei joined the Democratic Liberal Party (successor of the PD), and won an MEP seat on the party's list in that year's European Parliament Elections. She was re-elected to the European Parliament in 2014 and was part of the European People's Party group before joining the Group of European Conservatives and Reformists in October 2015.

In the Parliament, she became chair of the Delegation to the EU-Moldova Parliamentary Cooperation Committee, a member of the Committee on Budgetary Control (CONT), of the Committee on Civil Liberties, Justice and Home Affairs (LIBE) and of the Special committee on organised crime, corruption and money laundering (CRIM), and a substitute on the Committee on Foreign Affairs (AFET) and to the Delegation to the EU-Former Yugoslav Republic of Macedonia Joint Parliamentary Committee.

In May 2011 she was elected as one of the 15 vice presidents for the National Coordinating Council of the Democratic Liberal Party (PDL).

In 2011, she made 41 speeches on transparency and anti-corruption in the EU, and also condemned human rights violations and clashes all around the world (Pakistan, Tunisia, Belarus, Egypt, Thailand, Congo, Madagascar, Guantanamo). She also signed the motion for a resolution on the EU's efforts to combat corruption and co-signed around 40 other join motions in 2011.

On 26 September 2012 Macovei won the Parliament Magazine's Justice and civil liberties prize. As a member of parliament's justice and civil liberties committee she took the opportunity to expand her battle for anti-corruption, for transparency and for civil liberties at EU level. She also went beyond EU borders trying to ensure the rule of law, justice and civil liberties are respected in other countries and not some distant hope for the future. Since the beginning of 2012, Macovei made six speeches in plenary about human rights violations in countries such as Bahrain and Syria.

In an interview in June 2014, Macovei advocated stronger sanctions against Russia in response to Russian military aggression in Ukraine. She also noted the importance of NATO and EU accession to reform in central and eastern Europe, stating that the best window for enacting reform can be in the period between NATO and EU membership.

On 27 October 2015 she joined the European Conservatives and Reformists. She left the European Parliament after the elections 2019.

== Campaign for the Romanian Presidency ==
In 2014, Macovei ran as an independent candidate in Romania's presidential elections, after resigning from the PDL, which was supporting party leader and Sibiu mayor Klaus Iohannis. She ran on a platform of anti-corruption and rule-of-law, as well as on her record as Justice Minister and MEP.

In the first round of the elections in October, Macovei received 4.44% in the national vote. She received her best results in large cities: Bucharest - 12%; Cluj-Napoca - 11.87%; Timișoara – 9.23%; Constanța – 8.84%; and Iași - 10%. More than 15% of the Romanians who voted abroad voted for Macovei. Macovei stated that statistics showed that those who voted for her were mostly between 18 and 35 and with higher education. Nonetheless, her fifth place finish meant she did not go on to the second round run-off elections, in which Iohannis and Prime Minister and PSD leader Victor Ponta would compete. Macovei endorsed Iohannis, who would go on to win the elections.

At one point during the campaign, Ponta made reference to Macovei's Greek Catholic faith, to which she had converted.

On 4 November 2014, following her presidential electoral defeat, Macovei said she would seek to establish a new political party in Romania, which was later called M10.

== Controversies ==
Macovei was involved in a number of controversies in Romania while Justice Minister, sometimes indirectly. Media and groups in support of Macovei noted that domestic criticism against her by the local media and Romanian parliament increased markedly after Romania's accession to the EU when politicians no longer worried about implications in Brussels. They also said such attacks stemmed from a broader and very public conflict between Prime Minister Popescu-Tăriceanu and President Traian Băsescu, which divided the ruling coalition and contributed to the break-up of the "Justice and Truth Alliance." Macovei consistently stated that the attacks lodged against her by politicians were "proof that reform was on the right track" under her leadership.

=== Alleged abuse of power ===
Monica Macovei was on several occasions accused of abuse of power in her position as Minister of Justice. One such incident involved a comment she made on national television that reporters had no right to criticize her and her ministry and that they should pay attention to their own "problems with Romanian justice." Her comment appeared aimed at the director of the Romanian newspaper Ziua, Sorin Roşca Stănescu, who had been vocal in making allegations against Macovei and admitted having been a collaborator of the communist secret police, Securitate. Aidan White, president of the International Federation of Journalists (IFJ), criticized Macovei's assertion, saying that "Any journalist should be granted the presumption of innocence especially by the Minister of Justice."

Stănescu and his colleague Răzvan Săvăliuc also alleged that the NGOs supporting Macovei against the Romanian Parliament had done so because they received funding from the Ministry of Justice or because they supported controversial causes linked to Macovei.

In June 2005, Prime Minister Popescu-Tăriceanu sought Macovei's intervention in a corruption case against Rompetrol chairman and important PNL member, Dinu Patriciu. According to media, Popescu-Tăriceanu called Macovei to his office to meet with Patriciu, who complained about alleged procedural problems and other aspects of his case. Macovei fully acknowledged the meeting in the media, as well as her surprise that the Prime Minister had organized the meeting. There was no indication that Macovei allowed the meeting to affect Patriciu's case, which remained under investigation.

Superior Council of Magistrates (CSM) Judge Florica Bejinaru accused Macovei of "political police-style" tactics to try to obtain her resignation. Bejinaru had reportedly been found to have worked with the Securitate intelligence service during the communist period, a factor that would generally disqualify her from holding a position on the CSM. Bejinaru admitted having collaborated with the Securitate, but denied ever harming anyone. The agency charged with reviewing the Securitate archives cleared Bejinaru of collaboration.

Macovei accused Secretary General of the Government Radu Stroe on 14 March 2007 of illegally changing the text of laws between the time they are passed by the Parliament and printed in the official monitor. Stroe denied the allegation. The media separately reported on the same day that Stroe had hired a personal advisor under criminal investigation for tax evasion and links to organized crime. Stroe dismissed the advisor after the report. Popescu-Tăriceanu publicly supported Stroe against Macovei during the row.

Shortly after Macovei became Minister of Justice, some media alleged that a court case concerning the ownership of a house was resolved in an irregular fashion to the advantage of Macovei's mother. Macovei denied any involvement in the case.

=== Ordinances Allowing Monitoring in Organized Crime, Terrorism Cases ===
In late 2006, Macovei recommended and secured passage by the Cabinet of two emergency ordinances (no. 99 and 131) to allow monitoring in specific circumstances without warrant of phone calls, electronic mail, and bank accounts by the Department of Investigation of Organized Crime and Terrorism Offences (DIICOT). The two ordinances have been loosely compared to the U.S. Patriot Act in terms of the powers they give to authorities investigating certain types of crime.

Critics in the Parliament, media, and civil society called the ordinances unconstitutional, a violation of privacy, and a drift towards authoritarianism. Several opposition Senators also referenced these ordinances as a reason they passed the February 2007 motion calling for her resignation.

Macovei and General Prosecutor Kövesi defended the measures by stating that investigators would not have access to the actual content of records or conversations without warrants, but rather access to information on telephone and electronic traffic. This meant investigators could find out with whom or how an individual communicated, but not what was said. Macovei said that the Romanian government obtained the technology to conduct his type of monitoring with financial support from the U.S. PD President Emil Boc stated on the Romanian talk show Naşul that President Băsescu recommended that Macovei pass the emergency ordinances.

=== Performance as Prosecutor ===
A dossier released by the General Prosecutor's Office in 2008 accused Macovei of "repeated negligence in dealing with cases and repeated delays in resolving some cases" while she was a prosecutor until 1997. Macovei said she had never seen the file but had "nothing to hide" from her time as a prosecutor. She resigned from the position in 1997 following a conflict with then General Prosecutor Nicolae Cochinescu, who was dismissed by President Constantinescu the same year for allegedly blocking politically sensitive investigations.

Dan Voiculescu, media owner and leader of the Conservative Party (PC), presented in September 2006 what he claimed were several blank search warrants issued and signed by Monica Macovei in 1984 when she was a prosecutor. PC Deputy Secretary General and former Greater Romania Party member Codrin Stefanescu made a similar claim. Blank warrants were often used during the communist period in Romania to allow prosecutors or police to conduct searches without due process.

Macovei replied that the warrant Voiculescu showed to the press was worthless, as it was neither dated nor registered and therefore never valid. She accused Voiculescu of using Securitate-style tactics in making the accusations against her, a clear reference to Voiculescu's own past as a collaborator with the former communist secret police. Voiculescu was one of Macovei's strongest critics in the Parliament while she was Justice Minister.

== Personal life ==
Monica Macovei grew up in Bucharest, the only daughter of Vasile Gherghescu (a lawyer) and Silvia Gherghescu (a teacher). She is divorced and has one son, Radu.

In April 2006, Macovei entered her flat to smell gas fumes filling her home from a nozzle that had apparently been turned or left on. Police found no apparent explanation for the incident, although the possibility remained that it was meant to be an attack on her. The press reported that the government provided no special security for her residence.

== Electoral history ==
=== Presidential elections ===
| Election | Affiliation | First round | | | Second round | | |
| Election | Affiliation | Votes | Percentage | Position | Votes | Percentage | Position |
|---|---|---|---|---|---|---|---|
| 2014 | Independent | 421,648 | 4.44% | 5th | | | |
