= Bogdan Ivan =

Romanian politician (born 1991)

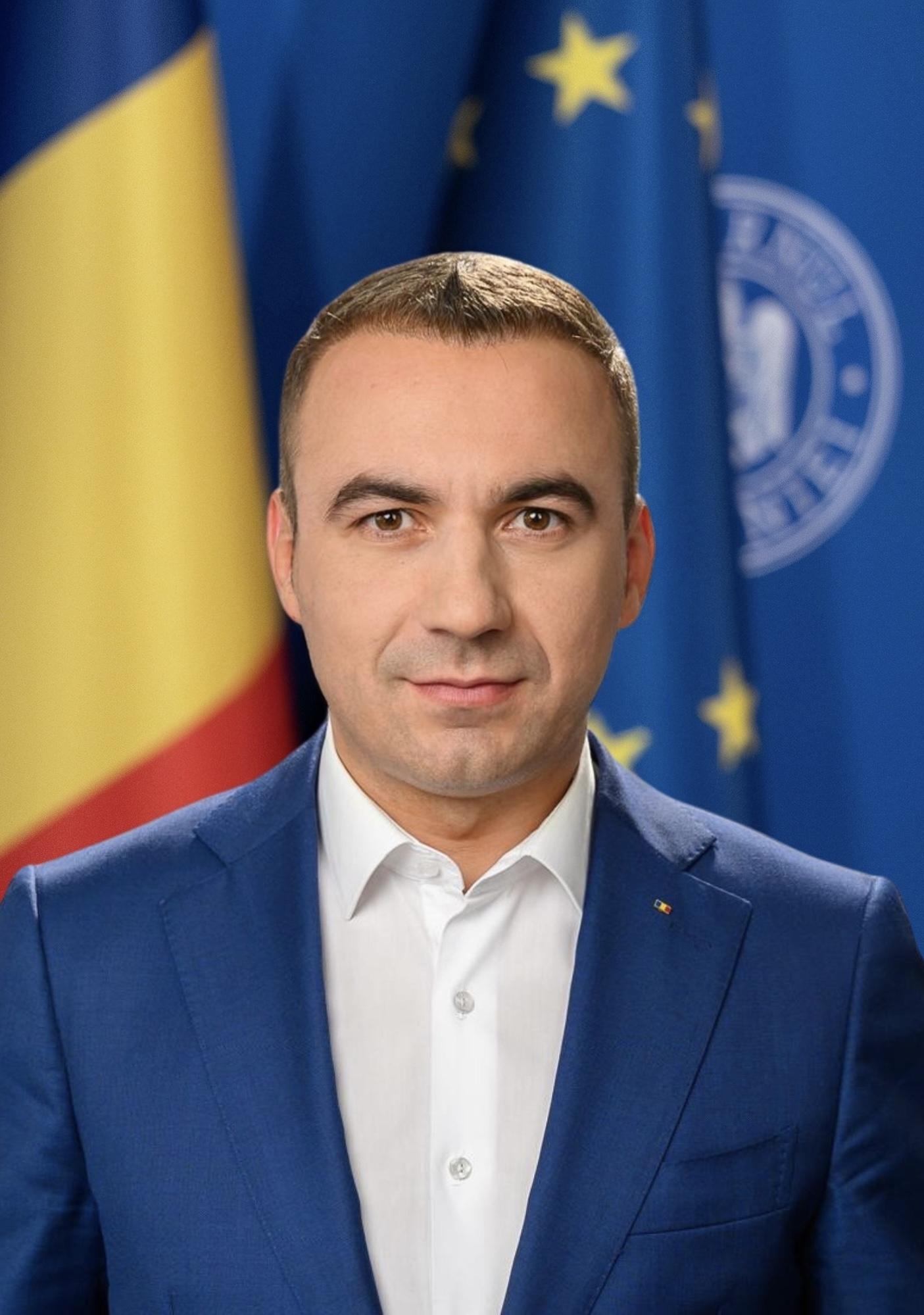
- Official portrait, 2025

Minister of Energy
- In office 23 June 2025 – 25 April 2026
- Prime Minister: Ilie Bolojan
- Preceded by: Sebastian Burduja
- Succeeded by: Ilie Bolojan (acting)

Minister of Economy, Digitalization, Entrepreneurship and Tourism
- In office 23 December 2024 – 23 June 2025
- Prime Minister: Marcel Ciolacu; Cătălin Predoiu (acting)
- Preceded by: Ștefan-Radu Oprea
- Succeeded by: Radu Miruță

Minister of Research, Innovation and Digitalization
- In office 15 June 2023 – 23 December 2024
- Prime Minister: Marcel Ciolacu
- Preceded by: Sebastian Burduja

Member of the Chamber of Deputies
- Incumbent
- Assumed office 21 December 2020
- Constituency: Bistrița-Năsăud

Personal details
- Born: 24 March 1991 (age 35)
- Party: Social Democratic
- Spouse: Oana Măriuța
- Children: 1
- Education: Babeș-Bolyai University

Bogdan-Gruia Ivan (Note: Romanian pronunciation: [boɡˈdan ˈɡruja iˈvan]) (born 24 March 1991) is a Romanian politician of the Social Democratic Party. He served as Minister of Research, Innovation and Digitalization from 15 June 2023 until 23 December 2024, when he was appointed Minister of Economy, Digitalization, Entrepreneurship and Tourism. He was elected member of the Chamber of Deputies in the 2020 parliamentary election, and previously worked as advisor to the president of the Bistrița-Năsăud County Council from 2012 to 2020.
