= Radu Miruță =

Romanian politician

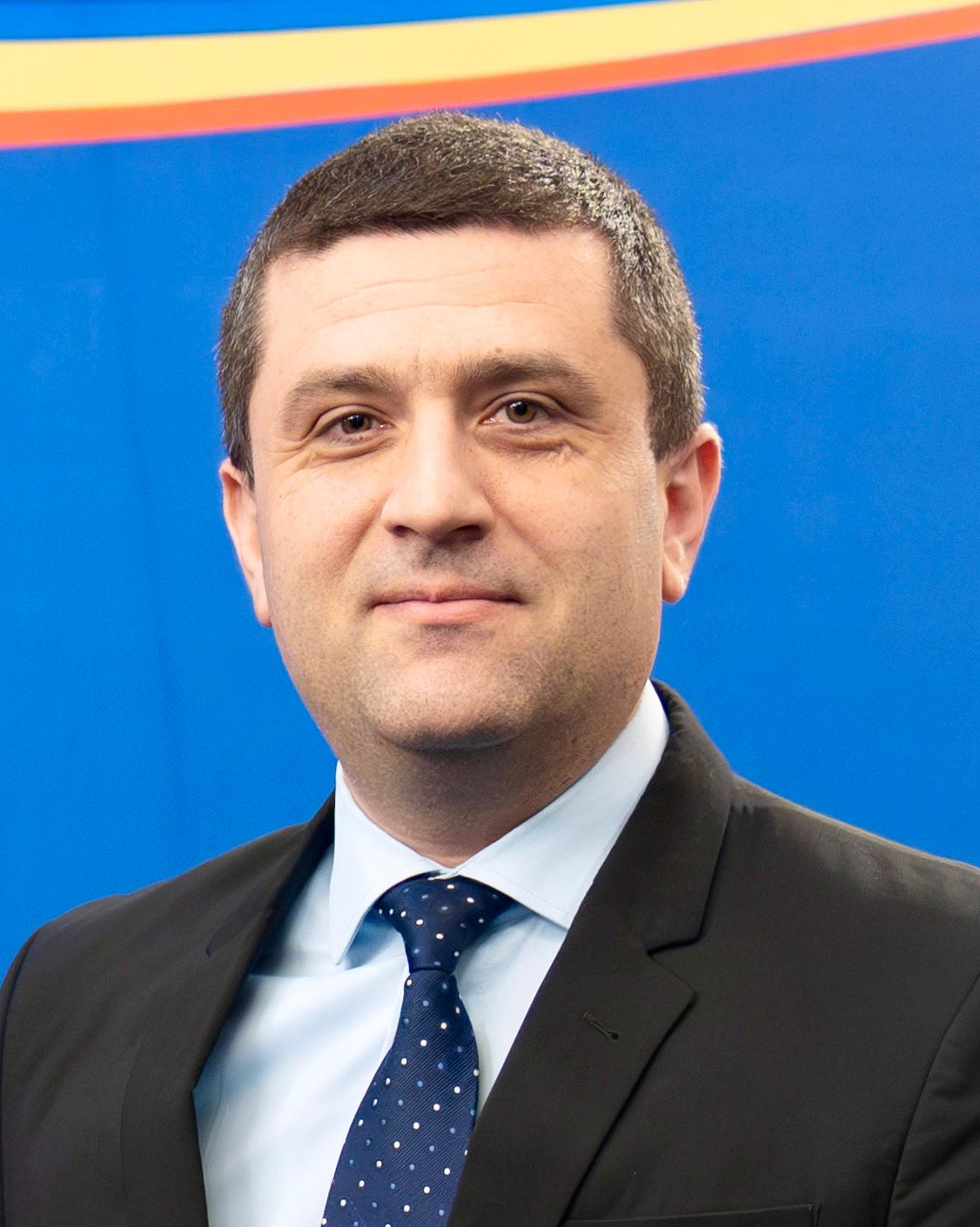
- Miruță in 2026

Minister of Economy, Digitalisation, Entrepreneurship, and Tourism
- In office 23 June 2025 – 23 December 2025
- Prime Minister: Ilie Bolojan
- Preceded by: Bogdan Ivan
- Succeeded by: Irineu Darău

Member of the Chamber of Deputies
- Incumbent
- Assumed office 21 December 2020
- Constituency: Gorj

Minister of National Defence
- In office 28 November 2025 – 20 October 2026
- Prime Minister: Ilie Bolojan
- Preceded by: Ionuț Moșteanu
- Succeeded by: Ștefan-Radu Oprea

Personal details
- Born: 8 April 1985 (age 41) Tismana, Gorj County, Romania
- Party: Save Romania Union
- Education: Politehnica University of Bucharest
- Occupation: Politician, engineer

Radu Dinel Miruță (Note: Romanian pronunciation: [ˈradu diˈnel miˈrut͡sə]) (born 8 April 1985) is a Romanian politician and engineer, who served as Minister of National Defence in the previous government of Romania from 28 November 2025 to 20 October 2026, first serving as interim Minister of National Defence between 28 November and 23 December 2025. Previously, he served as Minister of Economy, Digitalisation, Entrepreneurship and Tourism between 23 June and 23 December 2025.

== Biography ==
He graduated from the Faculty of Electronics, Telecommunications and Information Technology of the Politehnica University of Bucharest, specializing in telecommunication technology.

He worked as a software and telecommunications engineer for a wide array of companies such as Cosmote, Ericsson and as an advanced services consultant for Cisco. In 2013 he obtained his Ph.D. in telecommunications; his thesis is used as a basis in the telecommunications industry of France.

From December 2020, he represents Gorj County in the Chamber of Deputies, as a member of the Save Romania Union party.

After the resignation of Prime Minister Marcel Ciolacu in May 2025, Radu Miruță was chosen as Minister of Economy, Digitalisation, Entrepreneurship and Tourism under new prime minister Ilie Bolojan, on 23 June 2025.

After Ionuț Moșteanu resigned from office in November 2025, Radu Miruță was named interim Minister of Defence on 28 November. On 23 December, he was official named minister with Irineu Darău being chosen as the new Minister of Economy, Digitalisation, Entrepreneurship and Tourism.
