= DGIA =

DGIA is an Initialism which can stand for:

- Direcţia Generală de Informaţii a Apărării (General Directorate for Defense Intelligence) is Romania's military intelligence agency, subordinated to the Ministry of National Defense.
- Stiftung Deutsche Geisteswissenschaftliche Institute im Ausland (Foundation German Institutes of Humanities Abroad) maintains autonomous research institutes dedicated to the promotion of humanities research in host countries, and connections with researchers in the Federal Republic of Germany.
