= Penal Procedure Code of Romania =

The Penal Procedure Code of Romania (Romanian: Codul de procedură penală al României) is the basic document governing criminal procedure in Romania. The current code came into force on 1 February 2014, alongside a new Penal Code.

The Code has some processes that are commonly used in many countries. A criminal complaint is considered evidence. The defendant may rebut the Complaint in writing. Medical records and forensics are available as evidence. Scientific evidence is allowed.

== See also ==
- Law of Romania
- Penal Code of Romania
