= Ștefan-Radu Oprea =

Romanian politician (born 1970)

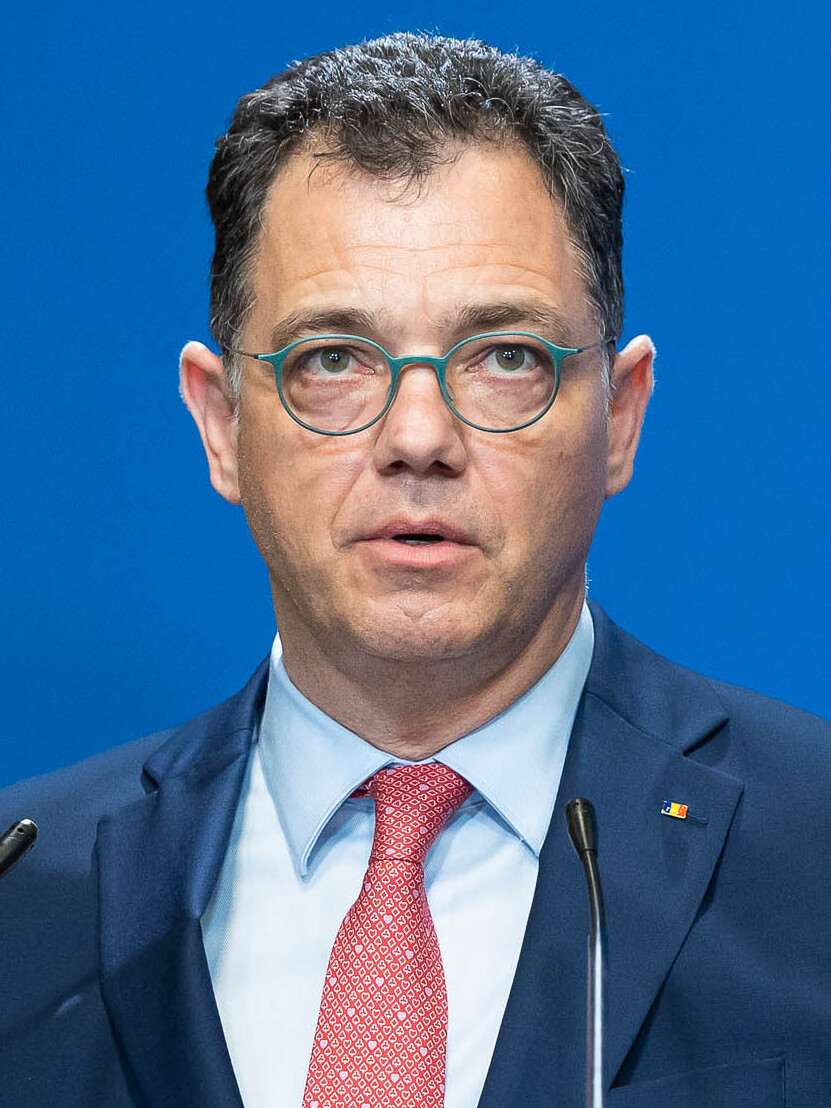
- Oprea in 2023

Minister of National Defence
- Incumbent
- Assumed office 20 October 2026
- Prime Minister: Luca Niculescu
- Preceded by: Radu Miruță

Minister of Economy, Entrepreneurship and Tourism
- In office 15 June 2023 – 23 December 2024
- Prime Minister: Marcel Ciolacu
- Preceded by: Office established (Note: Florin Spătaru (as minister of economy) Constantin-Daniel Cadariu (as minister of entrepreneurship and tourism))
- Succeeded by: Bogdan Ivan

Minister for Businesses, Trade and Entrepreneurship
- In office 29 January 2018 – 4 November 2019
- Prime Minister: Viorica Dăncilă
- Preceded by: Ilan Laufer
- Succeeded by: Office abolished (Note: Virgil-Daniel Popescu (as minister for Economy, energy and the business Environment))

Member of the Senate
- Incumbent
- Assumed office 19 December 2012
- Constituency: Prahova

Personal details
- Born: 14 June 1970 (age 56)
- Party: Social Democratic Party

Ștefan-Radu Oprea (Note: Romanian pronunciation: [ʃteˈfan ˈradu ˈopre̯a]) (born 14 June 1970) is a Romanian politician of the Social Democratic Party. Since 2026, he has been serving as Minister of National Defence. Previously, from 2023 to 2026, he served as Minister of Economy, Entrepreneurship and Tourism.

He has been a member of the Senate since 2012, and served as minister for businesses, trade and entrepreneurship from 2018 to 2019.
