= Romanian judicial reform =

Recent decades have seen a surge in the birth of "supraterritorial institutions and associations", that have been gathered by their enactment of common law and practices. European Union's regional expansion into Southeastern Europe to include Romania is one such example. The community of European states has enacted treaties that have allowed them to unite politically and economically.

Since the onset of the Treaty of Accession 2005 between Romania and the EU, judicial reform has been one of the major efforts undertaken by the Romanian government. Whereas the EU has a standardized set of institutional policies, Romania has yet to implement all of the necessary political reforms which will aid the process of judicial cooperation between Romania and EU member states, and also help Romania combat widespread corruption.

The judicial institutions and policies of EU member states are consolidated under the principle of Union Law. William O. Douglas wrote in his book "The Anatomy of Liberty" that "Equal protection under the law is the most important single principle that any nation can take as its ideal. Those who practice it have a strength and unity that other nations lack. A sense of belonging is perhaps the most important community attitude a people can have".

Composed of a unique legal framework, the concept of Union Law is created by the Treaties of the European Union, which the European Court of Justice (ECJ) is decisively empowered to rule over. Nevertheless, the national court systems of member states are the essential legal autonomous bodies which are primarily responsible for implementing the principles of Union Law. Accordingly, member states are responsible for generating a transparent judicial system that is able to rule efficiently under provisions of Union Law. For this to occur, the judicial system of each member state must meet EU criteria and be organized in a fashion that corresponds with EU policies. Thus it becomes clear that ECJ is only a form of reference for the court systems of member states, and a line of last resort.

== Study on Romanian Court Rationalization ==
The Romanian Ministry of Justice in conjunction with the Superior Council of Magistracy of Romania conducted a study to create an actions plan to implement institutional reforms. In March 2005 a final report isolated specific items that required attention. Along with the help of Terry R. Lord, a judicial specialist, and Jesper Wittrup, a court administration specialist, the "Study on Romanian Court Rationalization" was generated which examined the concerns highlighted by the European Commission. The study also offered some suggestions of ways to initiate reforms.

== Restructuring the District Courts ==
The Study on Romanian Court Rationalization analyzed the current structure of the district court system in part by considering court size, case backlogs, and allocation of judges and clerks by using and comparing population models, case load models, and a Data Envelopment Analysis model. Information gathered and presented determined that the numbers of judges and clerks in Romania grew drastically in the last few years along with the number of cases. The population model numbers show that in Romania there are only 5,000 people per judge. The numbers represent the highest ratios of judges to population among some of Romania's future partners, and current member states of the EU such as France and Italy. Statistical analysis deducted from the case load model shows that an average district court judge handles 400 cases with variance around the country, with 250 cases in some parts and 600 in others.

Although the high numbers of judges and clerks presented in the report, in comparison with other member states of the EU, presents a favorable argument for Romania's current judicial system the increase in the judges and clerks has not eradicated the accumulation of cases waiting to be heard. Instead, the court system adapted to its structure a theme of inefficiency. According to the report, this issue appears to stem in part from the improper allocation of human resources, meaning judges and clerks, which leads to deficiency and imbalance in the equilibrium between cases and judges.

In the modern era of globalization an inefficient, and ultimately an unreliable judicial system, impedes foreign investment which in turn creates economic complication between Romania and the EU. In order for Romania to increase its foreign investment, investors must have faith that the judicial system has the capability to solve disputes quickly and efficiently. Mark Meyer, one of the most noted and accomplished international lawyers, and an adjunct professor of St John's University School of Law, wrote in the Romanian Digest that, "Reforming this system so as to establish efficient and effective access to impartial and independent courts that can attract foreign investment and create confidence in the quality and honesty of the judiciary is of paramount importance to the immediate future of the country".

As a step towards reform the Study on Romanian Court Rationalization suggests that Romania needs to restructure its court system. While the report clearly emphasizes that it can not make assertive conclusions, it does offer constructive suggestions that establish a foundation for an action plan. The report advances the idea of nationalizing a system, similar to that of Netherlands, Sweden, Finland, and Denmark, that would evaluate the degree of difficulty of a case. This tool would allow decision makers to distribute judges and clerks in proximity to the number of cases. This would contribute towards eliminating the problem of understaffing or overstaffing a particular court. The task of putting together such a system would fall on the shoulders of the Superior Council for the Magistracy. An additional measure in restructuring the district court system particularly would be, the report proposes, to eliminate 28 small courts and redraw the jurisdiction boundaries to include the new areas, combine 12 small courts into 6 larger courts, unite 14 small courts with existing larger courts, and examine the possibilities of dealing with 26 other courts.

=== Budget Increase ===
Further reform efforts were addressed by the Study on Romanian Court Rationalization in the area of investment and budget management. The report recommends that a policy that would institute an increased fixed budget for the Romanian judicial system would be a great step towards a well rounded reform. The budget for the judicial branch of government was increased by 18% from EUR 362 million to EUR 403 million. The report recognizes that for the institution of justice to advance, the budget must continue to be increased to account for more buildings as well as for additional judges, clerks, and other administrative staff. It is also suggested by the report that investment is also necessary in the court IT system. Emphasis is added by the Study on Romanian Court Rationalization that the Information Technology area of the judicial reform is critical.

According to The Study on Romanian Court Rationalization another matter awaiting budgetary reform is the method by which the court budgets are allocated by the Romanian Ministry of Justice. Since courts do not have any power to transfer funds as they see fit once the funding is received, they do not have incentives to save money in some areas in order to use it in other areas. One way of dealing with this matter that is suggested by the study, is to deregulate current policies which would create flexibility in budget management and, in addition, create an administrative accounting position.

== IT Strategy For The Reform Of The Judiciary 2005-2009 ==
"The IT Strategy For The Reform Of The Judiciary (2005-2009)" issued by the Romanian Ministry of Justice is part of a massive effort of the Romanian government to modernize the judicial system. The IT strategy reports that an omnipresent IT framework will affect efficiency and independence of the courts, human resources management, and aid in combating corruption.

=== Modernizing the Court System ===
To accomplish its comprehensive reform, the "IT Strategy For The Reform Of The Judiciary" lists that it is still "creating a secured IT network and interconnecting all institutions of the judicial system, implementing a joint security policy within the entire judicial system, creating an electronic unitary and efficient system for registering the court sessions, hearing the withheld identity witnesses and distance hearing of the imprisoned detainees, interconnect the IT integrated judicial system with the other IT systems within the public service nationwide and at the European level.” These pressing challenges will continue to require the steady cooperation and increased funding of the Romanian government.

== National Anti-Corruption Strategy 2001-2004 ==
In order for restructure of the Romanian judicial system to be deemed complete, combating corruption has also been a major agenda item for the Romanian government. The "National Anticorruption Strategy (2005-2007)" provides the basis for the reform policies for Romanian leaders such as Romania's Prime Minister and the Ministry of Justice. This strategy isolated a few changes in policies that are necessary to overcome the obstacle of widespread corruption.

=== Changes Within The Prosecutor's Office ===
The National Anti-Corruption Strategy states that the independent audit performed by Freedom House helped highlight a core element that undermines the states role in the judicial process, that being the hierarchical organization of the prosecutor's office. To eliminate this problem action was taken by "establishing objective criteria for the initial assignment of cases to public prosecutors, restricting the possibilities for cases to be reassigned or taken over hierarchically, to situations expressly and exhaustively provided for in the law, introducing the court control on all the acts of invalidation adopted by the hierarchically superior public prosecutors upon request from the public prosecutors who perform the investigations". Further implementation will occur which will give a prosecutor absolute control over the investigation conducted by the judicial police. Additionally, there will be an intensification of communication between the prosecutors investigating organized crime and corruption offenses and the intelligence agencies.

=== Changes Within The Superior Council Of Magistracy ===
Further combating measures presented by the National Anti-Corruption Strategy are focused on disengaging any Superior Council of Magistracy members from holding positions in the prosecutor's office, giving SCM members a lifetime office, and introducing policies requiring members of the SCM to be accountable for their actions through an annual report. Lastly, there is determination to demilitarize the Directorate General for Protection and Anticorruption and downgrade it to an investigation unit within the Romanian Ministry of Justice (the Directorate was disbanded in 2006).
