= Detașamentul Special de Protecție și Intervenție =

- DSPI soldiers during an exercise
- Active: 1990-Present
- Country: Romania
- Branch: General Directorate for Defense Intelligence
- Type: Special forces
- Role: Counter-terrorism, Reconnaissance, Explosives, VIP Protection
- Size: About 145
- Nickname: DSPI/DIR

Commanders
- Current commander: Colonelul Petre Măruntu

Detașamentul Special de Protecție și Intervenție (DSPI, The Special Detachment of Protection and Intervention, ex-Detașamentul de Intervenție Rapidă, DIR) of the Romanian Ministry of Defense is an elite special operations unit of the Romanian military.

== History ==
During the early 1990s, a very small special operations (SOF) detachment was born within the Romanian military. It was incorporated in what was at that time the 30th Guard Brigade, or Brigada 30 Gardă "Mihai Viteazul".

Referred to simply as "the special operations subunit", this small detachment was relatively unknown, even among armed forces personnel. In a few years, the unit was renamed Detașamentul pentru Protecția Demnitarilor Militari (DPDM, "Detachment for the Protection of Military Dignitaries"). DPDM continued to be part of the 30th Guard Brigade. In 1998, the same year when the top-secret Grupul Antiterorist of the Foreign Intelligence Service (SIE) was born, the DPDM was given its current name, Detașamentul de Intervenție Rapidă, and starting with 2009 was renamed into "Detașamentul Special de Protecție și Intervenție".

In 2000, DSPI was moved again, from the 30th Guard Brigade to the Military Police. This was followed 5 years later by the reduction of the 30th Guard Brigade and its transformation into a regiment. The number of DSPI operatives continued to grow, and the detachment reached company-size soon (145 members in 2003).

In December 2003, the military, which had kept the detachment secret for six years, unveiled it in a public show on television. DSPI was presented as being a small detachment of carefully selected operatives used mainly to protect military VIPs in Romania, as well as foreign VIPs visiting the country. However, when interviewed by a reporter, a DSPI operative stated that he had participated in several operations abroad, along with similar units from other NATO countries. Captain Arthur Elisei also suggested that DSPI has been partially modeled after the British SAS; the detachment has also trained with the Israeli Sayeret Mat'kal and Italy's GIS (Gruppo di Intervento Speciale).

== Organization ==
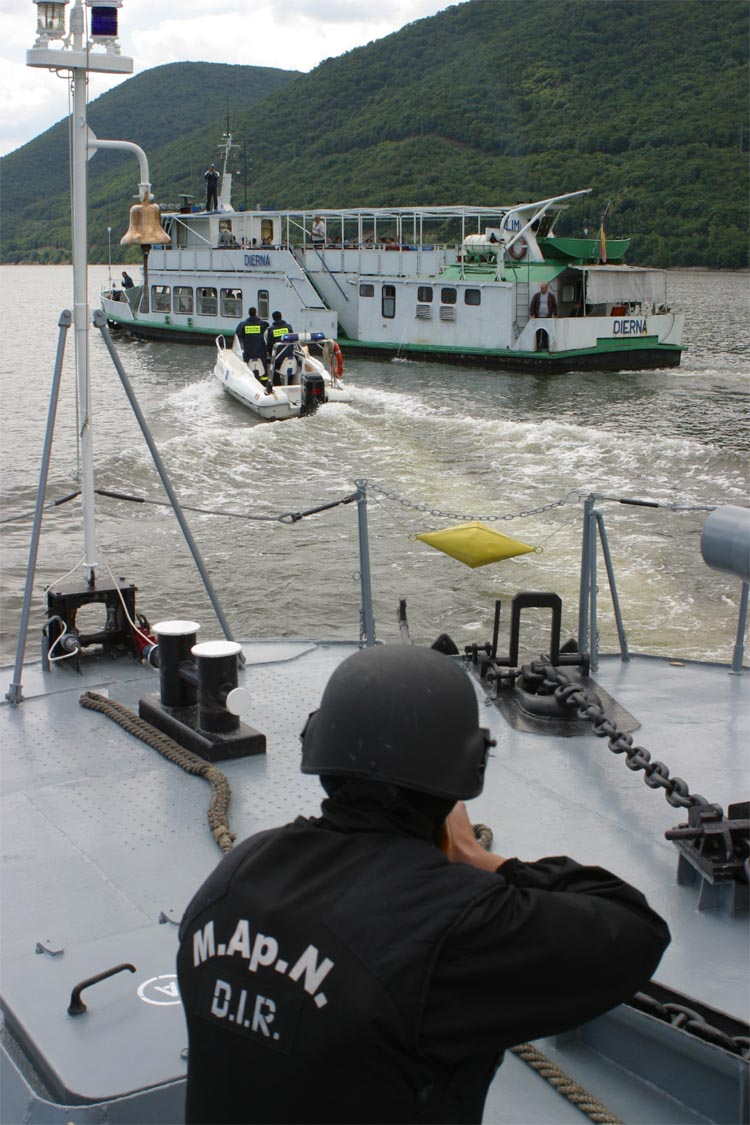

DSPI is a special unit inside the military, and is formed of highly skilled individuals. A very large percentage of its members are champions in martial arts, kickboxing, athletic disciplines and so on. DSPI was, until December 2003, top secret.

DSPI operatives operate both in small 4- or 6-man teams and in larger teams, depending on the task to be performed. Although the detachment's main missions are VIP protection and anti-terrorist intervention, the unit is also capable of hostage rescue, airborne/seaborne assault and DA (Direct Action), which make it the Romanian equivalent of the British SAS, US Army's Delta Force or Israel's "Sayeret Mat'kal".

DSPI is one of the three structures composing the Special Operations Command (created in 2005), the others being PSY OPS unit and the Batalionul 1 Operații Speciale (Special Forces Battalion).

Present, Detașamentul Special de Protecție și Intervenție is part of structure of the Direcția Generală de Informații a Apărării.

== Weapons ==
Despite Romania being a NATO member, DSPI operatives continue to often sport AK-47 rifles when engaged in public events; however they are also equipped with a host of other weapons which are used according to the mission objectives:

- Assault Rifles: M16A2, FNC Short, SG551, H&K 33E, G3, C7.
- Sub-Machine gun: Mini UZI, MP5 - standard for anti-terrorist engagements, FN P90.
- Support Weapons: Heckler & Koch G3-SG1 and PSG-1, Mauser customized with 86SR and 93 SR, CZ 700 sniper rifle.
- Special equipment: Browning MK III pistol, H&K P8 pistol, Colt Smart Gun EP1 pistol.
