= Tudor Rareș Pop =

Romanian politician (born 1980)

Member of the Chamber of Deputies
- Incumbent
- Assumed office 21 December 2016
- Constituency: Bucharest

Personal details
- Born: 29 November 1980 (age 45)
- Party: Save Romania Union

Tudor Rareș Pop (born 29 November 1980) is a Romanian politician of the Save Romania Union. Since 2016, he has been a member of the Chamber of Deputies. In 2021, he was proposed as minister of youth and sports in the rejected cabinet of Dacian Cioloș. Since 2024, he has served as a quaestor of the chamber.
