= Irineu Darău =

Romanian politician (born 1986)

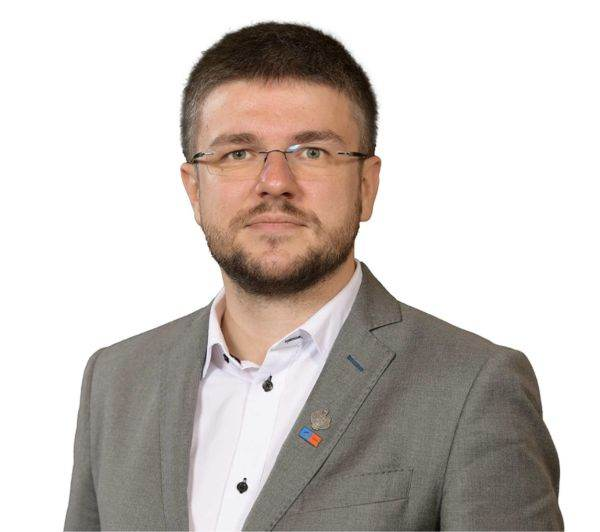
- Darău in 2021

Minister of Economy, Digitalisation, Entrepreneurship, and Tourism
- In office 23 December 2025 – 20 October 2026
- Prime Minister: Ilie Bolojan
- Preceded by: Radu-Dinel Miruță
- Succeeded by: Daniel Zamfir

Personal details
- Born: 12 October 1986 (age 40) Sighetu Marmației, Maramureș County, Romania
- Party: Save Romania Union

Ambrozie-Irineu Darău (born 12 October 1986) is a Romanian politician serving as minister of economy since 2025. He has been a member of the Senate since 2020.
