= Penal Code of Romania =

Romanian criminal code

The Penal Code of Romania (Codul penal al României) is a document providing the legal basis regarding criminal law in Romania. The Code contains 446 articles. The articles mention aspects such as the national boundaries of law and the crimes that fall under the incidence of penal law. Judicial discretion is granted by the Code through the use of minimum and maximum sentences. The most recent version of the Romanian Penal Code has come into effect on 1 February 2014.

In the modern history of Romania, there have been four criminal codes, the first three codes being associated with the rulings of Alexandru Ioan Cuza, Carol II and Nicolae Ceaușescu respectively, and the current code being based on a modernized understanding of the law, within the European context, in the 21st century. Each of these codes had been modified several times after their enactment, including in connection with a change of political regime, such as the installation of the communist regime after World War II, and the fall of the communist regime after the Romanian Revolution of 1989.

== History ==
=== The Penal Code of 1865 ===
The Romanian Penal Code was first issued in 1865, under the leadership of A.I. Cuza. The Code (also known as the Cuza Code) standardized the laws of the Principality of Wallachia and Principality of Moldova, which since 1859 were united under a single Principality. The Code has been developed using several notions from the Penal Code of France and the Penal Code of Prussia. The Cuza Code included the principle of legal equality. Instead of the capital punishment, the most extreme punishment that could be legally enforced was penal labor. Cruel and unusual punishments were prohibited.

Based on the Code, crimes were classified under three headings: delicts, misdemeanors and contraventions. The concept of attempted crimes was not mentioned throughout the code; attempting to commit a crime was punished just as harshly as if the crime happened. The accomplice was to receive the same punishment as the author of the crime.

The Code did not criminalize prostitution. Cannabis consumption was not a punishable offense.

The Penal Code of 1865 marked the beginning of unitary penal law in Romania.

=== The Penal Code of 1936 ===
The Penal Code of 1936 (also known as The Penal Code of Carol II) was introduced in order to standardize the many changes in the legal system that have arisen as a result of the Union of 1918. The new Code was heavily updated; the presumption of innocence was expressly mentioned. The sentence was defined as being given in order to punish the crime, not the person committing it. The concept of individual punishments (as opposed to collective punishment) has been introduced in the Code.

The Penal Code of 1936 remained unchanged in terms of complicity to crime.

The 1936 penal code applied nationwide, providing for the first time a unitary legislation on the territory of Romania, replacing the Hungarian Penal Code (known as The Csemegi Code) which had been in force in Transylvania since 1880, and the Austrian Penal Code (promulgated under Emperor Franz Josef I) which had been in force in Bukovina since 1852.

After the communists came into power, they made several changes to the Code, in accordance with communist ideology, but the Code remained in force until January 1, 1969, when the new Ceaușescu Penal Code replaced it.

=== The Penal Code of 1969 ===
The Penal Code of 1969 has been developed under Nicolae Ceaușescu and in accordance to Marxist ideals. Capital punishment was a lawful punishment. Parasitism has been introduced as a legal offense. Homosexual acts were classified as a criminal offense.

Nonetheless, the Code retained the presumption of innocence. The Code was now expressly mentioning the concept of complicity to crime. It also included specific definitions of infraction, attempt, perjury, rape, bribe, prostitution, war propaganda and theft.

==== Post-1989 amendments ====
The Penal Code after the Romanian Revolution of 1989 has been updated 29 times as of December 2008. Capital punishment was replaced with life imprisonment, as the post-Communist Constitution of Romania outlaws the death penalty. Many changes were made to the Ceauşescu Code in the 1990 - 2014 period, in order to rid it of communist ideology and modernize it, including with regard to domestic violence and the framework of the sexual offenses chapter, with changes including the decriminalization of parasitism, adultery and homosexual relationships

The Code was also republished in 1997. In post-communist Romania, reforms to the 1969 criminal code have gone in several directions. On one hand, several offenses were decriminalized, as they were seen as outdated, or otherwise inappropriate for a democratic society. On the other hand, the punishments for several violent offences against the person have become more severe, due to societal concern about violence during the difficult transition period.

=== The Penal Code of 2014 ===
A new Penal Code (Law no. 286/2009) came into force on 1 February 2014, together with a new Penal Procedure Code. According to official explanatory notes released prior to its implementation, the new legislation aimed to simplify and accelerate criminal proceedings, eliminate overlaps between Penal Code provisions and those contained in special laws, transpose European regulations into national law and ensure the observance of human rights provisions contained by the Constitution and various international treaties signed by Romania. In this context, the code redefined the concept of criminal offences, adjusted prison sentences, amended the mechanisms by which criminal fines are calculated, eliminated prison sentences for juvenile offenders (replacing them with educational measures) and introduced new offences against persons, property, justice and professional conduct. Prostitution was decriminalized.

=== Structure ===
The code is divided into a General Part and a Special Part. The former contains general provisions on offences, penalties, criminal liability, the status of minors, security measures, and prescription, while the latter regulates individual offences, which are grouped into twelve titles, plus an additional title comprising final provisions. Compared to the Code of 1969, the new code is longer, comprising 446 articles versus its predecessor's 363.

== See also ==
- Law of Romania
- Criminal code
- Penal Procedure Code of Romania
