= Steluța-Gustica Cătăniciu =

Romanian politician

Member of the Chamber of Deputies
- Incumbent
- Assumed office 2016
- Constituency: no.13 Cluj

Personal details
- Born: 19 February 1963 (age 63)
- Party: National Liberal Party

Steluța-Gustica Cătăniciu (born 19 February 1963) is a Romanian politician who is member of the Chamber of Deputies, the lower house of the Romanian parliament.

== Biography ==
Cătăniciu entered parliament in 2016.
