= Civil procedure code of Romania =

The Civil Procedure Code of Romania (Romanian: Codul de procedură civilă al României) is the law regulating civil procedure in Romania. It came into force on 15 February 2013 as Law no. 134/2010, implemented through Law no. 76/2012, replacing the old Civil Procedure Code of 1865. As a transitional measure, some of the Code's provisions came into force on 1 January 2016.

== Background and implementation ==
The civil procedure code is the result of a major legal reform which began in the mid-2000s, prior to Romania's accession to the European Union. It was designed in such a way as to simplify and accelerate civil proceedings, following repeated condemnations of Romania by the European Court of Human Rights for breaching the standards of a fair civil trial as established by the ECHR. To this end, new mechanisms were introduced to ensure an optimal and predictable duration of trials, as well as remedying a perceived inconsistency of Romanian case law.

The code came into force two years after a new civil code was also implemented, and thus it also aimed to align civil proceedings with the new substantive law.

Despite a number of transitional issues, the 2015 Cooperation and Verification Mechanism report on Romania found that the new codes led to a decline in trial length to an average of 1.5 years. According to the same report there was also a reduction in the judiciary's overall workload, with tribunals and courts of appeal experiencing a 17% decline in the number of cases.

== Contents ==
The code comprises a preliminary title and seven books (cărţi) which include provisions on contentious and non-contentious proceedings, arbitration, enforcement, special procedures (such as divorce and partition) and international civil lawsuits. The books are further divided into titles, chapters and sections.

== See also ==
- Law of Romania
- Civil code of Romania
