= Civil Code of Romania =

The Civil Code of Romania (Codul civil al României, commonly referred to as Noul Cod Civil – the New Civil Code, officially Law no. 287/2009 on the Civil Code) is the basic source of civil law in Romania. It was adopted by Parliament on 17 July 2009 and came into force on 1 October 2011. It replaced the Civil Code of 1865 as well as the Commercial Code of 1887 and the Family Code of 1954.

== Background ==
The Civil Code was drafted together with new penal and procedural codes as part of a major effort to reform Romania's legal system after the country's accession to the European Union. An impact study contracted by the Ministry of Justice concluded that the Civil Code was the least difficult to implement of the four new codes, but nevertheless the process was criticized by parts of the Romanian judiciary and civil society for lacking adequate preparatory measures to ensure a smooth transition. The code was adopted in 2009 after extensive parliamentary debate, published in an amended version in the Official Gazette on 15 July 2011, and came into force on 1 October 2011 via the adoption of Law no. 71/2011 on the implementation of the Civil Code.

== Contents ==
The code is divided into a preliminary title and seven books (cărţi), which contain provisions on persons, family, property, successions, obligations, prescription and private international law. The code was developed in line with the monist principle of concentrating private law regulations into a single code, including commercial regulations, and was inspired primarily by the Civil Code of Switzerland and the Civil Code of Quebec.

== See also ==
- Civil code
- Law of Romania
- Civil procedure code of Romania
