= Direcția Generală de Protecție și Anticorupție =

Secret service of the Ministry of Justice of Romania

General Directorate for Protection and Anti-corruption
- Direcția Generală de Protecție și Anticorupție (DGPA)

Agency overview
- Formed: 2004
- Preceding agency: Internal Service for Protection and Anti-corruption Serviciul Intern de Protecţie şi Anticorupţie (SIPA)
- Dissolved: 2006
- Type: Secret service
- Status: Disbanded
- Parent department: Ministry of Justice of Romania

Direcţia Generală de Protecţie şi Anticorupţie (General Directorate for Protection and Anti-corruption, DGPA; known before as Serviciul Intern de Protecţie şi Anticorupţie- Internal Service for Protection and Anti-corruption, SIPA) was the secret service of the Ministry of Justice of Romania.

It was disbanded in 2006 by Justice Minister Monica Macovei.

== See also ==
- Serviciul Român de Informaţii (SRI)
- Serviciul de Informaţii Externe (SIE)
- Serviciul de Protecţie şi Pază (SPP)
- Serviciul de Telecomunicaţii Speciale (STS)
- Direcția Generală Anticorupție (DGA)
- Direcţia Generală de Informaţii a Apărării (DGIA)
- Direcţia Generală de Informaţii şi Protecţie Internă (DGIPI)
