= Stângă =

Stângă is a Romanian surname, a spelling variant of Stîngă. Notable people with the surname include:

- Florin Stângă, Romanian footballer
- George-Cătălin Stângă, Romanian politician
