= League of Romanian Students Abroad =

Romanian non-governmental organization

- Liga Studenților Români din Străinătate
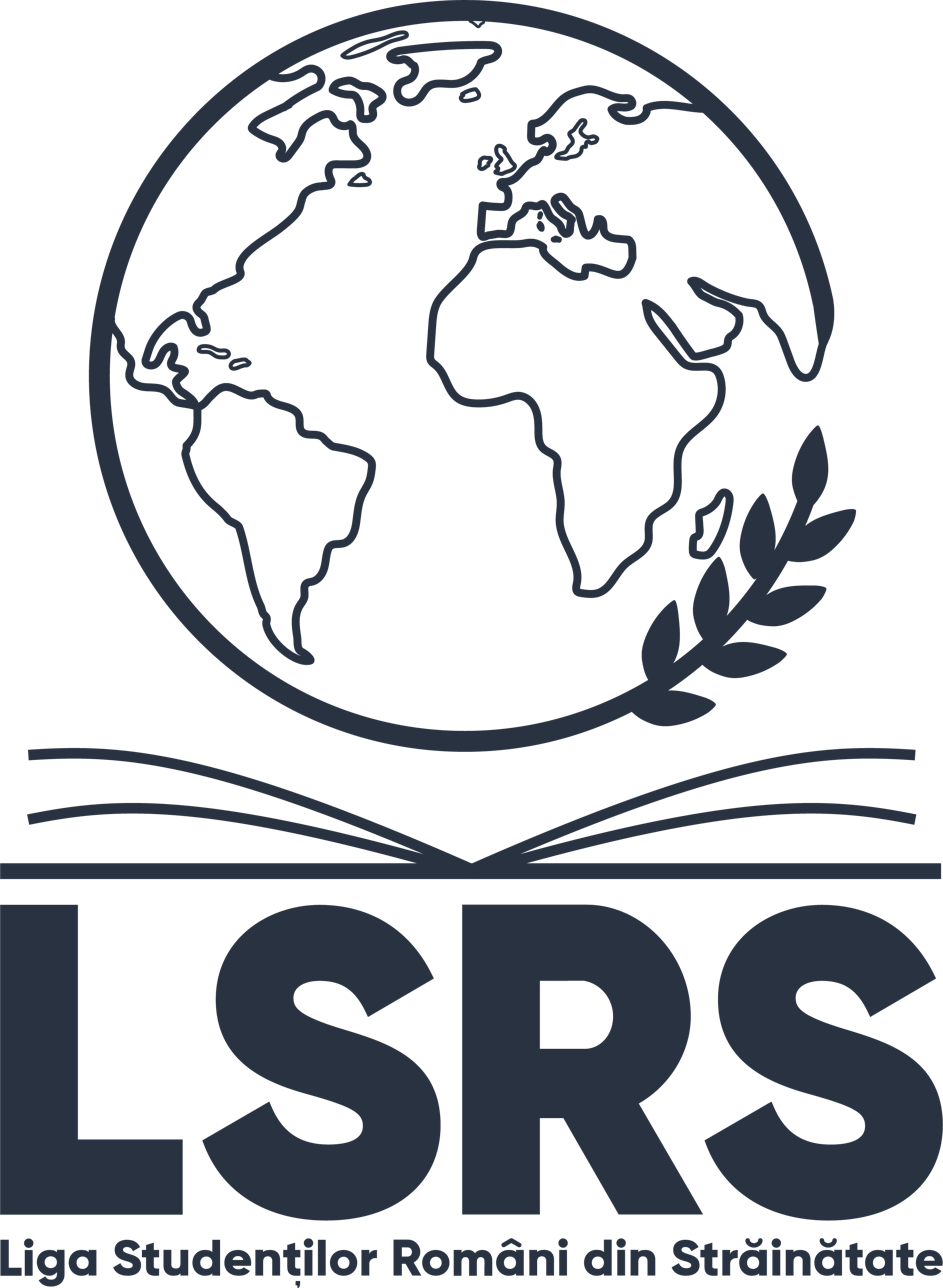
- Abbreviation: LSRS
- Formation: January 8, 2009
- Location(s): Romania & Worldwide
- Members: Approx. 14,000 (as of 2024)
- Official language: Romanian, English
- President: Otilia Apostol (Erasmus University Rotterdam)
- General Secretary: Andrada Balmez (University of Cologne)
- Website: lsrs.ro

The League of Romanian Students Abroad (LSRS; Romanian: Liga Studenţilor Români din Străinătate) is a non-profit, non-governmental, politically neutral organization led by Romanian students and graduates of universities around the world. It is one of the few organizations of its kind, specifically grouping Romanians who want to study, are studying, or have studied abroad.

The main goal of LSRS is to develop the community of Romanian students and graduates of universities around the world, facilitating their contribution to Romania's democratic future. LSRS affirms that highly trained, young Romanians represent a strategic resource for the country's development and should be promoted within society as decisive factors for Romania's future success.

== History ==
LSRS was founded by two Romanian students, Sebastian Burduja (Harvard University) and Costin Elefteriu (King's College London), in January 2009, who perceived a need to organize the ever-growing community of Romanians studying abroad. Nowadays, this community numbers tens of thousands of people. LSRS is one of the fastest growing Romanian non-profits, gathering over 14,000 members (defined as registered users of their website) after one and a half decades of activity across the globe. It has signed an official Memorandum with the Romanian Senate, granting it special recognition from Romanian authorities and acknowledging, for the first time, the potential of Romanian students abroad.

Since its founding it has grown into the main organisation of representation abroad of undergraduate and graduate students of Romanian nationality, and has achieved cooperation and recognition with and from the Romanian Government, Romanian diplomatic missions, The European Parliament, The Romanian Academy, multiple private sector actors such as KPMG, BRD, Kaufland or Rotary International.

A history of its press releases, that track the organisation's evolution, may be found on the official LSRS website.

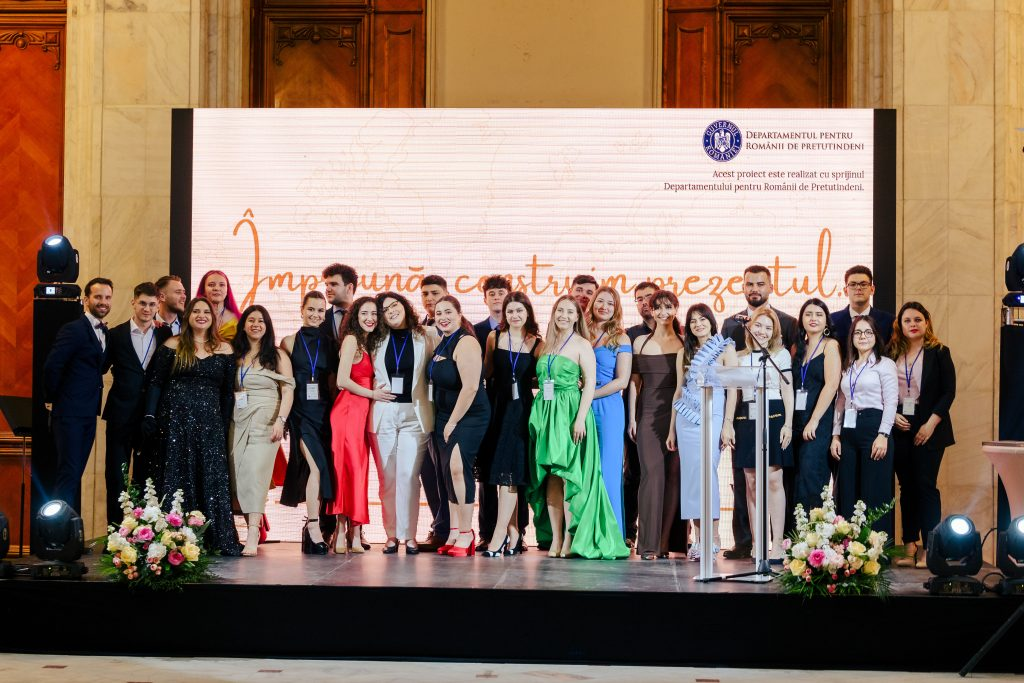
LSRS 2023 Gala at the Palace of the Romanian Parliament in Bucharest

== Organization ==
LSRS is organized into branches on four continents. In 2024, there were 16 active branches, spanning most Western European countries, but also Turkey, China, Saudi Arabia, South Korea and others. Branches are headed by Coordinators, who have nearly complete control over the activities of the branch. The general direction is set by Coordinators together with the executive committee and the Director's Council. The Director's Council gathers the President, the Secretary General, and five Vice-presidents: Internal Relations, External Relations, Projects, Treasury, and Communications. The League is defined by a strong organizational culture. Members and volunteers commonly form strong bonds through shared interests, augumented by regular activities organised by the League, such as teambuilding exercises, conferences, reunions and academic and leisure trips.

== Activities ==
LSRS has undertaken a wide variety of projects on a national and international scale. It seeks to promote good relations with other countries, supporting Romania's image around the world through the activities of its branches. Every year, LSRS branches around the world organize small and medium-sized events to promote Romanian culture and traditions. The main celebrations take place on December 1 of every year, Romania's National Day. At the same time, LSRS organizes projects in Romania. The “LSRS Caravan” takes Romanian students and alumni from abroad on a journey through Romanian high schools and colleges. There they provide advice and counseling for facilitating the admission of new students to top foreign universities.

Equally important, the League organizes an annual Gala of Romanian Academic Excellence, offering prizes to the best and the brightest Romanian students abroad. The event routinely gathers around 800–1000 participants and on multiple occasions it was held in the prestigious Palace of the Parliament (Palatul Parlamentului). The League's policy is to invite civil society activists, journalists, politicians as representatives of the State, as well as representatives of the private sector and members of academia. For instance, Romania's Foreign Minister Teodor Baconschi was present in 2011, along with Mircea Geoana, President of the Romanian Senate, and Crin Antonescu, President of the National Liberal Party. The event has been tremendously successful in 2010–2011. The 2011 winner, Cristina Ghenoiu, is a world-leading specialist in cancer research at the Rockefeller Center. In Europe, Graduate Student of the Year went to a talented researcher called Radu Beleca from Brunel University. Another winner is Cristina Grigore, Romanian Fulbright Alumna at Vanderbilt University.

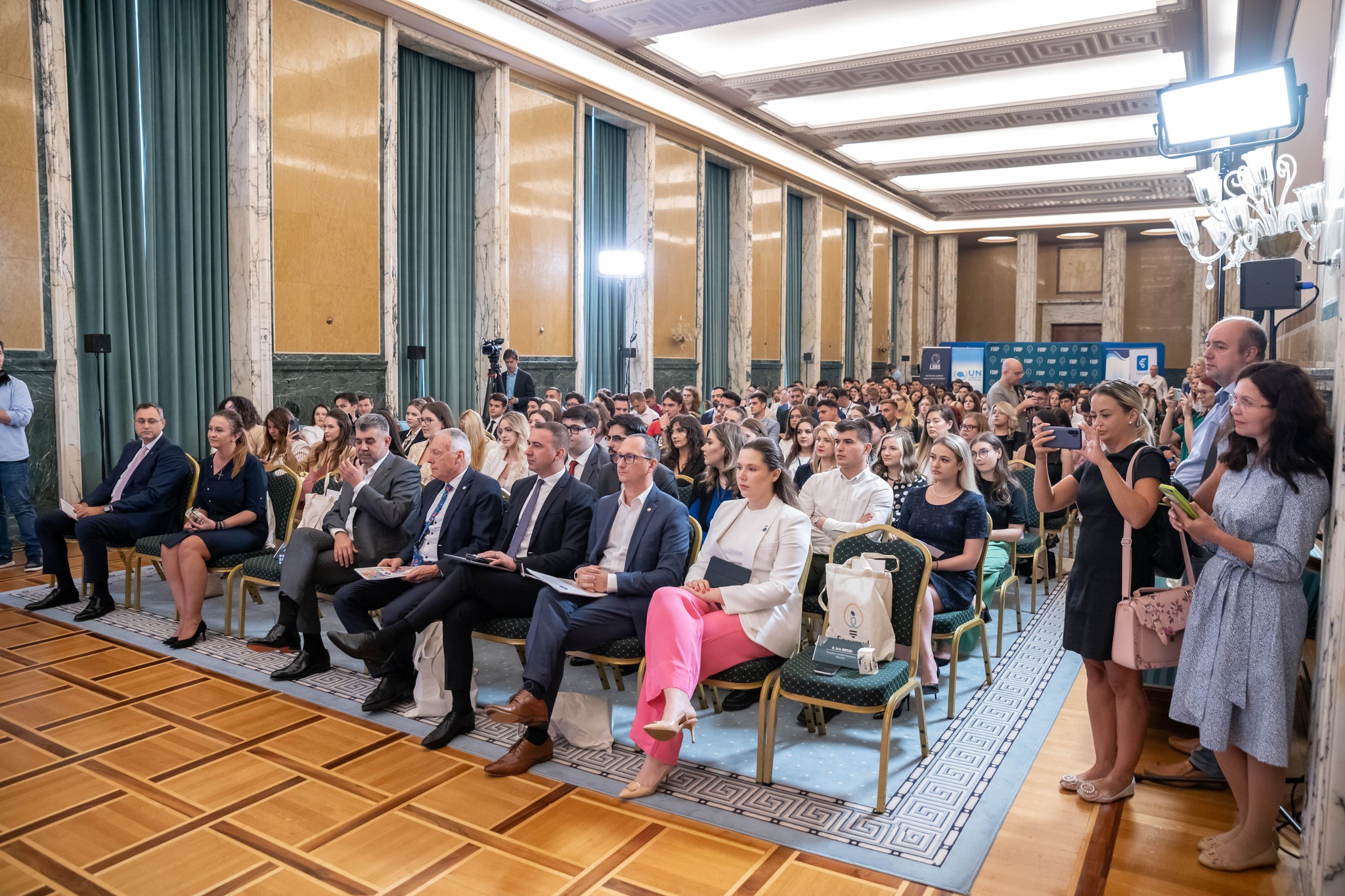
Forum of Romanian Students, at the Academy of Economic Studies, Bucharest

LSRS also organized a Conference on Sustainable Development in the Black Sea Region, together with the United Nations Development Programme (UNDP), bringing together students, diplomats, and scholars to explore new development solutions.

In 2010, LSRS spoke out on the controversial subject of Rosia Montana, protesting against the potential mining operations by pointing out the environmental costs involved. The subject is still being debated in Romania as of February 2011.

More recently, in 2023, LSRS launched the ''Future of Europe'' Conference format, held at the European Parliament in Brussels, Belgium, gathering members of the European public, private and academic areas to discuss topics of importance for the future of the European Union. The topic of the 2023 Conference was ''Future of European Law''. The topic of the 2024 Conference will be ''Harmony in Diversity: Sustainable Policy-Making in the EU''.

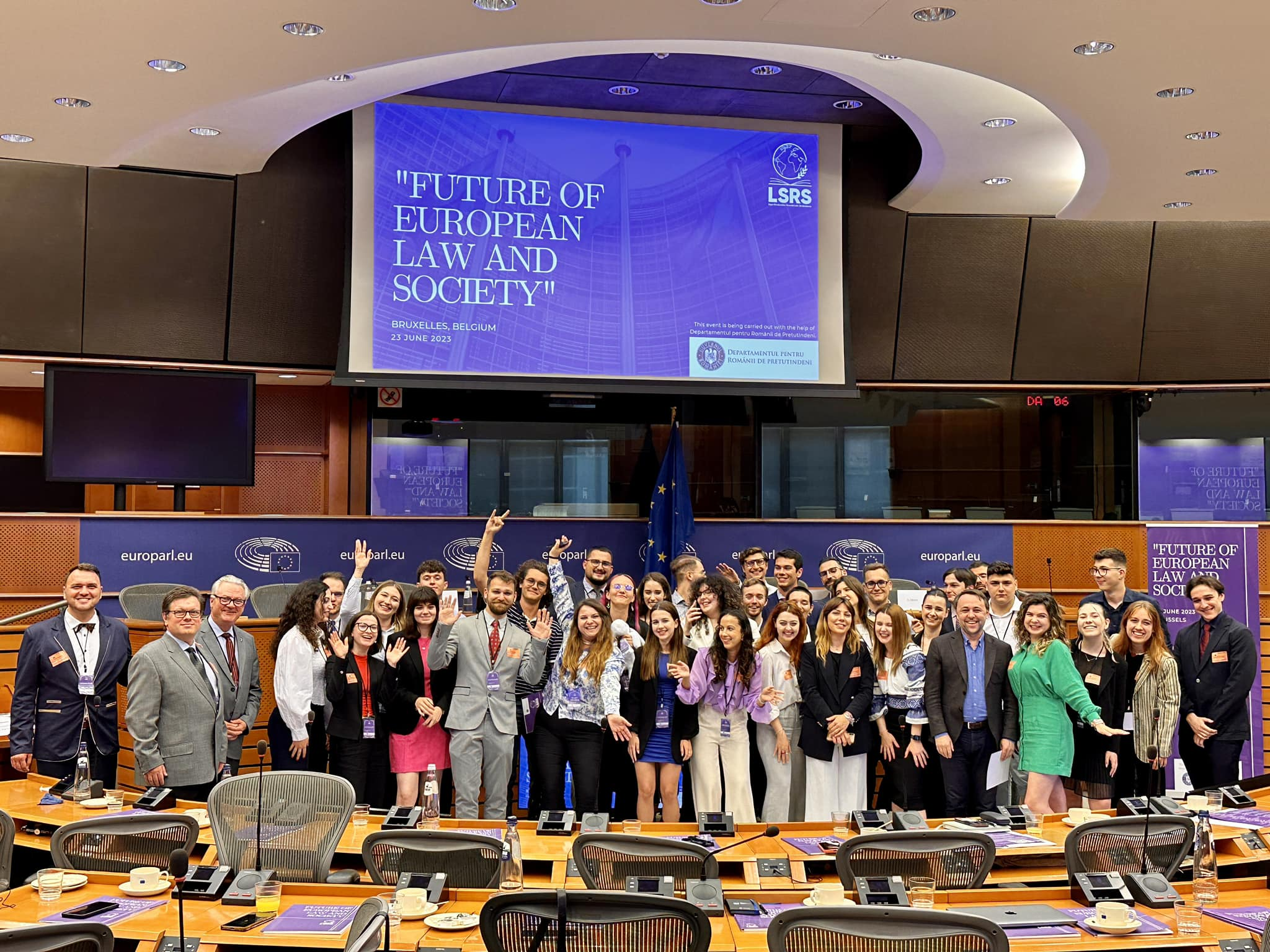
Future of European Law Conference, 2023, European Parliament, Brussels

LSRS seeks to defend and promote the legal rights and academic, professional, social, and cultural interests of its members, and smoothens up the path toward a prosperous and democratic Romania. LSRS has been created for Romanian students and graduates abroad, as well as for other Romanians interested in studying outside their home country.

== Media appearances ==
LSRS has had appearances in the Romanian media – TV, online, newspapers – among which Mediafax – Celebration of Romania's National Day (in Romanian), Adevărul – Interview with the founders of LSRS (in Romanian), and Diaspora Business Live – LSRS Library, by LSRS Denmark (in Romanian)

More recently, it had important successful partnerships with major official Romanian media outlets such as TVR, Radio România Internațional, and Agerpres.
