= George-Cătălin Stângă =

Romanian politician

Member of the Chamber of Deputies
- Incumbent
- Assumed office 21 December 2016
- Constituency: no.18 GALATI

Personal details
- Born: 1982 (age 43–44)
- Party: National Liberal Party

George-Cătălin Stângă is a Romanian politician, who is member of the Chamber of Deputies.

== Biography ==
He was elected in 2016 and re-elected in 2020.
