= Ministry of National Defence (Romania) =

Government ministry of Romania

- Ministerul Apărării Naționale
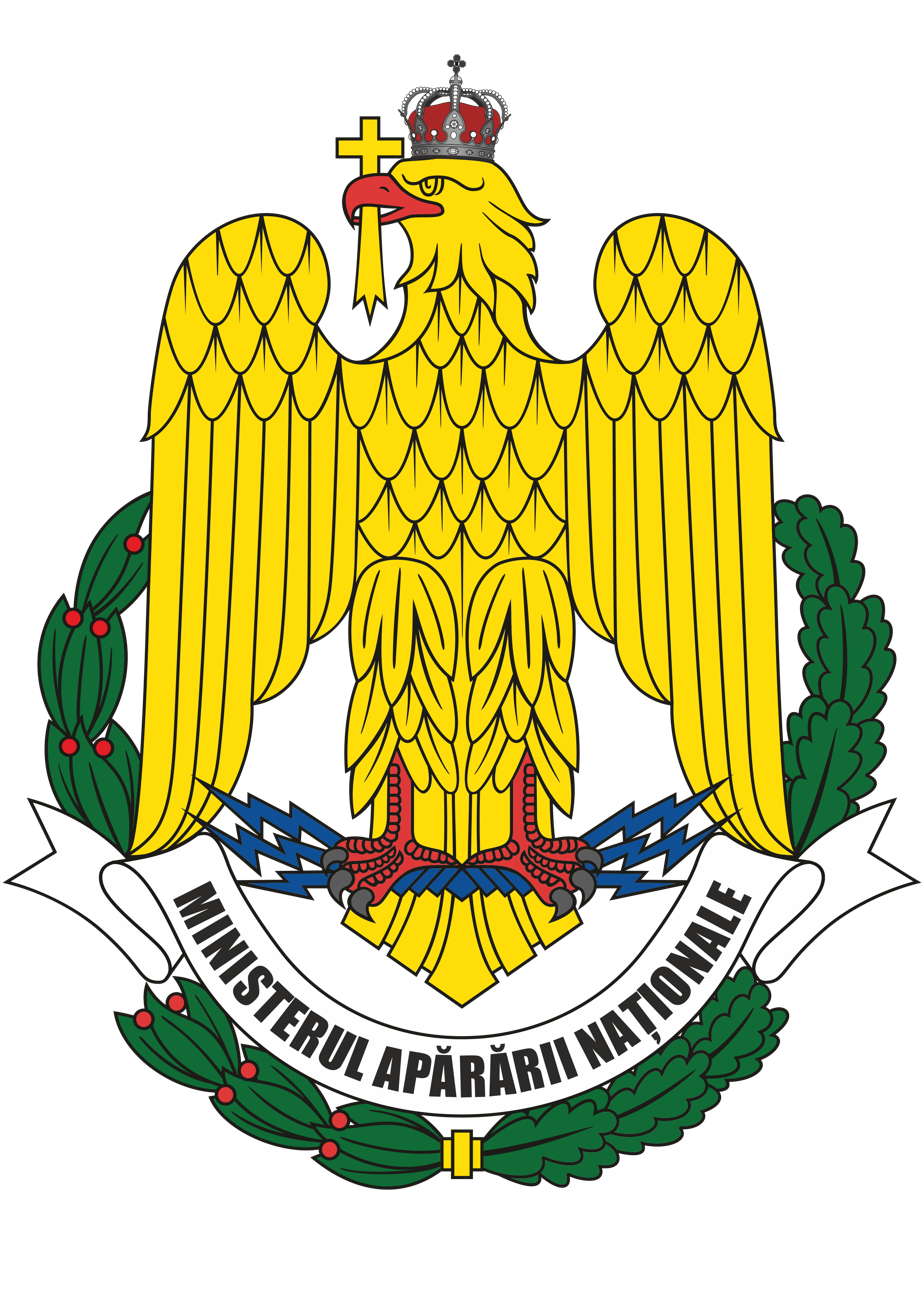
- Coat of arms of the Romanian Ministry of Defence

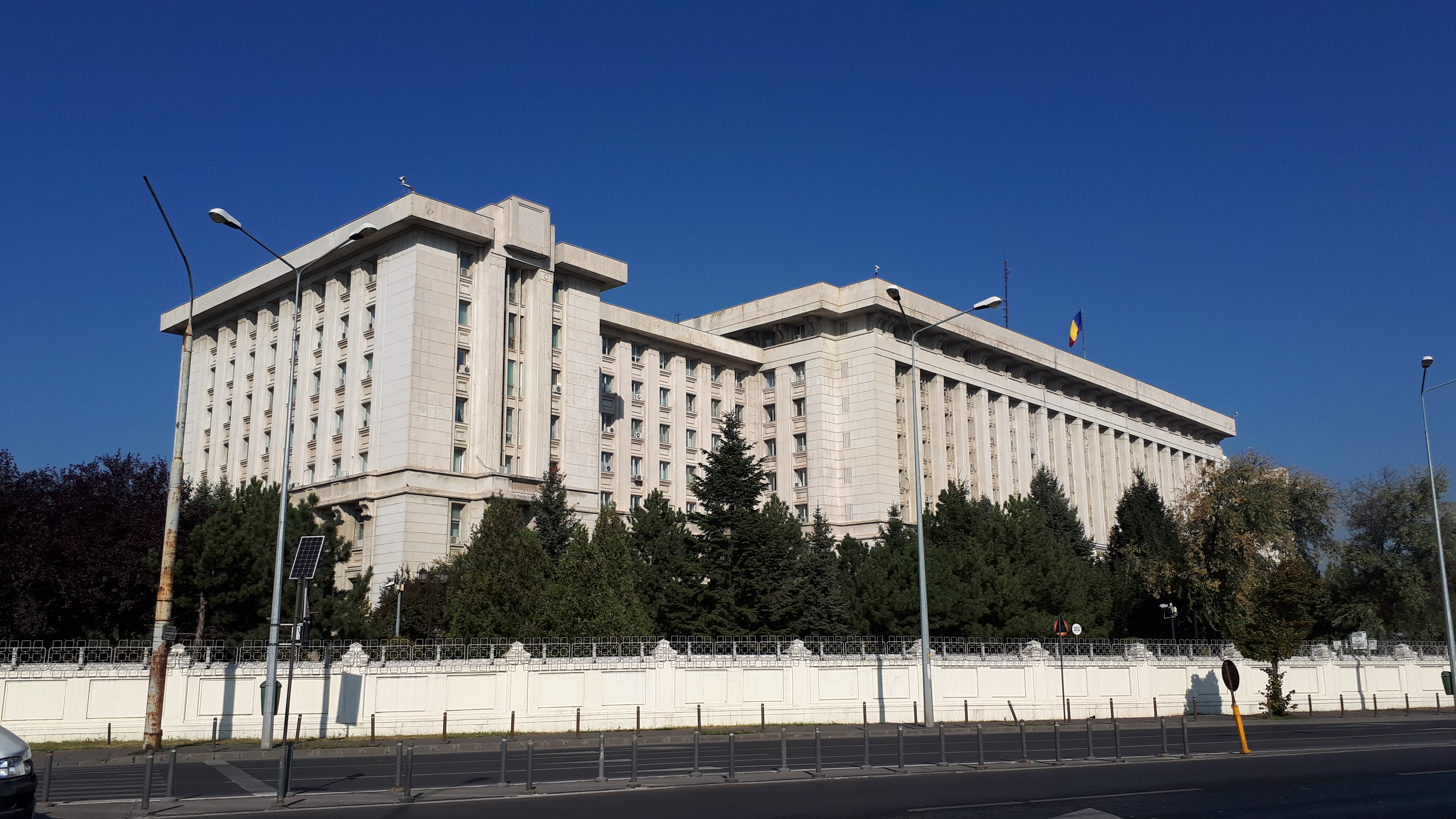
- Headquarters of the ministry in central Bucharest

Agency overview
- Formed: 28 November 1858
- Jurisdiction: Government of Romania
- Headquarters: Strada Izvor 13–15, Sector 5, Bucharest; 44°25′39.9″N 26°4′37.4″E
- Minister responsible: Radu-Dinel Miruță, Minister of National Defence
- Child agency: Direcția Generală de Informații a Apărării Detașamentul de Intervenție Rapidă
- Website: www.mapn.ro

The Ministry of National Defence (Romanian: Ministerul Apărării Naționale — MApN) is one of the eighteen ministries of the Government of Romania.

The current Minister of National Defence is Radu-Dinel Miruță.

== Ministry ==
Military spending as a percentage of GDP.

The Ministry of National Defence is the specialized body of the central public administration submitted to the Government conducting the national defence activity according to the stipulations of law and to the strategy of national security, with a view to safeguarding national sovereignty, state independence and unity, territorial integrity and constitutional democracy.

The Ministry of National Defence is responsible to the Parliament, the Supreme Council of National Defence and the Government for implementation of provisions of the Constitution, laws in force, decisions of the Supreme Council of National Defence and of the Government, of international treaties ratified by Romania in fields of its activity.

== Structure and function ==
The Ministry of National Defence is structured on central structures. MoND central structures subordinated to the minister of National Defence:

- Department of Euro-Atlantic Integration and Defence Policy

Coordinates the Euro-Atlantic integration process and the development of military international relations, is in charge of the defence policy enforcement, ensures the integrated defence planning and controls the research activity in its area of responsibility.

Department of Relations with the Parliament, Legislative Harmonization and Public Relations, Gabriel Leș

Ensures the relations with the Parliament, other public authorities and NGOs, coordinates the legislative activity, presents the drafts of laws in the Parliament, coordinates the process of harmonization with defence stipulations of the NATO and UE members, coordinates the public relations and the research activity in its area of responsibility.

- Armaments Department

Is in charge with military acquisitions and coordinates the research in its area of responsibility.

- General Staff

Ensures the military management of the Armed Forces, is in charge with the combat capacity of the Armed Forces, fulfills the programs of Euro-Atlantic integration and political-military cooperation for its own structures and controls the research activity in its area of responsibility.

The General Staff is headed by the chief of the General Staff, named by the President of Romania at the suggestion of the minister of National Defence and the Prime Minister's approval.

The chief of the General Staff is the highest military rank in the Armed Forces.

A Committee of chiefs of staffs with deliberative role is established at the General Staff level.

Its organization and function are established by the rule approved by order of the minister of National Defence.

- Inspectorate of the Ministry of National Defence

The structure through which the minister of National Defence exercises the control and evaluates the activities developed in the Armed Forces.

The Inspectorate organizes and controls the environment and labor protection, technical and metrological overwatch.

The Inspectorate is managed by the general inspector designated by order of minister of National Defence.

- General Secretariat

Controls the subordinated directorates and services established by order of minister of National Defence and ensures the secretariat, administrative and protocol works at the minister level.

The General Secretariat is headed by the general secretary, a civil servant, nominalized by order of minister of National Defence.

- Defence Intelligence General Directorate

The specialized structure for gathering, processing, confirming, stocking (filing) and evaluating the internal and external military and non-military risks and threats affecting the national security; also in charge of developing the intelligence security concept, the cryptographic activity and ensuring the geographic data required by the Armed Forces. Defence Intelligence General Directorate is headed by a general director appointed by the decision of the Prime Minister at the recommendation of the Minister of National Defence.

- Human Resources Management Directorate

The specialised structure in elaborating the politics, strategies and rules in professionalised human resources management.

- Financial-Accounting Directorate

The MoND specialized structure ensuring the fulfillment of economic, financial-accounting activities of the minister as the chief accountant.

- Internal Audit Directorate

The specialized structure of endogenous and exposit verifications on patrimony administration and use of the public money according to the criteria of efficiency and economy.

The minister of National Defence also has in his subordination: - counselors of minister; - diplomatic counselor; - minister's cabinet; - control body of the minister. - The Military Courts Directorate and the Military Prosecutor's Section are subordinated to the minister of National Defence only regarding the aspects established by common order of minister of National Defence, minister of Justice and General Prosecutor.

The Ministry of National Defence subordinates the service staffs, commands, directorates, education and research institutes, formations and other structures.

The Ministry of National Defence is led and represented by the minister of National Defence. The minister of National Defence in exercising the leadership is assisted by State Secretaries and chief of the General Staff.

At the Ministry of National Defence level exist: - College of Ministry of National Defence with consultative role; - Council of Defence Planning with deliberative role.

== See also ==
- Romanian Armed Forces
- Direcția Generală de Informații a Apărării
- Detașamentul de Intervenție Rapidă
