= Stîngă =

Stîngă is a Romanian surname, a spelling variant of Stângă. Notable people with the surname include:

- Ovidiu Stîngă (born 1972), Romanian footballer and manager
- Vasile Stîngă (born 1957), Romanian handball player
