= General Directorate for Defense Intelligence =

Romanian military intelligence agency

General Directorate for Defense Intelligence (Direcția Generală de Informații a Apărării, DGIA) is Romanian Armed Forces's military intelligence agency, underneath the Ministry of National Defense.

DGIA is organized into two directorates, a Military Intelligence Brigade and other support units:

- Directorate of Military Intelligence - foreign intelligence (Direcția Informații Militare)
- Directorate of Counterintelligence and Military Security - counter-intelligence (Direcția Contrainformații și Securitate Militară)
- Detașamentul Special de Protecție și Intervenție (DSPI)
- 51st Radioelectronic Center
- NATO HUMINT Centre Of Excellence (HCOE)
- Defense Intelligence Domain Training Center "General Nicolae Condeescu"
- Military Intelligence Brigade "Alexandru Averescu" with four battalions:
  - HUMINT Battalion
  - SIGINT and EW Battalion
  - IMINT Battalion
  - Support Battalion

== See also ==
- Romanian Armed Forces
