= Chamber of Deputies (Romania) =

Lower house of the Parliament of Romania

Chamber of Deputies Camera Deputaților
- 10th legislature

Type
- Type: Lower house of the Parliament of Romania

History
- Founded: 1862
- New session started: 1 September 2021

Leadership
- President: Sorin Grindeanu, PSD since 24 June 2025

Structure
- Seats: 330 (+1 vacant)
- Political groups: Government (92): PSD (92) (Note: PSD (84); PUCL (3); Independent (5)); Supported by (111): PNL (55) (Note: PNL (51); Independent (4)); UDMR (21); National minorities (17) (Note: ALAR (1); AMR (1); CRLR (1); FCER (1); FCR (1); FDGR/DFDR (1); PRPE (1); UAR (1); UBBR (1); UCR (1); UCRR (1); UDSCR (1); UDTTMR (1); UER (1); UPR (1); USR (1); UUR (1)); UPR (16) (Note: POT (6); Independent (10)); Independent (1) (Note: AMT (1)); Opposition (127): AUR (62) (Note: AUR (61); Independent (1)); USR (40); SOS RO (13); Independent (13) (Note: UNIT (4); RO.AS.IT. (1); Independent (8))
- Committees: 24: – Committee for Economic Policy, Reform, and Privatisation (Romanian: Comisia pentru politică economică, reformă și privatizare); – Committee for Budget, Finance and Banks (Romanian: Comisia pentru buget, finanțe și bănci); – Committee for Industries and Services (Romanian: Comisia pentru industrii și servicii); – Committee for Transport and Infrastructure (Romanian: Comisia pentru transporturi și infrastructură); – Committee for Agriculture, Forestry, Food Industry and Specific Services (Romanian: Comisia pentru agricultură, silvicultură, industrie alimentară și servicii specifice); – Committee for Human Rights, Cults and National Minorities Issues (Romanian: Comisia pentru drepturile omului, culte și problemele minorităților naționale); – Committee for Public Administration and Territorial Planning (Romanian: Comisia pentru administrație publică și amenajarea teritoriului); – Committee for the Environment and Ecological Balance (Romanian: Comisia pentru mediu și echilibru ecologic); – Committee for Labour and Social Protection (Romanian: Comisia pentru muncă și protecţie socială); – Committee for Health and Family (Romanian: Comisia pentru sănătate și familie); – Committee for Teaching (Romanian: Comisia pentru învățământ); – Committee for Culture, Arts, Mass Information Means (Romanian: Comisia pentru cultură, arte, mijloace de informare în masă); – Committee for Legal Matters, Discipline and Immunities (Romanian: Comisia juridică, de disciplină și imunități); – Committee for Defence, Public Order and National Security (Romanian: Comisia pentru apărare, ordine publică și siguranță națională); – Committee for Foreign Policy (Romanian: Comisia pentru politică externă); – Committee for the Investigation of Abuses, Corrupt Practices and for Petitions (Romanian: Comisia pentru cercetarea abuzurilor, corupției și pentru petiții); – Committee for Standing Orders (Romanian: Comisia pentru regulament); – Committee for Information Technology and Communications (Romanian: Comisia pentru tehnologia informației și comunicațiilor); – Committee on Equal Opportunities for Women and Men (Romanian: Comisia pentru egalitatea de șanse pentru femei și bărbați); – Committee for the Romanian Communities from Outside the Borders of the Country (Romanian: Comisia pentru comunitățile de români din afara granițelor țării); – Committee for European Affairs (Romanian: Comisia pentru afaceri europene); – Committee for Constitutionality (Romanian: Comisia pentru constituționalitate); – Committee for Science and Technology (Romanian: Comisia pentru știință și tehnologie); – Committee for Youth and Sport (Romanian: Comisia pentru tineret și sport).

Elections
- Voting system: 1992–2008, since 2016: Closed list, D'Hondt method
- First election: 24–25 November 1864 19 November 1946 / 28 March 1948 20 May 1990
- Last election: 1 December 2024
- Next election: On or before 26 November 2028

Meeting place
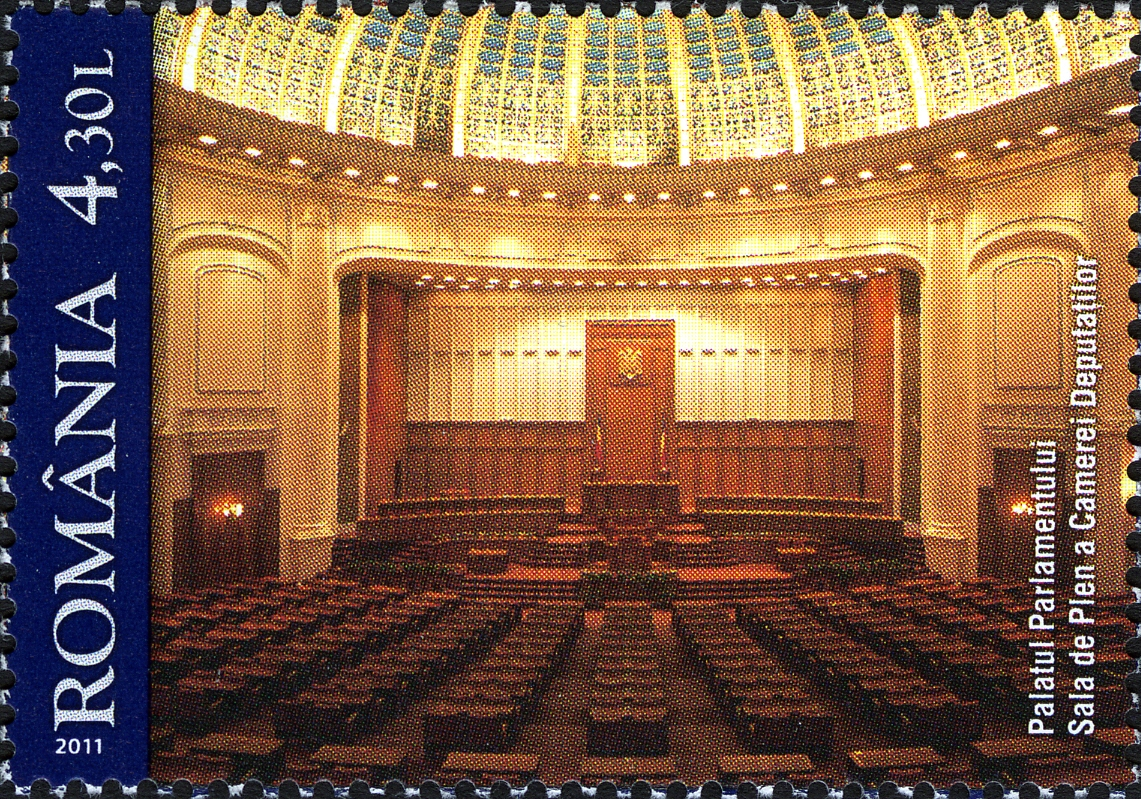
- Palace of the Parliament, Bucharest

Website
- cdep.ro

The Chamber of Deputies (Romanian: Camera Deputaților) is the lower house in Romania's bicameral parliament. It has 312 regular seats to which deputies are elected by direct popular vote using party-list proportional representation to serve four-year terms.

Additionally, the organisation of each national ethnic minority is entitled to a seat in the Chamber (under the limitation that a national minority is to be represented by one organisation only). As of the 2024 election, there are 19 such additional seats.

== Leadership and structure ==
=== Standing Bureau ===
The (Romanian: Biroul Permanent) is the body elected by the deputies that rules the Chamber. Its president is the President of the Chamber, who is elected for a whole legislature (usually four years). All the other members are elected at the beginning of each parliamentary session.

The Chamber of Deputies in Romania is chosen through a democratic process, where all citizens have an equal opportunity to vote freely and privately. It serves as a forum for the exchange of diverse viewpoints on national matters. Its primary responsibilities, as outlined in the Constitution, revolve around legislating, overseeing the actions of the executive branch, and bolstering parliamentary diplomacy alongside traditional diplomatic endeavors.

There is one president, and four each of vice presidents, quaestors, and secretaries. The current composition is listed below.

=== Last President of Chamber Election: September 2024 ===
Standing Bureau officers
Position	Name	Political group	Incumbent since
President	Ciprian-Constantin Șerban	PSD	23 December 2024
Vice-presidents	Petre-Florin Manole	PSD	2 September 2024
Vice-presidents	Ştefan-Ovidiu Popa	PSD	2 September 2024
Vice-presidents	Lucian Bode	PNL	February 2023
Vice-presidents	Oana Țoiu	USR	2 September 2024
Secretaries	Eliza-Mădălina Peţa-Ştefănescu	PSD	2 September 2024
Secretaries	Cristian Buican	PNL	21 December 2020
Secretaries	Gianina Şerban	AUR	February 2024
Secretaries	Ovidiu-Victor Ganț	Minorities (FDGR/DFDR)	21 December 2020
Quaestors	Mitică-Marius Mărgărit	PSD	September 2021
Quaestors	Alexandru Popa	PNL	2 September 2024
Quaestors	Rareş Tudor Pop	USR	2 September 2024
Quaestors	Dénes Seres	UDMR/RMDSZ	December 2020

=== Committees of the Chamber ===
Standing committees and current leadership are listed below.

Standing Bureau standing committees
Committee	President	Group	Incumbent since
Committee for Economic Policy, Reform, and Privatisation (Romanian: Comisia pentru politică economică, reformă și privatizare)	Costel Dunava	PSD	22 December 2020
Committee for Budget, Finance and Banks (Romanian: Comisia pentru buget, finanțe și bănci)	Bogdan Huțucă	PNL	22 December 2020
Committee for Industries and Services (Romanian: Comisia pentru industrii și servicii)	Sándor Bende	UDMR/RMDSZ	22 December 2020
Committee for Transport and Infrastructure (Romanian: Comisia pentru transporturi și infrastructură)	Ciprian Constantin Șerban	PSD	22 December 2020
Committee for Agriculture, Forestry, Food Industry and Specific Services (Romanian: Comisia pentru agricultură, silvicultură, industrie alimentară și servicii specifice)	Adrian Chesnoiu	PSD	22 December 2020
Committee for Human Rights, Cults and National Minorities Issues (Romanian: Comisia pentru drepturile omului, culte și problemele minorităților naționale)	Iusein Ibram	Minorities	22 December 2020
Committee for Public Administration and Territorial Planning (Romanian: Comisia pentru administrație publică și amenajarea teritoriului)	Simona Bucura-Oprescu	PSD	22 December 2020
Committee for the Environment and Ecological Balance (Romanian: Comisia pentru mediu și echilibru ecologic)	George Cătălin Stângă	PNL	22 December 2020
Committee for Labour and Social Protection (Romanian: Comisia pentru muncă și protecţie socială)	Oana Țoiu	USR	22 December 2020
Committee for Health and Family (Romanian: Comisia pentru sănătate și familie)	Nelu Tătaru	PNL	22 December 2020
Committee for Teaching (Romanian: Comisia pentru învățământ)	Natalia Intotero	PSD	22 December 2020
Committee for Culture, Arts, Mass Information Means (Romanian: Comisia pentru cultură, arte, mijloace de informare în masă)	Iulian Bulai	USR	22 December 2020
Committee for Legal Matters, Discipline and Immunities (Romanian: Comisia juridică, de disciplină și imunități)	Mihai Badea	USR	22 December 2020
Committee for Defence, Public Order and National Security (Romanian: Comisia pentru apărare, ordine publică și siguranță națională)	Constantin Șovăială	PNL	22 December 2020
Committee for Foreign Policy (Romanian: Comisia pentru politică externă)	Rozália Biró	UDMR/RMDSZ	22 December 2020
Committee for the Investigation of Abuses, Corrupt Practices and for Petitions (Romanian: Comisia pentru cercetarea abuzurilor, corupției și pentru petiții)	Steluța Cătăniciu	PSD	22 December 2020
Committee for Standing Orders (Romanian: Comisia pentru regulament)	Gheorghe Șimon	PSD	22 December 2020
Committee for Information Technology and Communications (Romanian: Comisia pentru tehnologia informației și comunicațiilor)	Ioan-Sabin Sărmaș	PNL	22 December 2020
Committee on Equal Opportunities for Women and Men (Romanian: Comisia pentru egalitatea de șanse pentru femei și bărbați)	Dan Tanasă	AUR	February 2021
Committee for the Romanian Communities from Outside the Borders of the Country (Romanian: Comisia pentru comunitățile de români din afara granițelor țării)	Gigel Știrbu	PNL	22 December 2020
Committee for European Affairs (Romanian: Comisia pentru afaceri europene)	Ștefan Mușoiu	PSD	22 December 2020
Committee for Constitutionality (Romanian: Comisia pentru constituționalitate)	Ringo Dămureanu	AUR	February 2021
Committee for Science and Technology (Romanian: Comisia pentru știință și tehnologie)	Dragoș Zisopol	Minorities	22 December 2020
Committee for Youth and Sport (Romanian: Comisia pentru tineret și sport)	Tudor Pop	USR	22 December 2020

== Party composition ==
=== 2024–2028 ===
The former political composition of the Romanian Parliament by political group breakdown (after 2024 election)

Seats in the Chamber of Deputies of Romania
Party	Election seating		Lost	Won	Present seating	
Party	Seats	%	Lost	Won	Seats	%
Social Democratic Party	86	26.06%	0	7	93	28.18%
Alliance for the Union of Romanians	64	19.39%	2	0	62	18.78%
National Liberal Party	49	14.84%	0	2	51	15.45%
Save Romania Union	40	12.12%	0	0	40	12.12%
S.O.S. Romania	27	8.18%	12	0	15	4.54%
Party of Young People	24	7.27%	10	0	5 (Note: Sitting as unaffiliated deputies)	1.51%
Democratic Union of Hungarians in Romania	22	6.66%	0	0	22	6.66%
Parties of ethnic minorities	18	5.45%	0	0	18	5.45%
Peace – Romania First	—	—	0	19	19 (Note: PEACE – Romania First did not exist at the time of the 2024 legislative elections. All deputies were elected on POT's and SOS RO's list. Also, some of the POT deputies have either left for other parties. There is an organizational conflict between the party leadership and the deputies who changed the name of the parliamentary group to United for Romania.)	5.75%
Independents	—	—	0	5	5	1.51%
Total	330	100	—		330	100

=== 2020–2024 ===
Seats in the Chamber of Deputies of Romania
Party	Election seating		Lost	Won	Present seating	
Party	Seats	%	Lost	Won	Seats	%
Social Democratic Party	110	33.33%	6	3	107	32.42%
National Liberal Party	93	28.18%	16	4	81	24.54%
Save Romania Union (Note: Initially entered the Parliament as USR PLUS, then reverted its name officially to USR after their latest party congress which took place in early October 2021.)	55	16.66%	13	0	42	12.72%
Alliance for the Union of Romanians	33	10.00%	11	1	23	6.96%
Democratic Union of Hungarians in Romania	21	6.36%	1	0	20	6.06%
Parties of ethnic minorities	18	5.45%	1	1	18	5.45%
Force of the Right	—	—	1	17	16	4.84%
Renewing Romania's European Project	—	—	0	9	9	2.72%
Social Liberal Humanist Party	—	—	0	4	4	1.21%
Romanian Nationhood Party	—	—	0	4	4	1.21%
The Right Alternative	—	—	0	3	3	0.90%
Alliance for the Homeland	—	—	0	1	1	0.30%
Association of Italians of Romania	—	—	0	1	1	0.30%
Independents	—	—	12	15	3	0.90%
Total	330	100	—		330	100

=== 2016–2020 ===
Seats in the Chamber of Deputies of Romania
Party	Election seating		Lost	Won	End seating	
Party	Seats	%	Lost	Won	Seats	%
Social Democratic Party	154	46.8%	65	28	117	35.56%
National Liberal Party	69	20.97%	6	3	66	20.06%
Save Romania Union	30	9.11%	11	6	25	7.59%
Democratic Union of Hungarians in Romania	21	6.38%	1	0	20	6.07%
Alliance of Liberals and Democrats	20	6.07%	10	4	14	4.26%
People's Movement Party	18	5.47%	9	6	15	4.55%
Parties of ethnic minorities	17	5.17%	0	0	17	5.17%
PRO Romania	—	—	0	21	21	6.38%
Humanist Power Party	—	—	0	7	7	2.12%
Independents	—	—	11	38	27	10.94%
Total	329	100	—		329	100

=== 2008–2012 ===
Seats in the Chamber of Deputies of Romania
Parliamentary Group	Election seating		Lost	Won	Present	
Parliamentary Group	Seats	%	Lost	Won	Seats	%
Democratic Liberal Party	115	34.43%	29	12	106	31.73%
Social Democratic Party	114	34.13%	29	2	91	27.24%
National Liberal Party	65	19.46%	21	6	56	16.76%
Democratic Union of Hungarians in Romania	22	6.58%	2	0	20	5.98%
Ethnic minorities parties	18	5.39%	2	0	16	4.79%
National Union for the Progress of Romania	—	—	16	16	12	3.59%
Independents					8	2.39%
Vacant seats					25	—
**Total**	**334**	**100**	—		**334**	**100**

=== 2004–2008 ===
In Romania's 2004 legislative election, held on 28 November, no party won an outright majority. The Social Democratic Party (PSD) won the largest number of seats but is currently in opposition because the Justice and Truth Alliance (DA), the Democratic Union of Hungarians in Romania (UDMR/RMDSZ), the Romanian Humanist Party (which later became the Conservative Party), and the National Minorities formed a governing coalition, giving it 177 seats in the Chamber of Deputies (47.9% of the total). The Conservative Party (PC) withdrew in December 2006, meaning that the government lost the majority in the Chamber of Deputies. In April 2007, then national liberal Prime Minister, Călin Popescu-Tăriceanu, dismissed the Democratic Party ministers from the government and formed a minority government with the Democratic Alliance of Hungarians in Romania, marking the end of the Justice and Truth Alliance.

During the 2004–2008 legislature, the president of the Chamber of Deputies was Bogdan Olteanu from the National Liberal Party (PNL), who was elected on 20 March 2006, after the Chamber's former president, Adrian Năstase, was forced by his own party (the Social Democratic Party, PSD) to step down amidst corruption allegations.

After the 2004 elections, several deputies from the PSD switched to other parties (including the governing Justice and Truth Alliance) or became independents, with the total number of PSD seats being reduced from 113 to 105. The number of Justice and Truth Alliance (DA) deputies also increased from 112 to 118, making it the largest formation in parliament as of October 2006. This changed again in December 2006, leaving the PSD with 107 seats and the Justice and Truth Alliance (DA) with 101. Since April 2007 the Justice and Truth Alliance (DA) has split leaving the two former members with 51 respectively 50 members. Deputies elected to the European Parliament in the 2007 election resigned, thus reducing the number of deputies to 314 as of 4 December 2007.

A new election was held in 2008. The table below gives the state of play before the 2008 election; parties in bold were part of the governing coalition. That coalition was tacitly supported by the PSD.

Seats in the Chamber of Deputies of Romania, 2004–2008
Party	% of seats	Seats
Social Democratic Party	32.31	105
Democratic Liberal Party	20.62	67
National Liberal Party	18.15	59
Greater Romania Party	6.77	22
Democratic Union of Hungarians in Romania	6.77	22
Conservative Party	5.85	19
Ethnic minority parties	5.54	18
Independents	4.00	13
**Total**	**100**	**325**

=== 2000–2004 ===
Elections to the Chamber of Deputies were held on 26 November 2000, in which the Social Democratic Party of Romania (PSD) won plurality. The governing majority was formed from the PSD and the Democratic Union of Hungarians in Romania (UDMR/RMDSZ), which, with 182 members, made up 54.8% of seats. The president of the Chamber of Deputies during this period was Valer Dorneanu, who was elected on 15 December 2000. The distribution of seats was as follows:

Seats in the Chamber of Deputies of Romania, 2000–2004
Party	% of seats	Seats
Social Democratic Party	44.93	155
Greater Romania Party	24.35	84
Democratic Party	8.99	31
National Liberal Party	8.70	30
Democratic Union of Hungarians in Romania	7.83	27
Ethnic minority parties	5.22	18
**Total**	**100**	**345**

== See also ==
- President of the Chamber of Deputies of Romania
