= 2020 Bucharest local elections =

2020 elections held in Bucharest

- 27 September 2020
- Turnout: 36.93%
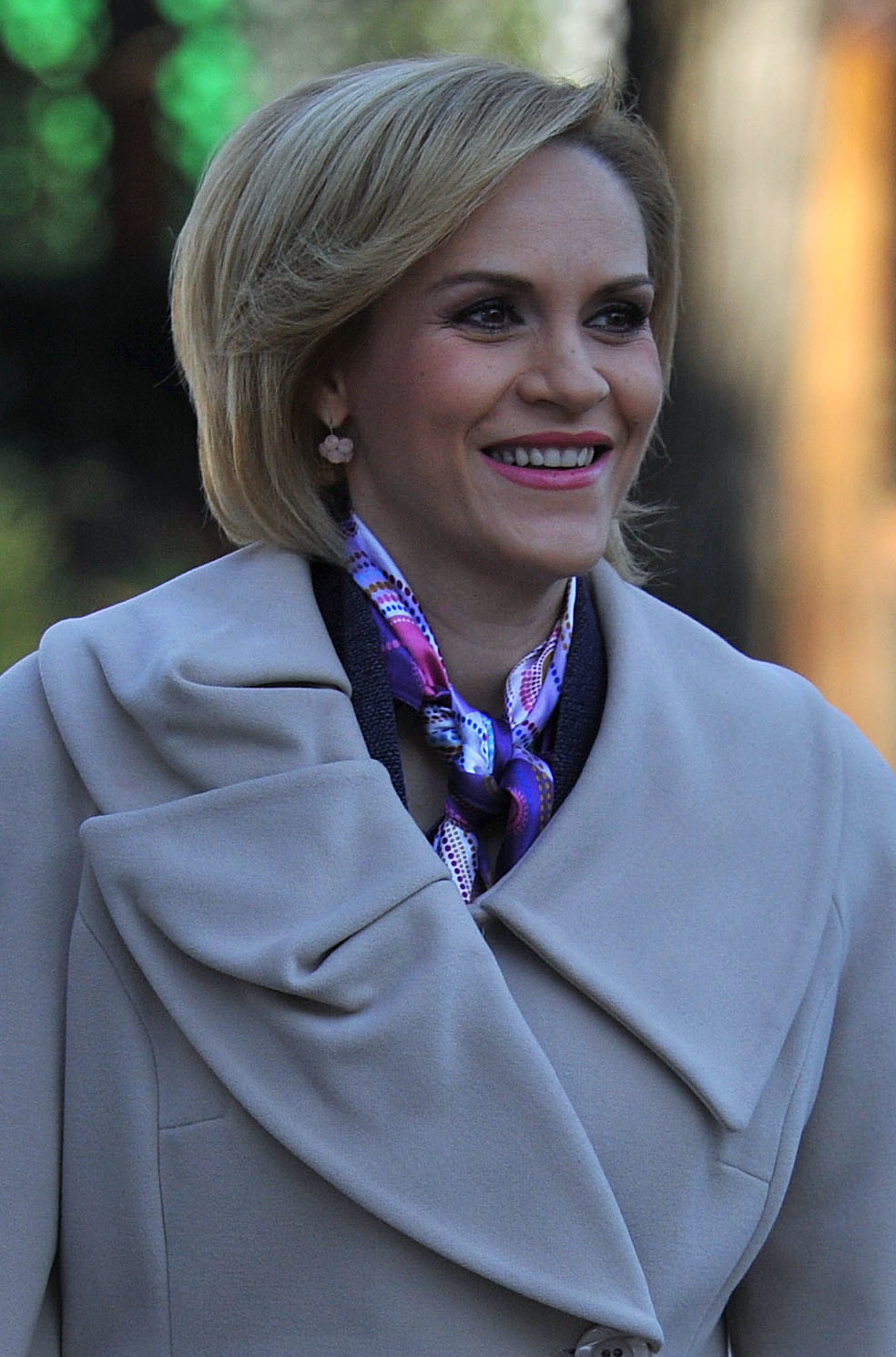

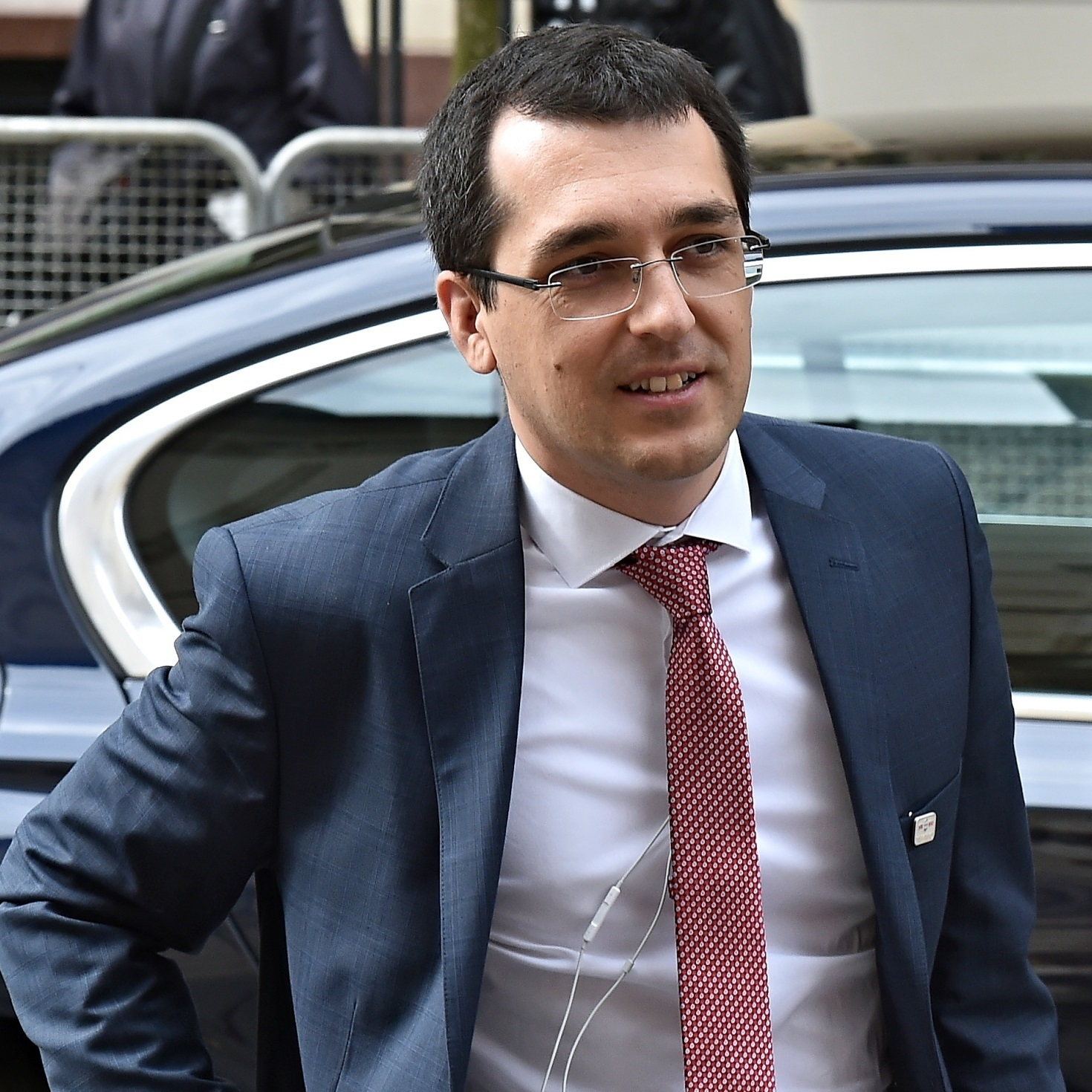

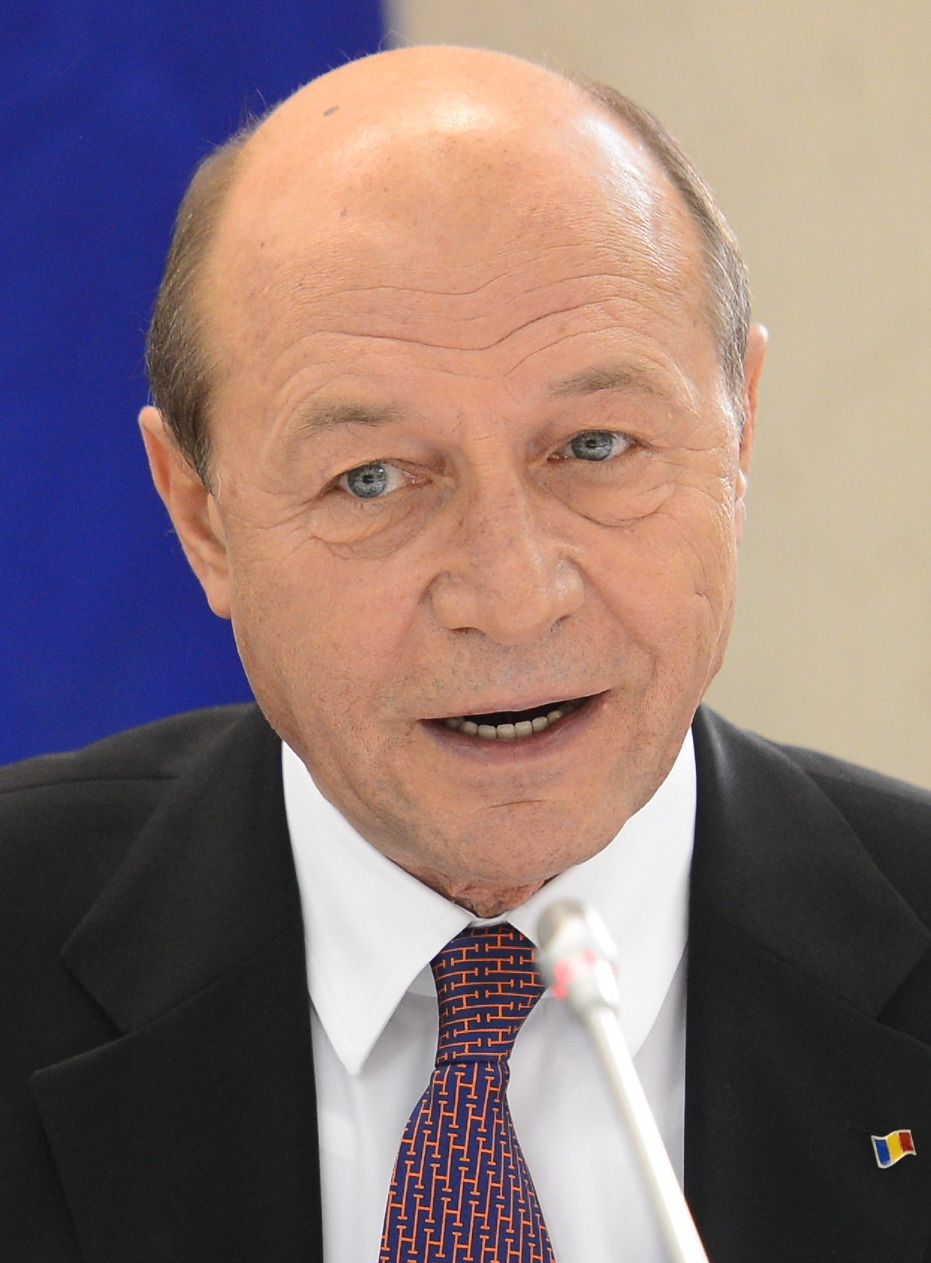
| | First party | Second party |
|---|---|---|
| Leader | Gabriela Firea | Vlad Voiculescu |
| Party | PSD | USR PLUS |
| Seats before | 24 | 15 |
| Seats won | 21 | 17 |
| Seat change | ▼3 | ▲2 |
| Popular vote | 211,164 | 175,953 |
| Percentage | 32.37% | 26.98% |
| | Third party | Fourth party |
| Leader | Violeta Alexandru | Traian Băsescu |
| Party | PNL | PMP |
| Seats before | 8 | 4 |
| Seats won | 12 | 5 |
| Seat change | ▲4 | ▲1 |
| Popular vote | 125,940 | 51,001 |
| Percentage | 19.31% | 7,82% |
Mayor before election
Gabriela Firea
PSD
Elected mayor
Nicușor Dan
Independent

The 2020 Bucharest local elections took place on 27 September. A total of 3,235 candidates participated for a variety of offices, including General Mayor and General Councilors of the Municipality of Bucharest, as well as mayors and local councilors for each of the city's 6 sectors.

== Municipal results ==
The General Mayor of the Municipality of Bucharest
| Party | Candidate | Votes | Votes % |
|---|---|---|---|
| Independent (supported by PNL and USR-PLUS) | Nicușor Dan | 282,631 | 42.82 |
| Social Democratic Party | Gabriela Firea | 250,690 | 37.98 |
| People's Movement Party | Traian Băsescu | 72,556 | 10.99 |
| Green Party | Florin Călinescu | 13,742 | 2.08 |
| Alliance of Liberals and Democrats | Călin Popescu-Tăriceanu | 9,892 | 1.50 |
| Pro Bucharest 2020 | Ioan Sîrbu | 5,315 | 0.81 |
| Alliance for the Union of Romanians | Claudiu Târziu | 4,445 | 0.67 |
| Greater Romania Party | Ileana Nănău | 3,270 | 0.50 |
| Ecologist Party of Romania | Valentina Bistriceanu | 3,138 | 0.48 |
| Others | | 14,439 | 2.19 |
| Total | | 660,118 | 100 |

General Council of the Municipality of Bucharest
| Party | Votes | Votes % | Seats | Change |
|---|---|---|---|---|
| Social Democratic Party | 211,164 | 32.38 | 21 | ▼3 |
| USR-PLUS Alliance | 175,953 | 26.98 | 17 | ▲2 |
| National Liberal Party | 125,940 | 19.31 | 12 | ▲4 |
| People's Movement Party | 51,001 | 7.82 | 5 | ▲1 |
| Alliance of Liberals and Democrats | 19,088 | 2.93 | 0 | ▼4 |
| Others | 69,009 | 10.58 | 0 | Steady |
| Total | 652,155 | 100 | 55 | N/A |

== Local councils results ==
=== Sector 1 ===
Sector Mayor
| Party | Candidate | Votes | Votes % |
|---|---|---|---|
| USR-PLUS Alliance | Clotilde Armand | 36,455 | 40.95 |
| Social Democratic Party | Daniel Tudorache | 35,451 | 39.82 |
| People's Movement Party | Ioana Constantin | 6,929 | 7.78 |
| Independent | Daniel Bucura | 1,939 | 2.18 |
| Pro Bucharest 2020 | Adina Alberts | 1,859 | 2.09 |
| Alliance of Liberals and Democrats | Amalia Nenovici | 1,328 | 1.49 |
| Green Party | Crina Mechno | 1,057 | 1.19 |
| Ecologist Party of Romania | Adriana Bahmuțeanu | 1,028 | 1.15 |
| Alliance for the Union of Romanians | Andrei Dîrlău | 607 | 0.68 |
| Greater Romania Party | Remus Mamoc | 542 | 0.61 |
| Others | | 1,837 | 2.06 |
| Total | | 89,032 | 100 |

Local Council
| Party | Votes | Votes % | Seats | Change |
|---|---|---|---|---|
| Social Democratic Party | 27,648 | 31.07 | 9 | Steady |
| USR-PLUS Alliance | 26,675 | 29.98 | 9 | ▲1 |
| National Liberal Party | 16,856 | 18.94 | 6 | Steady |
| People's Movement Party | 7,797 | 8.76 | 3 | ▲1 |
| Alliance of Liberals and Democrats | 1,333 | 1.50 | 0 | ▼2 |
| Others | 8,670 | 9.75 | 0 | Steady |
| Total | 88,979 | 100 | 27 | N/A |

=== Sector 2 ===
Sector Mayor
| Party | Candidate | Votes | Votes % |
|---|---|---|---|
| USR-PLUS Alliance | Radu Mihaiu | 42,094 | 36.63 |
| Social Democratic Party | Dan Cristian Popescu | 35,920 | 31.25 |
| Social Liberal Humanist Party | Neculai Onțanu | 16,035 | 13.95 |
| People's Movement Party | Cătălin Militaru | 6,768 | 5.89 |
| Pro Bucharest 2020 | Florin Manea | 2,988 | 2.60 |
| Alliance of Liberals and Democrats | Ramona Mezei | 2,903 | 2.53 |
| Alliance for the Union of Romanians | Ana-Maria Mihai | 1,710 | 1.49 |
| Ecologist Party of Romania | Constantin Ureche | 1,526 | 1.33 |
| Greater Romania Party | Petre Spîrleanu | 872 | 0.76 |
| Others | | 4,109 | 3.57 |
| Total | | 114,925 | 100 |

Local Council
| Party | Votes | Votes % | Seats | Change |
|---|---|---|---|---|
| Social Democratic Party | 35,622 | 31.31 | 10 | Steady |
| USR-PLUS Alliance | 33,145 | 29.14 | 9 | ▲4 |
| National Liberal Party | 21,583 | 18.97 | 6 | Steady |
| People's Movement Party | 7,033 | 6.18 | 2 | Steady |
| Alliance of Liberals and Democrats | 2,631 | 2.31 | 0 | ▼2 |
| Ecologist Party of Romania | 1,454 | 1.28 | 0 | ▼2 |
| Others | 12,301 | 10.81 | 0 | Steady |
| Total | 113,769 | 100 | 27 | N/A |

=== Sector 3 ===
Sector Mayor
| Party | Candidate | Votes | Votes % |
|---|---|---|---|
| Pro Bucharest 2020 | Robert Negoiță | 58,786 | 43.74 |
| National Liberal Party | Adrian Moraru | 38,279 | 28.48 |
| Social Democratic Party | Aurelian Bădulescu | 18,427 | 13.71 |
| People's Movement Party | Mihail Neamțu | 9,593 | 7.14 |
| Alliance of Liberals and Democrats | Bogdan Brătianu | 2,297 | 1.71 |
| Ecologist Party of Romania | Andrei Pleșea | 2,237 | 1.67 |
| Alliance for the Union of Romanians | Ștefan Dima | 1,287 | 0.96 |
| Greater Romania Party | Corneliu Ștefan | 877 | 0.65 |
| Others | | 2,611 | 1.94 |
| Total | | 134,394 | 100 |

Local Council
| Party | Votes | Votes % | Seats | Change |
|---|---|---|---|---|
| USR-PLUS Alliance | 34,236 | 25.70 | 9 | ▲1 |
| Social Democratic Party | 29,940 | 22.48 | 8 | ▼7 |
| National Liberal Party | 26,405 | 19.82 | 7 | ▲3 |
| Pro Bucharest 2020 | 20,230 | 15.19 | 5 | New |
| People's Movement Party | 10,173 | 7.64 | 2 | Steady |
| Alliance of Liberals and Democrats | 3,733 | 2.80 | 0 | ▼2 |
| Others | 8,487 | 6.37 | 0 | Steady |
| Total | 133,204 | 100 | 31 | N/A |

=== Sector 4 ===
Sector Mayor
| Party | Candidate | Votes | Votes % |
|---|---|---|---|
| Social Democratic Party | Daniel Băluță | 58,577 | 57.03 |
| USR-PLUS Alliance | Simona Spătaru | 30,688 | 29.88 |
| People's Movement Party | Ștefănel Marin | 4,507 | 4.39 |
| Ecologist Party of Romania | Ovidiu Zară | 2,696 | 2.62 |
| Alliance of Liberals and Democrats | Adrian Chiotan | 1,501 | 1.46 |
| Independent | Constantin Filip | 1,439 | 1.40 |
| Pro Bucharest 2020 | Gabriel Ispas | 1,189 | 1.16 |
| Independent Social Democratic Party | Vasile Negrilă | 1,108 | 1.08 |
| Greater Romania Party | Simion Călina | 1,005 | 0.98 |
| Total | | 102,710 | 100 |

Local Council
| Party | Votes | Votes % | Seats | Change |
|---|---|---|---|---|
| PSD-PPUSL | 37,756 | 37.16 | 11 | ▼2 |
| USR-PLUS Alliance | 28,999 | 28.54 | 9 | ▲3 |
| National Liberal Party | 16,226 | 15.97 | 5 | Steady |
| People's Movement Party | 6,688 | 6.58 | 2 | Steady |
| Alliance of Liberals and Democrats | 2,714 | 2.67 | 0 | ▼1 |
| Others | 9,223 | 9.08 | 0 | Steady |
| Total | 101,606 | 100 | 27 | N/A |

=== Sector 5 ===
Sector Mayor
| Party | Candidate | Votes | Votes % |
|---|---|---|---|
| Social Liberal Humanist Party | Cristian Popescu Piedone | 25,902 | 28.08 |
| Social Democratic Party | Daniel Florea | 23,649 | 25.64 |
| National Liberal Party | Cristian Băcanu | 23,282 | 25.24 |
| Independent Social Democratic Party | Marian Vanghelie | 11,237 | 12.18 |
| People's Movement Party | Cătălin Iliescu | 3,540 | 3.84 |
| Alliance of Liberals and Democrats | Ion Voicu | 1,765 | 1.91 |
| Pro Bucharest 2020 | Ștefan Pirpiliu | 1,313 | 1.42 |
| Greater Romania Party | Adrian Urichianu | 568 | 0.62 |
| Others | | 981 | 1.07 |
| Total | | 92,237 | 100 |

Local council
| Party | Votes | Votes % | Seats | Change |
|---|---|---|---|---|
| Social Democratic Party | 28,181 | 31.30 | 10 | ▼2 |
| National Liberal Party | 18,444 | 20.48 | 6 | Steady |
| USR-PLUS Alliance | 14,838 | 16.48 | 5 | Steady |
| Social Liberal Humanist Party | 10,772 | 11.96 | 4 | New |
| People's Movement Party | 6,138 | 6.82 | 2 | New |
| Others | 11,674 | 12.96 | 0 | Steady |
| Total | 90,047 | 100 | 27 | N/A |

=== Sector 6 ===
Sector Mayor
| Party | Candidate | Votes | Votes % |
|---|---|---|---|
| National Liberal Party | Ciprian Ciucu | 54,134 | 43.40 |
| Social Democratic Party | Gabriel Mutu | 43,105 | 34.56 |
| People's Movement Party | Ștefan Florescu | 9,575 | 7.68 |
| Independent | Mihai Daneș | 4,736 | 3.80 |
| Alliance of Liberals and Democrats | Tudor Ionescu | 4,545 | 3.64 |
| Pro Bucharest 2020 | Anca Bălășoiu | 2,482 | 1.99 |
| Ecologist Party of Romania | Călin Tudose | 1,799 | 1.44 |
| Alliance for the Union of Romanians | Viorica Lupu | 1,116 | 0.89 |
| Greater Romania Party | Daniel Tulugea | 1,012 | 0.81 |
| Others | | 2,229 | 1.79 |
| Total | | 124,733 | 100 |

Local council
| Party | Votes | Votes % | Seats | Change |
|---|---|---|---|---|
| Social Democratic Party | 36,448 | 29.43 | 9 | ▼2 |
| National Liberal Party | 32,964 | 26.61 | 8 | ▲4 |
| USR-PLUS Alliance | 30,657 | 24.75 | 8 | ▲1 |
| People's Movement Party | 9,525 | 7.69 | 2 | ▼1 |
| Alliance of Liberals and Democrats | 3,752 | 3.03 | 0 | ▼2 |
| Others | 10,521 | 8.49 | 0 | Steady |
| Total | 123,867 | 100 | 27 | N/A |
