= Băsescu (surname) =

Băsescu is a Romanian surname. Notable people with the surname include:

- Traian Băsescu (born 1951), Romanian politician
- Maria Băsescu (born 1951), wife of Traian
- Elena Băsescu (born 1980), Romanian politician, daughter of Traian and Maria
