= Clotilde Armand =

Romanian politician (born 1973)

Clotilde Marie Brigitte Armand
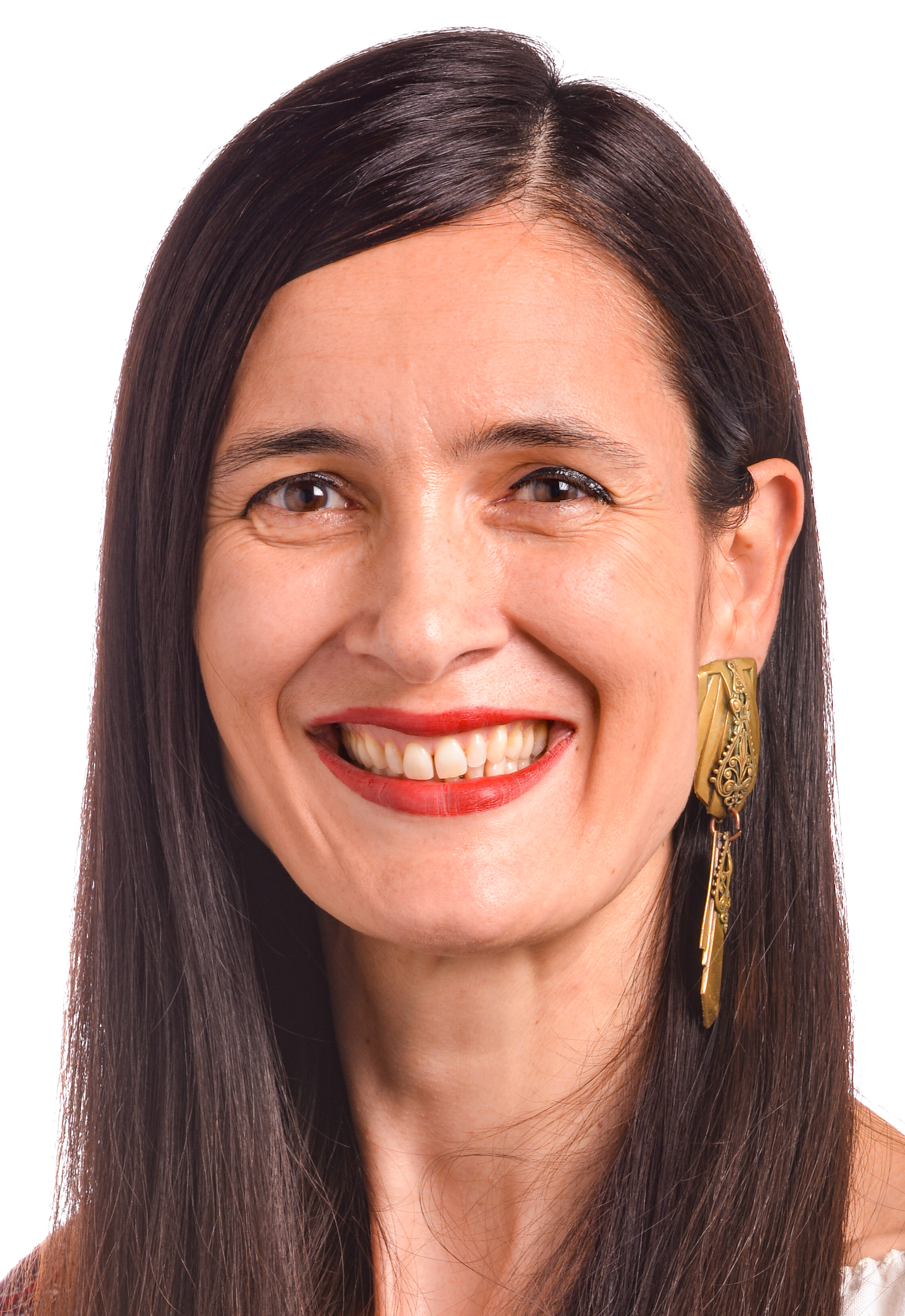

Member of the European Parliament for Romania
- In office 2 July 2019 – 27 October 2020

Mayor of Sector 1
- In office 27 October 2020 – 4 November 2024
- Preceded by: Daniel Tudorache
- Succeeded by: George Tuță

Personal details
- Born: Clotilde Armand; 28 June 1973 (age 53) Pointe-à-Pitre, Guadeloupe, France
- Party: Save Romania Union (USR)
- Spouse: Sergiu Moroianu
- Children: 4
- Education: École Centrale Paris; Massachusetts Institute of Technology

Clotilde Marie Brigitte Armand (born 28 June 1973) is a French-born Romanian politician and businesswoman. Between October 2020 and November 2024, she was Mayor of Bucharest's Sector 1.

Armand first ran for Mayor of Sector 1 in the 2016 Romanian local elections on behalf of Save Bucharest Union (USB), a local party she had co-founded in 2015, eventually losing narrowly after having been announced as winner by the exit polls. From July 2019 until November 2020 she was a Member of the European Parliament.

== Early life and education ==
Clotilde Marie Brigitte Armand was born in Pointe-à-Pitre, France, where her father was undergoing alternative military service as a mathematics teacher. Her family was from Vichy, where she also attended primary and secondary school. She studied at the École Centrale Paris and then the Massachusetts Institute of Technology, where she met her future husband, Sergiu Moroianu, a Romanian mathematician. She married Moroianu in 1997 and moved to Bucharest in 1999. In the following years, she lived some years in France and Germany, before settling in Bucharest again in 2003.

== Career ==
In 2002, Armand worked for Airbus in France and Germany, managing part of the A380 project management team. In 2005, she became IT Director of Distrigaz Sud, the Romanian branch of gas distribution giant GDF Suez, later moving to Paris as Innovation Director for GDF Suez Europe. Between September 2013 and March 2017, Armand was the head of the Romanian and Bulgarian branches of French engineering company Egis.

She acquired Romanian citizenship in 2015.

== Political career ==
=== 2016 local elections ===
Nicușor Dan, a political activist and friend of Armand's husband, founded a new party called Save Bucharest Union. Armand was chosen by the party to be their mayoral candidate for Bucharest's Sector 1 and began organizing her campaign only six weeks before the deadline. Her campaign was based on anti-corruption and against politics as usual, arguing that "the political class has been separated from the true will of the people".

She promised better management of public services, following the urban design model of Paris (replacing the car-centered model with a public transport model) and building an esplanade surrounding the lakes in the northern part of the sector.

Although exit polls and early results indicated she was the winner, the final results showed that she lost to Social Democratic Party's Daniel Tudorache, who received 23,220 votes (31,07%), while Armand received only 21,504 votes (28,77%).

=== Member of the European Parliament, 2019–2020 ===
In the 2019 European elections, Armand was fourth on the USR-PLUS list (first woman) and she won an MP seat. Armand was one of only two women among the eight MP elected on the USR-PLUS list. She served on the Committee on Budgets.

Armand contended that most of the money in Europe flows from East to West, not the other way around and that since Western European companies have been making big money from EU-funded public procurements in Eastern Europe, it would be fair if structural funds were increased. She argued that between 2010-2016, Hungary, Poland, Czech Republic, or Slovakia received the equivalent of 2 percent to 4 percent of their GDP in EU funds, but the flow of capital exiting these countries over the same period was between 4-8 percent of GDP. She called for a fair distribution of resources in the EU budget to compensate for brain-drain effects, like the 10 percent of Romanian doctors leaving the country every year to heal patients in the West. In an opinion article in Financial Times, Armand argued that The west made profits; the east made progress. The deal was mutually beneficial. But if the west starts reneging on those promises now, they risk tearing up the European social contract.

Armand was part of the MEPs Against Cancer group.

=== Mayor of Bucharest Sector 1, 2020–2024 ===
Armand was elected mayor of Sector 1 in September 2020 against Daniel Tudorache (PSD), and gave up her seat in the European Parliament. Her term was marked by the fierce disputes with the local council controlled by the coalition PSD-PNL, as Armand claimed she was trying to keep in check the costs of the waste management company Romprest. Armand publicly claimed that some of Romprest's unitary tariffs were 14 times higher than those of similar size cities elsewhere in Romania. The sanitation contract between Romprest and the City Hall of Sector 1 was signed in 2008, for a period of 25 years during the term of the former mayor Adrian Chiliman (2004–2015). Between 2016–2020, Sector 1 was led by Daniel Tudorache, previously Deputy Mayor between 2008–2011.

During Armand's term, constant fights between her and the PSD–PNL majority in the Local Council resulted in around 1 Billion lei (200M euro) being left unspent, more than all the other Bucharest sectors combined.

=== 2024 local elections ===
In the June 2024 local elections, the government changed the electoral law on March 8, 2024 to hold early local elections on June 9, although the mayor mandates were valid until the end of October. In this context, Armand lost the elections for Bucharest Sector 1 to George Tuță (PSD–PNL), former assistant to the director of spy agency SRI. Armand claimed that the elections in Sectors 1 and 2 were rigged by the government coalition and by the Central Electoral Bureau led by Toni Greblă, a former PSD member.

== Political positions ==
Armand argues that Romania needs a change of the political class. She wrote an open letter to President Klaus Iohannis in which she asked the two main parties of Romania (the Social Democratic Party and the National Liberal Party, both of which have roots in the National Salvation Front) to apologize for their involvement in the June 1990 Mineriad and to remove former president Ion Iliescu and former Prime Minister Petre Roman from public life.

Armand says she does not believe in the left–right politics paradigm, arguing that, in Romania, the money wasted due to corruption is far higher than the differences between standard left and right policies. Nevertheless, she considers herself, within the French political context, a person that is naturally right-wing, but that Romania currently has many people who need the help of the state and that these people, who did not adapt to the changes and are no longer useful to society, should be re-integrated.

== Electoral history ==
=== Mayor of Sector 1 ===
Election	Affiliation	Main round		
Election	Affiliation	Votes	Percentage	Position
2016	USB	21,504	28.77%	2nd
2020	USR PLUS (additionally supported by PNL)	36,455	40.95%	1st
2024	ADU	35,237	35.92%	2nd
