= Gabriela Firea =

Romanian journalist and politician

Gabriela Firea MEP
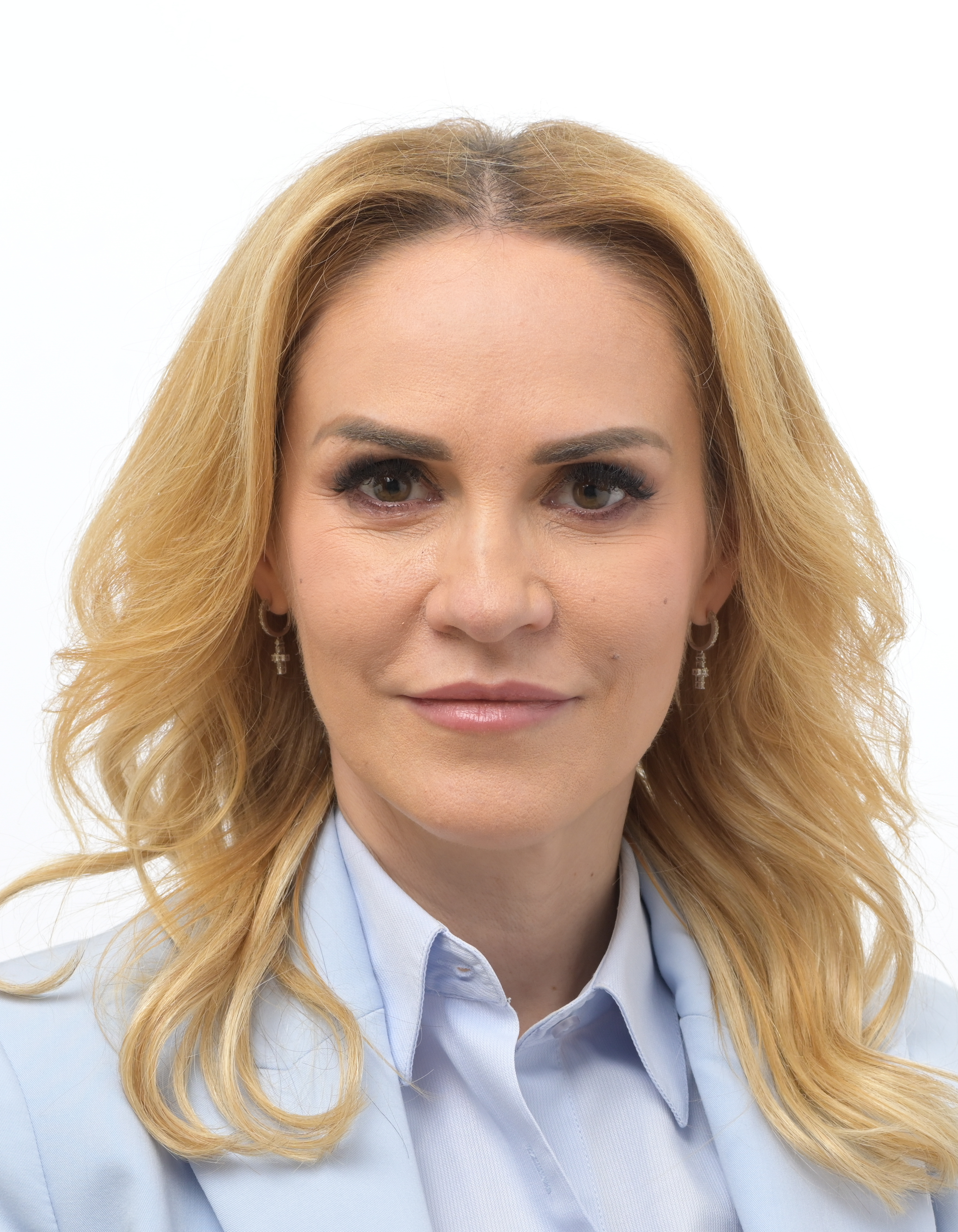
- Official portrait, 2024

Minister of Family, Youth and Equality of Opportunity
- In office 25 November 2021 – 14 July 2023
- Prime Minister: Nicolae Ciucă; Marcel Ciolacu
- Preceded by: Office established
- Succeeded by: Natalia-Elena Intotero

General Mayor of Bucharest
- In office 23 June 2016 – 29 October 2020
- Preceded by: Răzvan Sava (Acting)
- Succeeded by: Nicușor Dan

Member of the Senate of Romania
- In office 21 December 2020 – 15 July 2024
- Constituency: Bucharest
- In office 19 December 2012 – 22 June 2016
- Constituency: Ilfov County

Government Press secretary
- In office 5 January 2000 – 28 December 2000
- Prime Minister: Mugur Isărescu

Member of the European Parliament for Romania
- Incumbent
- Assumed office 16 July 2024

Personal details
- Born: 13 July 1972 (age 54) Bacău, Bacău County, Socialist Republic of Romania
- Party: Social Democratic Party (2012–present)
- Spouse(s): Răsvan Firea (m. 1993; died 2010) Florentin Pandele (m. 2011)
- Children: 3
- Education: University of Bucharest; Bucharest Academy of Economic Studies
- Occupation: Journalist, writer, politician
- Profession: Philologist, economist

Gabriela Firea (born Gabriela Vrânceanu, 13 July 1972) is a Romanian journalist and politician who served as mayor of Bucharest, the capital of Romania, between 2016 and 2020, first female elected. Since 2024 she is a member of the European Parliament in S&D, the political group of socialists and democrats.

== Biography ==
Gabriela Firea was born on 13 July 1972 in Bacău, Bacău County, being the second of the four children of the Vrânceanu family. The mother, Veronica, was a saleswoman and the father an unskilled worker on a construction site. She has two sisters, Nela and Angelica, and a brother, Ionel.

She has worked in radio, newspapers, and television, including as a news presenter. A member of the Social Democratic Party (PSD), she was elected to the Romanian Senate in 2012 for an Ilfov County seat. She sat on the Senate's culture committee.

She attended the primary school General School no. 8 from the Letea neighborhood in Bacău, and graduated from the Industrial High School no. 1 Bacău and the Faculty of Letters of the University of Bucharest, specialization Communication Sciences. She continued with postgraduate and academic training at the Academy of Economic Studies (ASE), specialising in 'International currency and fiscal mechanisms, Banking and stock exchange management', as well as a brokerage course. In 2010, she became a PhD student in economics at the Academy of Economic Studies in Bucharest. Subsequently, she froze her doctoral training program, to dedicate herself to the position of Mayor.

She married Răsvan Firea in 1993 and the couple had one son. One year after Răsvan's death in 2010, she married Florentin Pandele, the mayor of Voluntari. They have two sons.

=== Professional career ===
She has started her career in the press in 1990, being a reporter for the weekly "Simply" in Bacău, and then for the daily Azi in Bucharest, in 1991–1992. In 1992–1993 she was editor-presenter at Radio Contact. Between 1993 and 1999 she worked at the Romanian Television as a producer of economic reports, especially financial-banking, editor-presenter of the show "Jurnal", director-moderator of the show "Special Edition" and Producer-moderator of the column "News of the Day".

Since 2001 she has worked for the Intact press trust. She was the editor and presenter of the show "Observator" (until July 2009), as well as the director of the show "Financial Week" on Antena 1 and the show "Știrea Zilei" on Antena 3. Since September 2008 she has held the position of general manager of Financial Week magazine, after having previously been the editorial director of the publication since its inception in March 2005. Since June 2009, she has taken over the management of Intact Advertising, an event and advertising agency. She is also the general manager of the newspaper Financiarul and of the magazine Felicia.

Since November 2011, when the Intact Trust reorganized its activity and the business magazines stopped appearing in printed format, Firea ended her activity in the publishing area.

=== Literary and musical activity ===
Firea has been a member of the Writers Union since 2002. She received the debut award from the Bucharest Writers Association in 2001, for the volume of poems "Another World". Her books include the novel "Three Reasons", the children's book "Twisted and Spinning Country", the volume of economic essays "Word Economy" and the volume of socio-economic essays "The Diary of an Observer".

In December 2009, together with Simona Gherghe, she released the folk music album Trandafiri de la Moldova.

== Political career ==
She initially began her political career in 1999 but, after a short time, gave it up and returned to the press.

A member of the Social Democratic Party (PSD) since August 2012, she ran for a seat in the Senate, in College 1 – Ilfov, in the elections of 9 November 2012, being elected by 74.65% of those who voted. She was a member of the Senate Committee on Culture and Media, vice-chairman of the Joint Committee of the Chamber of Deputies and the Senate for the relationship with UNESCO and spokesperson for the group of PSD senators.

On 24 February 2013, she was elected president of the Ilfov County organization of PSD, and at the Congress of 20 April 2013 she was elected vice president of the party at the national level, being proposed by the Social Democratic Women's Organization.

Since 2014, she has been appointed party spokesperson, and in the presidential elections of 2–16 November 2014, she served as PSD spokesperson Victor Ponta.

On 10 February 2016, she was appointed by the PSD National Executive Committee to coordinate the Bucharest branch, as interim president, to prepare for the local elections. On 18 March 2016, she was appointed to run for mayor of Bucharest, a position she won following the 5 June 2016 elections. As a result, given her position, in 2016, she did not run for the legislative elections.

At the June 2016 local election, Firea was elected the first female mayor of Bucharest. She won 43% from the total of only 33% citizens of Bucharest who went to vote at that time. Her closest political contenders, more specifically Nicușor Dan (Save Bucharest Union) and Cătălin Predoiu (National Liberal Party), gained only 30.5% and 11.2% respectively. Subsequently, she lost the position of mayor of Bucharest at the 2020 local elections, in which she finished second behind incumbent Bucharest mayor Nicușor Dan (then an independent candidate supported by the 2020 USR-PLUS Alliance and the National Liberal Party).

== Electoral history ==
=== Mayor of Bucharest ===
Election	Affiliation	First round		
Election	Affiliation	Votes	Percentage	Position
2016	PSD (supported by UNPR)	246,553	42.97%	1st
2020	PSD (supported by PPU)	250,690	37.97%	2nd
2024	PSD	163,147	22.34%	2nd
