= First Lady of Romania =

Wife of the president of Romania

Partner of Nicusor Dan
- Prima Doamnă a României
- Incumbent; Mirabela Grădinaru since 26 May 2025
- Style: Ms.
- Residence: (none)
- Inaugural holder: Elena Ceaușescu
- Formation: 28 March 1974; 52 years ago

First Lady of Romania (Romanian: Prima Doamnă a României) is an honorific applied to the wife of the president of Romania, concurrent with his term of office.

== List of first ladies ==
Image	Name	Term	President
	Elena Ceaușescu	28 March 1974 – 22 December 1989	Nicolae Ceaușescu
	Nina Iliescu	22 December 1989 – 29 November 1996	Ion Iliescu
	Nadia Ileana Bogorin	29 November 1996 – 20 December 2000	Emil Constantinescu
	Nina Iliescu	20 December 2000 – 20 December 2004	Ion Iliescu
	Maria Băsescu	20 December 2004 – 20 April 2007	Traian Băsescu
	Marilena Văcăroiu	20 April 2007 – 23 May 2007 (interim)	Nicolae Văcăroiu
	Maria Băsescu	23 May 2007 – 23 July 2012	Traian Băsescu
	Adina Ioana Vălean	23 July 2012 – 27 August 2012 (interim)	Crin Antonescu
	Maria Băsescu	27 August 2012 – 21 December 2014	Traian Băsescu
	Carmen Iohannis	21 December 2014 – 12 February 2025	Klaus Iohannis
Vacant (12 February 2025 – 26 May 2025) Ilie Bolojan divorced			Ilie Bolojan
	Mirabela Grădinaru	26 May 2025 – present	Nicușor Dan
