= Mirabela Grădinaru =

First Lady of Romania since 2025

- Grădinaru in 2026

First Lady of Romania
- Acting (Note: As domestic partner)
- In role 26 May 2025
- President: Nicușor Dan
- Preceded by: Carmen Iohannis

Personal details
- Born: Vaslui, Vaslui County, Socialist Republic of Romania
- Education: University of Bucharest
- Occupation: Manager

Mirabela Grădinaru is the domestic partner of Nicușor Dan, president of Romania since the 2025 Romanian presidential election. She is a manager for the Romanian branch of Renault. and originally from Vaslui.
