= Nadia Ileana Bogorin =

Romanian First Lady

Nadia Ileana Constantinescu (Bogorin)

First Lady of Romania
- In role 29 November 1996 – 20 December 2000
- President: Emil Constantinescu
- Preceded by: Nina Iliescu
- Succeeded by: Nina Iliescu

Personal details
- Born: 18 June 1940 (age 86) Sibiu
- Spouse: Emil Constantinescu
- Children: Dragoș; Norina Boru
- Education: Faculty of Law - University of Bucharest
- Profession: Lawyer

Nadia Ileana Bogorin (Constantinescu) (born 18 June 1940) is the wife of the 3rd President of Romania Emil Constantinescu. She was the First Lady of Romania from 29 November 1996 to 20 December 2000.
