= Carmen Iohannis =

First Lady of Romania from 2014 to 2025

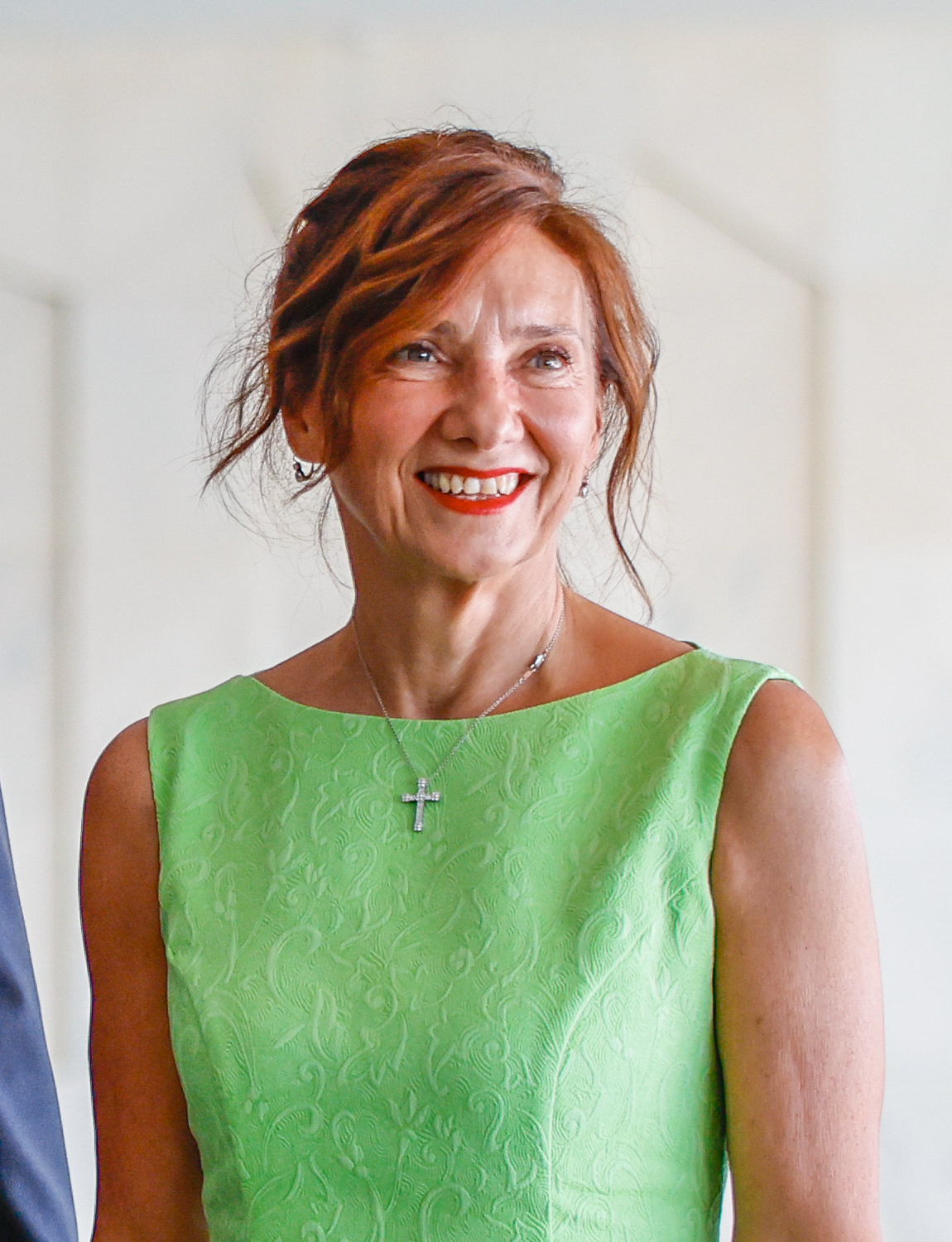
- Iohannis in 2023

First Lady of Romania
- In role 21 December 2014 – 12 February 2025
- President: Klaus Iohannis
- Preceded by: Maria Băsescu
- Succeeded by: Mirabela Grădinaru

Personal details
- Born: Carmen Georgeta Lăzurcă; 2 November 1960 (age 65) Sibiu, Romanian People's Republic
- Spouse: Klaus Iohannis (m. 1989)
- Occupation: English teacher at Gheorghe Lazăr National College, Sibiu

Carmen Georgeta Iohannis (Note: Romanian: [ˈkarmen dʒe̯orˈdʒeta joˈhanis]; also Germanized as Carmen Johannis [ˈkaʁmən joˈhanɪs].) (née Lăzurcă; born 2 November 1960) is a Romanian teacher who served as First Lady of Romania from 2014 to 2025 as the wife of Klaus Iohannis.

== Biography ==
Carmen is the descendant of a Romanian Greek-Catholic family from Sântu, a village near Reghin, in the neighbouring Mureș County. During the prohibition of the Romanian Greek Catholic Church by the communist authorities, Carmen attended surreptitious services officiated by Archpriest Pompeiu Onofreiu at his home in Șelarilor Street, services which were also attended by Klaus Iohannis.

Carmen and Klaus met while they were both students at the Babeș-Bolyai University in Cluj-Napoca. Immediately after graduation, the two were assigned as teachers to Agnita and Sibiu. She was the reason Iohannis chose to stay in Romania when the rest of his family emigrated to Germany in the early 1990's. She is an ethnic Romanian, while her husband is an ethnic German of Transylvanian Saxon descent. They married in 1989.

Carmen is an English teacher at the Gheorghe Lazăr National College in Sibiu.

== Honours ==
=== Foreign honours ===
- Italy: Knight Grand Cross of the Order of Merit of the Italian Republic (5 October 2018)

== Notes ==
Honorary titles
Preceded by Maria Băsescu	First Lady of Romania; 2014–2025	Succeeded by Mirabela Grădinaru
