= Nina Iliescu =

First Lady of Romania, 1989–1996 and 2000-2004

First Lady of Romania
- In role 20 December 2000 – 20 December 2004
- President: Ion Iliescu
- Preceded by: Nadia Ileana Bogorin
- Succeeded by: Maria Băsescu
- In role 22 December 1989 – 29 November 1996; Acting to 20 May 1990
- President: Ion Iliescu
- Preceded by: Elena Ceaușescu
- Succeeded by: Nadia Ileana Bogorin

Personal details
- Born: 4 March 1930 (age 96) Bucharest, Kingdom of Romania
- Spouse: Ion Iliescu (m. 1951; died 2025)

Elena 'Nina' Iliescu (born 4 March 1930) is the widow of the 1st President of Romania Ion Iliescu since Romania became a democratic country after the fall of the communist regime on 25 December 1989. She was the First Lady of Romania from 1989 to 1996 and again from 2000 to 2004.

She was born as Elena Șerbănescu, in the Crângași neighborhood of Bucharest. Her father died in 1945, while her mother had difficulties raising her and her sister. She met her future husband in 1948, when they were both 18-year-old students, she at the Iulia Hasdeu National College (Bucharest), and he at the Saint Sava High School, in Bucharest.
