= Robert Negoiță =

Romanian politician and businessman (born 1972)

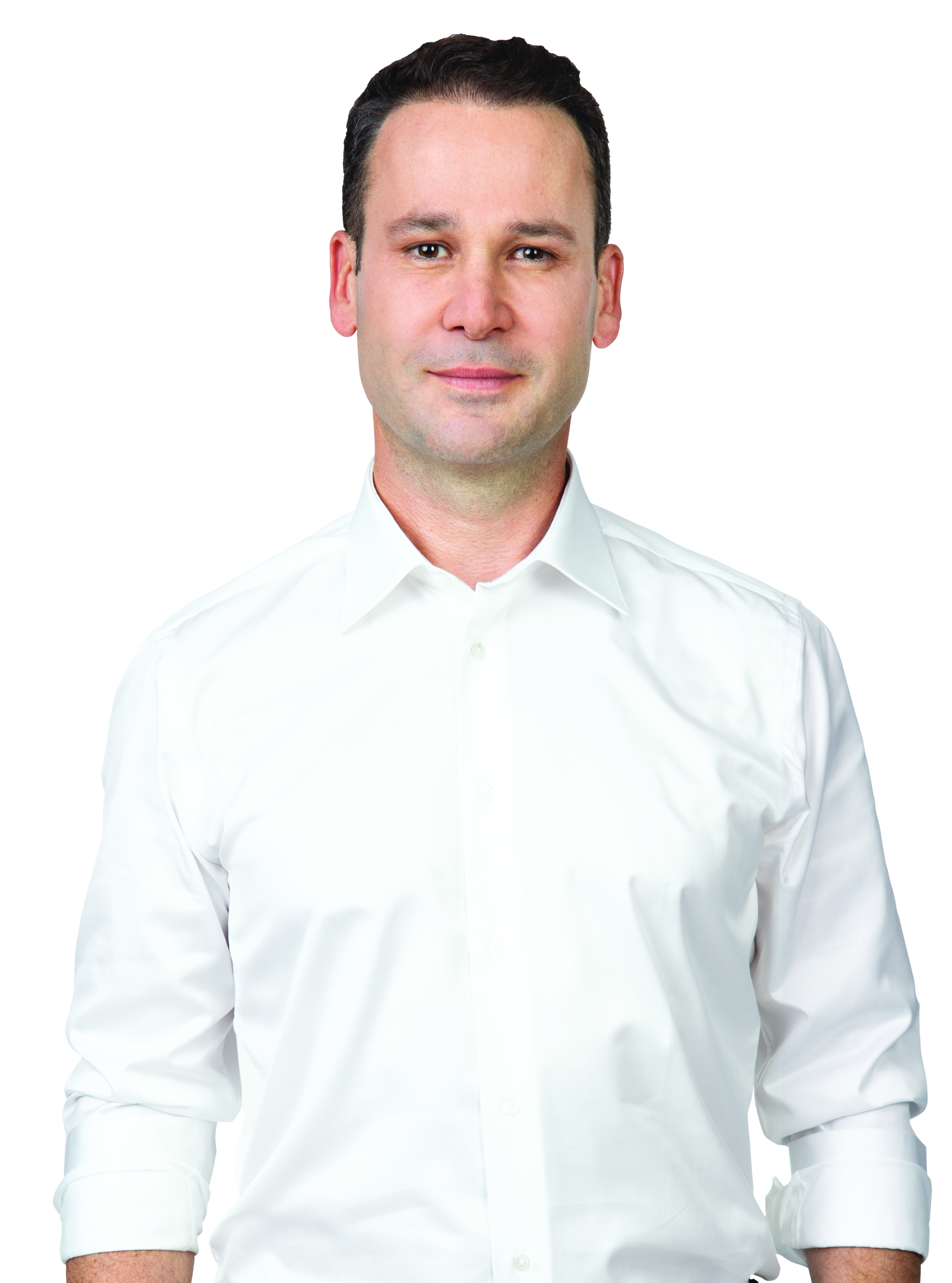

Mayor of Sector 3, Bucharest
- Incumbent
- Assumed office June 2012
- Preceded by: Liviu Negoiță

Member of the Chamber of Deputies
- In office 2008 – June 2012

Personal details
- Born: 29 March 1972 (age 54) Măneciu, Prahova County, Socialist Republic of Romania
- Party: Social Democratic Party (PSD)
- Spouse(s): Magdalena Negoiță (1996–2008); Sorina Negoiță (2009–2016)
- Children: 3
- Parent(s): Lidia and Ilie Negoiță
- Education: Bioterra University; Romanian-American University

Robert Sorin Negoiță (born 29 March 1972) is a Romanian politician and businessman. Placed on one of the top spots of Capital magazine's richest Romanians list, he is currently the mayor of Bucharest's Sector 3.

== Life and career ==
=== Family and education ===
A native of Măneciu, Prahova County, Negoiță finished high school at the age of 31. He graduated Law School (Bioterra University) in 2007 and Economics and Tourism (Romanian-American University).

His parents, Ilie and Lidia Negoiță, were married in 1968; he has two older sisters and a younger brother. Because they share the same name, he is often thought to be related to Liviu Negoiță, which is a misconception. Robert Negoiță married his first wife, Magdalena, in 1996; they had a son in 1998 and a daughter in 2000, and divorced in 2008. In 2009, he met Sorina Docuz, whom he married in the summer of 2013; they had a son that November.

Robert Negoiță finished highschool in 2003, at the age of 31. In 2004 he enrolled concurrently in two faculties: Bioterra University - Faculty of Law (private university) and Romanian-American University - Faculty of Economy, National and International Tourism. He graduated from the former in three years and from the later in four years. In 2009, Robert Negoita enrolled for a PhD at the Police Academy without achieving a master's degree beforehand even though since 2006 under the Bologna Conventional, a master's degree was a compulsory condition for enrolling in a PhD programme. In May 2016, journalist Emilia Sercan uncovered that Robert Negoita's PhD thesis was entirely plagiarized using articles published online by such authors as Nouriel Roubini and Mugur Isărescu.

=== Businesses ===
He started his business career in 1997, shortly after returning from abroad, when he became the administrator of Euroline. He built his first business, together with his brother Ionuț Negoiță, in 1998. They launched Pro Confort, a company specialized in flooring products. The company was an overnight success which determined the two brothers to diversify their business. Thus, Pro Confort started manufacturing insulated windows, doors and furniture. This will lead to the creation of Confort Group. The company starts to evolve past the manufacturing of these products and starts focusing on the hotel industry.

The partnership between Confort Group and Pro Hotels led to the inauguration, in 2003, of the first Confort Hotel, located in Otopeni. The next year a new Confort hotel was opened, this time in the heart of Bucharest. In 2007, Ionuţ and Robert Negoiţă open Rin Grand Hotel, the biggest hotel in Europe. It is located in Bucharest, Vitan neighborhood, and it has 1,460 rooms, 42 conference rooms, several restaurants, spa, gym, etc. In 2011, half of the hotel was transformed into residential apartments.

Confort Group was expanded with the creation of Domus Stil - a real estate development company (Confort Residence, Confort Park and Confort City). Confort Group also developed the first aqua park in Romania. Located 6 km outside Bucharest, Water Park Otopeni was opened in the summer of 2004. Water Park is Romania's biggest aqua park.

== Political career ==
Negoiță started his political career in 2004 when he joined the Social Democratic Party (PSD). In 2004 he became the vice president of the Social Democratic Youth (TSD; PSD's youth organization) and an important figure within the party's organization. In the second half of 2007, he launched, within TSD, The Young Social Democrats Entrepreneur League (LTISD) and became its president. Its mission was to solve the needs of taxpayers, and act as a bridge between the business community and society. Since it was founded, LTISD was involved in several public debates and came up with solutions for various problems. One of these was the implementation of differential taxation on land and property in order to reduce speculating and stop the rapid increase of real estate prices.

He was voted vice president of PSD during the 2010 Extraordinary Congress. On July 7, 2010, Negoiță was voted president of the Ilfov County PSD chapter and starting 2011 he was the interim leader of PSD's Bucharest Sector 3 branch.

He resigned from all positions held at Rin Group and other businesses and in the winter of 2008 he ran for a seat in the Romanian Chamber of Deputies. He was elected for a Teleorman County seat.

Negoiță was selected as the Social Liberal Union’s candidate for Bucharest's 3rd Sector municipal election, which was held in June 2012. On June 10, 2012, Negoiță was elected as mayor. In 2020, during the coronavirus pandemic and Romanian local elections, Negoiță switched parties from PSD to PRO Romania. He was diagnosed with COVID-19 in August 2020 and was retroactively sacked from his mayoral position from the PSD government in what was seen as a retaliation of his party switch.

== Electoral history ==
=== Mayor of Sector 3 ===
Election	Affiliation	Main round		
Election	Affiliation	Votes	Percentage	Position
2012	USL	93,784	56.47%	1st
2016	PSD (supported by UNPR)	74,645	60.25%	1st
2020	Independent (supported by PRO Romania Social-Liberal)	58,786	43.74%	1st
2024	CNR	82,381	53.94%	1st

== Cultural and social ==
Negoiță is a theatre aficionado. The Robert Negoiță Foundation organized, at Rin Grand Hotel, in partnership with some of Bucharest's most renowned theatres, several shows: Passion at Rin Grand Hotel (an adaptation of Murder at Howard Johnson), I Am a Blind Man, and Rendez-Vous.
