= 2020 Romanian local elections =

Local Romanian elections held on 27 September 2020

- 2020

Local elections were held in Romania on 27 September 2020. Initially planned for June 2020, the emergence of the COVID-19 pandemic led the Government of Romania to postpone the elections to a date no later than 31 December 2020, and extending all the terms of the local offices due to expire on 5 June 2020.

The aforementioned decision was deemed unconstitutional, and, in the end, a law was passed that extended the terms of the local officials up to 30 November 2020, and allowed the elections to be called by the Parliament, rather than by the Government, no later than that day. On 8 July 2020, the Parliament of Romania adopted a law setting the date of the elections on 27 September 2020.

== Rules ==
Using a first past the post system, the following offices will be contested:

- All commune, town, and city councils (Local Councils, Romanian: Consilii Locale), and the Sectors Local Councils of Bucharest (Romanian: Consilii Locale de Sector)
- The 41 County Councils (Romanian: Consilii Județene), and the Bucharest Municipal General Council (Romanian: Consiliul General Al Municipiului București)
- The 41 Presidents of the County Councils (Romanian: Președinții Consiliilor Județene)
- All mayors (Romanian: Primării)
  - Of the communes, cities, and municipalities
  - Of the Sectors of Bucharest (Romanian: Primării de Sector)
  - The General Mayor of The Municipality of Bucharest (Romanian: Primarul General al Municipiului București)

== Polls ==
Date	Poll source	Sample size	PSD	PNL	USR	PLUS	UDMR	ALDE	PMP	PRO	Other	Lead
28 Aug–4 Sep 2020	CURS	1,067	26%	33%	16%		4%	4%	5%	7%	5%	7%
1–7 May 2020	BCS	1,545	25.3%	32.7%	19.8%		5.9%	1.7%	5.3%	5.2%	4%	7.4%
11–15 April 2020	BCS	1,008	25.8%	34%	16.5%		4.2%	2.1%	6%	5.8%	5.7%	8.2%

=== Exit polls ===
==== Bucharest ====
2020 Local Election in Bucharest

Date	Poll source	Gabriela Firea (PSD)	Nicușor Dan (PNL-USR-PLUS)	Traian Băsescu (PMP)	Călin Popescu-Tăriceanu (ALDE)	Others	Lead
27 Sep, 19:30	CURS-Avangarde	39%	47.2%	8.6%	1.6%	3.6%	8.2%
27 Sep, 21:00	CURS-Avangarde	38.2%	47.8%	9.4%	1.6%	3%	9.6%
27 Sep	Sociopol	44%	45%	7%	—	4%	1%

Notes

All times expressed in the EEST time zone.
Nicușor Dan, an independent candidate, was supported by a political alliance formed in Bucharest by the PNL and the 2020 USR-PLUS Alliance.

==== Constanța ====
Date	Poll source	Decebal Făgădău (PSD)	Vergil Chițac (PNL)	Stelian Ion (USR-PLUS)	Mircea Titus Dobre (PRO Romania)	Claudiu Palaz (PMP)	Horia Constantinescu (PPU-SL)	Corina Martin (PER)	Victor Cruceanu (ALDE)	Anton Traian Antoniadis (The Hellenic Union (Note: (Romanian: Uniunea Elenă)))	Others
27 Sep, 19:30	CURS-Avangarde	23.5%	29%	29%	1.7%	2.9%	3.5%	3.5%	1.3%	1.1%	4.5%
27 Sep, 21:00	CURS-Avangarde	22.8%	28.5%	28.5%	1.7%	3.1%	3.6%	3.6%	1.3%	1.3%	5.6%

== Results ==
Summary of the 2020 Romanian local elections results
Party	Mayor of Bucharest (PGMB)			Mayors (P)			Local Councils seats (CL)			County Councils seats (CJ)		
Party	Votes	%	Seats	Votes	%	Seats	Votes	%	Seats	Votes	%	Seats
National Liberal Party (Romanian: Partidul Național Liberal - PNL)	282,631 (USR PLUS)	42.81% (USR PLUS)	1	2,578,820	34.58%	1,232	2,420,413	32.88%	14,182	2,212,904	30.76%	474
Social Democratic Party (Romanian: Partidul Social Democrat - PSD)	250,690	37.97%	0	2,262,791	30.34%	1,362	2,090,777	28.40%	13,820	1,605,721	22.32%	362
USR PLUS (Romanian: Alianța 2020 USR PLUS - USR PLUS)	282,631 (PNL)	42.81% (PNL)	1	490,362	6.58%	28	504,563	6.85%	1,207	478,659	6.65%	65
People's Movement Party (Romanian: Partidul Mișcarea Populară - PMP)	72,556	10.99%	0	353,005	4.73%	50	420,791	5.72%	2,137	423,147	5.88%	67
PRO Romania (Romanian: PRO România - PRO RO)	5,315	0.80%	0	331,878	4.45%	36	381,535	5.18%	1,885	356,030	4.95%	56
Democratic Alliance of Hungarians in Romania (Romanian: Uniunea Democrată Maghiară din România - UDMR/RMDSZ)	-	-	-	299,334	4.01%	199	362,442	4.92%	2,360	379,924	5.28%	92
Alliance of Liberals and Democrats (Romanian: Alianța Liberalilor și Democraților - ALDE)	9,892	1.49%	0	124,649	1.67%	15	189,665	2.58%	861	209,411	2.91%	15
Other political parties, independent contenders, and local alliances	39,034	5.91%	0	1,140,903	15.30%	282	1,086,907	14.76%	3,448	1,528,189	21.24%	209
Total:	660,118	100	1	7,457,093	100	3,176	7,361,818	100	39,900	7,193,985	100	1,340
Notes
Sources: Romanian Permanent Electoral Authority

== Deaths ==
The former PMP mayor of Sadova, Eugen Safta, who had just gotten re-elected, suffered a heart attack and died. His death was declared on 28 September 2020, at 2 AM EEST.

Ion Aliman, the PSD mayor of Deveselu, was re-elected for a third term, despite having had died of COVID-19 10 days earlier. He received 1,020 votes, out of a total of 1,600. Until a term of partial elections will be held, the vice mayor will have acting mayor attributions.

== Electoral maps ==
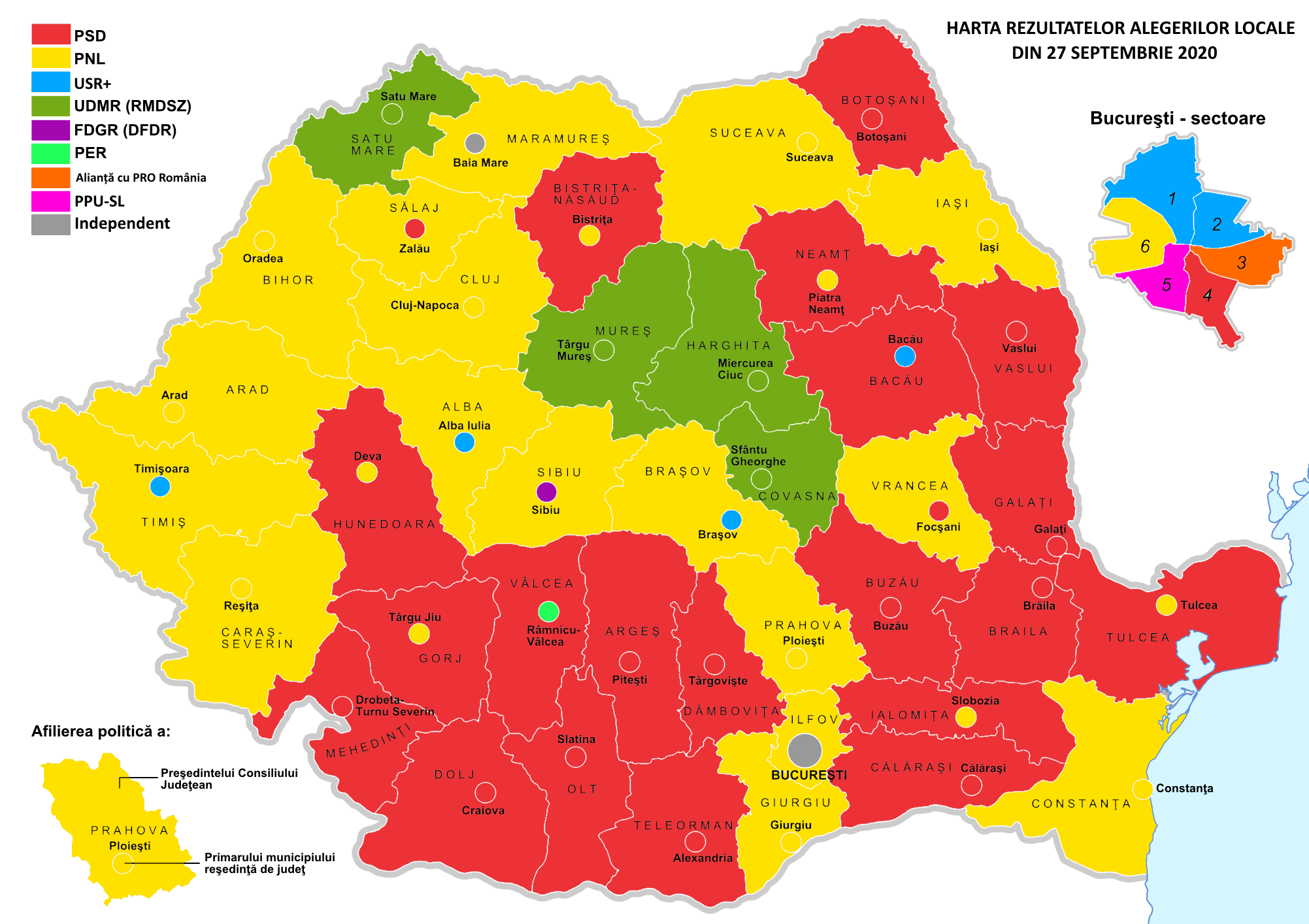
Map depicting the county council presidents and mayors of the county seat cities/towns (Romanian: Oraș reședință de județ) according to the colour of the winning party

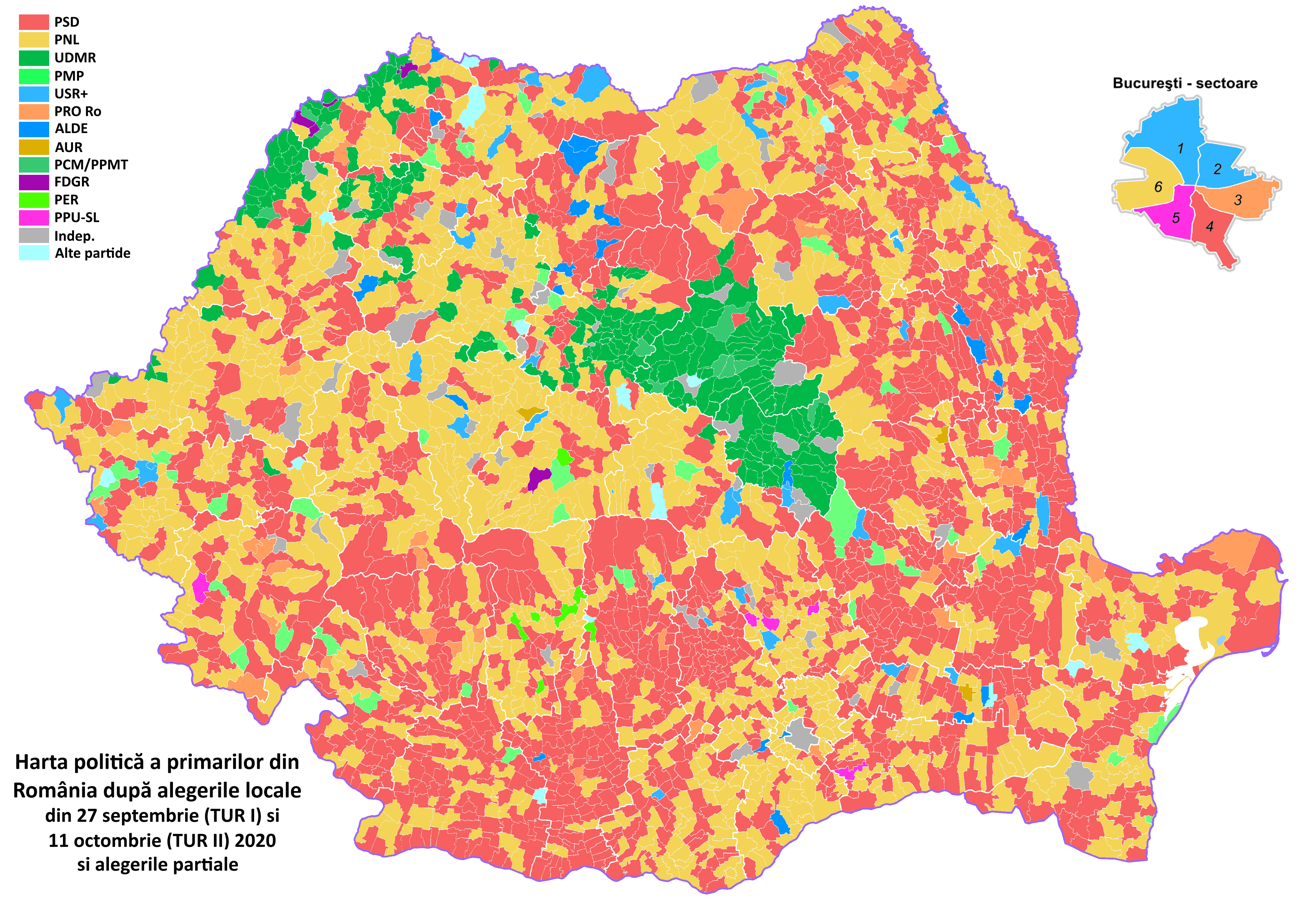
Map depicting the localities according to the colour of the elected mayor

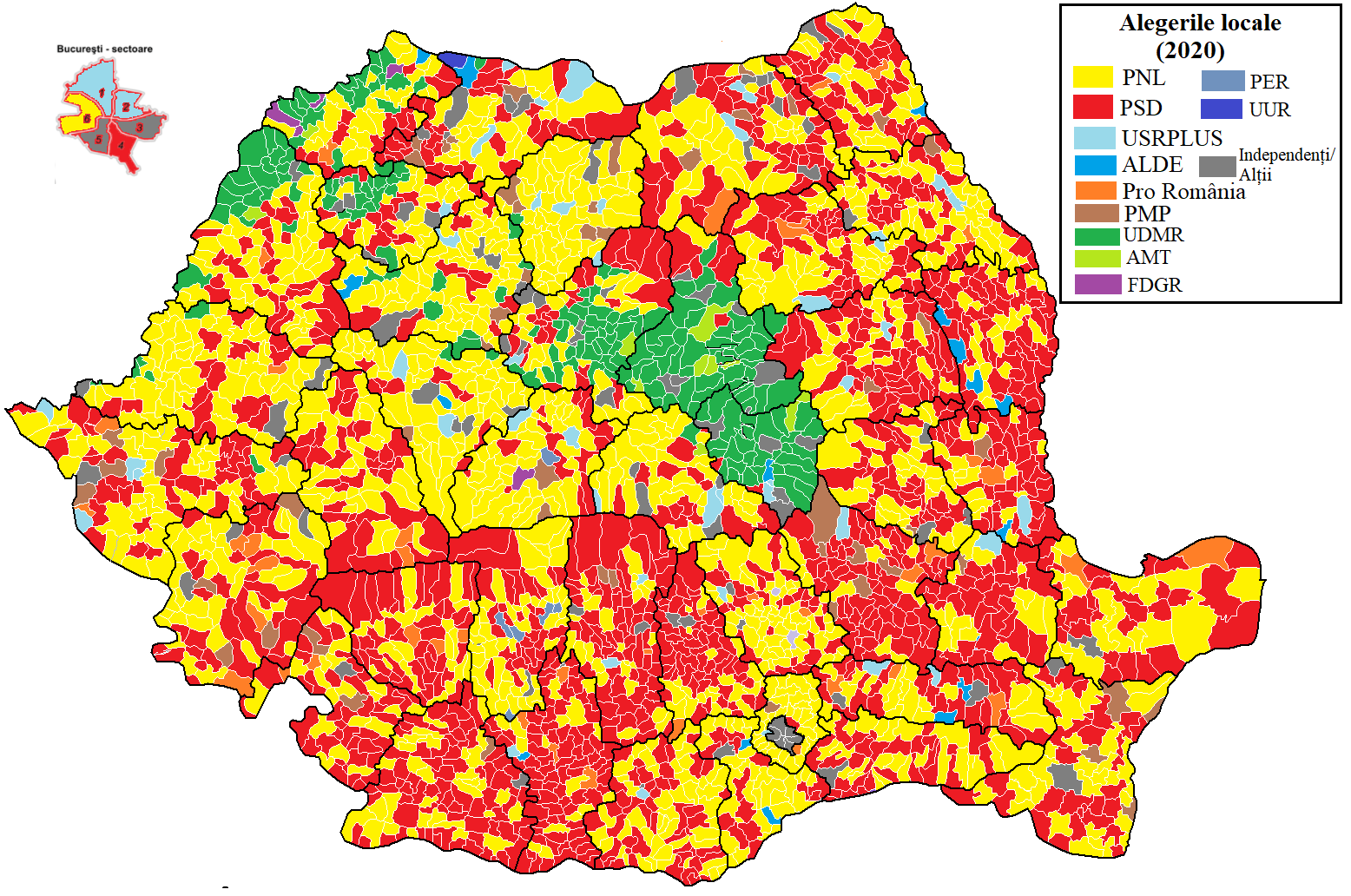
Map depicting the overall winning party by electoral unit
