= Maria Băsescu =

Former First Lady of Romania

First Lady of Romania
- In role December 20, 2004 – December 21, 2014
- President: Traian Basescu
- Preceded by: Nina Iliescu
- Succeeded by: Carmen Iohannis

Personal details
- Born: Maria Andrușca; September 6, 1951 (age 75) Cajvana, Suceava County, Romania
- Spouse: Traian Băsescu (1975–present)
- Children: 2, including Elena

Maria Băsescu (née Andrușca) (born September 6, 1951) is the wife of the 4th President of Romania Traian Băsescu. She was the First Lady of Romania from 2004 to 2014.

== Honours ==
- Spain:
  - Dame Grand Cross of the Order of Isabella the Catholic (2007)
