= Save Bucharest Union =

Save Bucharest Union Uniunea Salvaţi Bucureștiul
- Abbreviation: USB
- Founder: Nicușor Dan
- Founded: 1 July 2015
- Dissolved: 21 August 2016
- Succeeded by: USR
- Headquarters: Str. Carol Davila Nr. 91; Sector 5 Bucharest
- Ideology: Populism; Anti-corruption; Economic liberalism Localism
- Political position: Centre-right
- National affiliation: USR
- Colors: Blue
- General Council of Bucharest: 17 / 55
- Local Council of Sector 1: 9 / 27
- Local Council of Sector 2: 9 / 27
- Local Council of Sector 3: 10 / 32
- Local Council of Sector 4: 9 / 27
- Local Council of Sector 5: 5 / 27
- Local Council of Sector 6: 8 / 27

Website
- http://usb.ro/

The Save Bucharest Union (Romanian: Uniunea Salvaţi Bucureștiul, USB) was a local Romanian political party that later became the Bucharest branch of the Save Romania Union (Romanian: Uniunea Salvați România, USR) operating in Bucharest, Romania. The party was founded on 1 July 2015 by Save Bucharest Association (USB) president and civic activist Nicușor Dan (President of Romania and former Mayor of Bucharest serving from 2020 to 2025).

== 2016 Romanian local election results ==
The USB competed in the 2016 local elections in Bucharest and nearly all of its sectors (aside from Sector 5), managing to score the following results:

=== Bucharest ===
Constituency	USB mayoral candidate	Votes	Percentage
Bucharest	Nicușor Dan	175,119	30.52%
Sector 1	Clotilde Armand	21,504	28.78%
Sector 2	Antoaneta Bugner	16,360	16.02%
Sector 3	Roxana Wring	21,041	16.99%
Sector 4	Dumitru Dobrev	15,454	17.91%
Sector 6	Mihail Daneș	22,430	20.79%

=== National ===
Election	County Councilors (CJ)			Mayors			Local Councilors (CL)			Popular vote	%	Position
Election	Votes	%	Seats	Votes	%	Seats	Votes	%	Seats	Popular vote	%	Position
2016	143,544	1.73	15 / 1,434	96,789	1.13	0 / 3,186	121,099	1.44	39 / 40,067	143,544	1.73	7th
