= Elena Băsescu =

Romanian politician (born 1980)

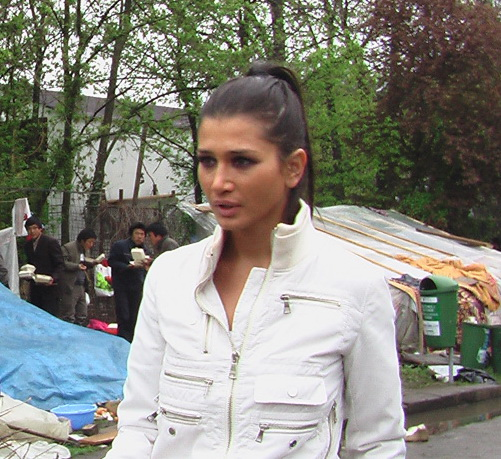
- Elena Băsescu in 2009

Member of the European Parliament
- In office 14 July 2009 – 17 April 2014
- Constituency: Romania

Personal details
- Born: 24 April 1980 (age 46) Constanța, Romania
- Party: Democratic Liberal Party
- Other political affiliations: European People's Party
- Parent(s): Traian Băsescu, Maria Băsescu
- Occupation: Model

Elena Băsescu, sometimes referred to as EBA, (born 24 April 1980) is a Romanian politician who served as the former secretary general of the youth wing of Romania's Democratic Liberal Party and as Member of the European Parliament between 2009 and 2014. She is the younger daughter of Traian Băsescu, the former President of Romania, who was in office from 2004 to 2014. She was formerly a model, and entered politics in 2007. She has a degree in economics.

== Political career ==
Before standing for elections on her own, she was an intern of the MEP Monica Iacob Ridzi. Elena Băsescu stood as a candidate for the European Parliament in the 2009 election. She had sought to stand as a candidate for her father's Democratic Liberal Party, but was rejected by the party, in particular by intellectuals like Alina Mungiu-Pippidi, so she ran as an independent. Nonetheless, she "wasted no time in gathering 200,000 signatures for her candidacy". L'Express noted that her candidacy still caused some concern in the party, due to fears that she might draw votes away from it. Her initial popularity in opinion polls was high (16%), but subsequently dropped to 5 or 6% shortly before the election. However 75% of the electorate did not vote in sign of protest, this being the lowest turnout in Romanian history for an election, and the percentage that voted for her was from a minority composed of the members of the party that was once ruled by her father Traian Băsescu, the President of Romania at the time. During the campaign she caused some controversy after declaring herself in favor of legalizing marijuana use. Prior to her election journalists discovered that some members of the Democratic Liberal Party were instructed to vote for her in order to secure her election. She immediately rejoined the Democratic Liberal Party after she was elected to the European Parliament, and subsequently is also a member of the European People's Party. Due to Elena's support for marijuana legalization and allegations of nepotism, Hungarian MEP László Surján questioned her entry into the EPP group in an email sent to all EPP members.

== Personal and political image ==
Oana Lungescu, a Romanian BBC reporter, described her in 2009 as a "sexy celebrity" and the "Paris Hilton of Romania" because she is "known to be more interested in parties than party politics", and notes that "video clips of her verbal gaffes are internet hits." Similarly, L'Express described her as having had to "face accusations of nepotism and incompetence, fuelled by her series of gaffes and grammatical blunders". Alison Mutler, an Associated Press writer, published a story in which an unnamed critic describes Băsescu as "an inflatable Barbie doll". Elena Băsescu considered herself and her father defamed by the article, described Mutler as "politically partisan", and stated that Romania's public image has been damaged as a result of Mutler's writing. She also took offense at Mutler's own description that she "prances down the catwalk, goes clubbing until the wee hours and mangles her grammar", pointing out her degree in banking and finance, the fact that she had quit modeling two years before running for an EP seat, and described her own presence in clubs as characterized by "decent behavior, without affecting in any way those around her."

Elena Băsescu's association with Monica Iacob Ridzi, who has been accused of embezzlement before she resigned as Youth Minister in 2009, was exploited by Romanian media critical of Traian Băsescu, such as Realitatea TV. Traian Băsescu accused media hostile to him, in particular that owned by Sorin Ovidiu Vântu, of trying to promote guilt by association, by repeatedly broadcasting these images.

=== European elections ===
Election	Votes	Percentage	MEPs	Position	Political group
2009	204,280	4.22%	1 / 33	6th	EPP
