= Nicușor Dan =

President of Romania since 2025

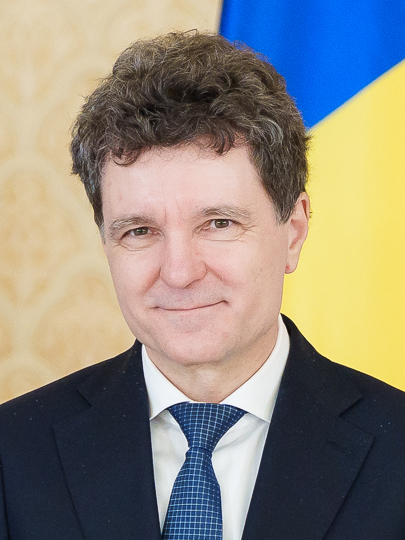
- Dan in 2026

President of Romania
- Incumbent
- Assumed office 26 May 2025
- Prime Minister: Cătălin Predoiu (acting); Ilie Bolojan; Luca Niculescu
- Preceded by: Klaus Iohannis

Mayor of Bucharest
- In office 29 October 2020 – 26 May 2025
- Preceded by: Gabriela Firea
- Succeeded by: Stelian Bujduveanu (acting); Ciprian Ciucu

Member of the Chamber of Deputies
- In office 21 December 2016 – 20 October 2020
- Constituency: Bucharest
Further offices held
Member of the General Council of the Municipality of Bucharest
In office 23 June 2016 – 21 December 2016
Mayor	Gabriela Firea
President of the Save Romania Union
In office 28 July 2016 – 1 June 2017
Preceded by	Himself (as President of the Save Bucharest Union)
Succeeded by	Elek Levente (acting)

Personal details
- Born: Nicușor Daniel Dan; 20 December 1969 (age 56) Făgăraș, Brașov County, Socialist Republic of Romania
- Party: Independent (since 2017)
- Other political affiliations: USB (2015–2016); USR (2016–2017)
- Domestic partner: Mirabela Grădinaru
- Children: 2
- Scientific career
- Education: University of Bucharest (BS); École Normale Supérieure (MS); Paris 13 University (PhD)
- Fields: Mathematics
- Workplaces: Institute of Mathematics of the Romanian Academy; Școala Normală Superioară București
- Thesis: Courants de Green et prolongement méromorphe (1998)
- Doctoral advisors: Christophe Soulé; Daniel Barsky

Nicușor Daniel Dan (Note: Romanian pronunciation: [nikuˈʃor daniˈel ˈdan].) (born 20 December 1969) is a Romanian mathematician and politician serving as the seventh President of Romania since 2025. He previously served as the Mayor of Bucharest from 2020 to 2025 and as a member of the Chamber of Deputies from 2016 to 2020.

Born in Făgăraș, Brașov County, Dan studied mathematics at the University of Bucharest before continuing his studies in France, where he obtained a Master's degree from the École normale supérieure and a PhD from Paris 13 University. After returning to Romania, he founded the Școala Normală Superioară București, a research institution in mathematics, and participated in civic initiatives concerning urban governance and heritage preservation.

In 2015, Dan founded the Save Bucharest Union (USB), a political party focused on anti-corruption and urban development. He co-founded the Save Romania Union (USR) in 2016 and resigned in 2017 following internal disagreements regarding the party's ideological direction, subsequently advocating a big tent approach centred on institutional reform. He served in the Chamber of Deputies from 2016 until he was elected mayor of Bucharest in 2020. He was re-elected in 2024 and served until he was elected president. As mayor, his administration oversaw public infrastructure projects, municipal financial policy, and administrative reforms.

Dan was elected President of Romania in May 2025 as an independent candidate, with second-round support from the USR, the National Liberal Party (PNL), and the Democratic Union of Hungarians (UDMR), defeating George Simion of the Alliance for the Union of Romanians (AUR). He campaigned on a strong pro-European Union and pro-NATO platform. His presidency has been marked by political instability, including the collapse of a governing coalition led by Prime Minister Ilie Bolojan, president of the PNL, following a motion of no confidence in May 2026.

Throughout 2026, Dan's contacts with leaders of the Social Democratic Party (PSD) and figures within the American Republican Party were characterised by some commentators as a political realignment towards soft euroscepticism, although he disputed this characterisation. In October that year, Dan's fourth nominee for prime minister, independent diplomat Luca Niculescu, brought the PSD into a mixed technocratic-political government in an effort to end the political stalemate.

== Early life and education ==
Born in Făgăraș, Brașov County, Dan attended the Radu Negru High School in his native city, graduating in 1988. He came first in the International Mathematical Olympiads in 1987 and 1988 with perfect scores. Dan moved to Bucharest at the age of 18 and began studying mathematics at the University of Bucharest.

In 1992, he moved to France to continue studying mathematics; he attended the École Normale Supérieure, one of the most prestigious French grandes écoles, where he earned a master's degree. In 1998 Dan completed a PhD in mathematics at Paris 13 University, with thesis "Courants de Green et prolongement méromorphe" written under the direction of Christophe Soulé and Daniel Barsky. He returned to Bucharest that year, giving as reasons the cultural differences and the desire to change Romania.

Dan was one of the creators and the first administrative director of the Școala Normală Superioară București, a university set up on the model of the French École Normale Supérieure within the Romanian Academy's Institute of Mathematics. As of 2011, he was a professor of mathematics at the institute.

== Activism ==
In 1998, Dan founded Asociația "Tinerii pentru Acțiune Civică" ("Young People for Civic Action" Association), for which he wanted to gather a thousand young people who wanted to change Romania, which was his stated goal for returning to the country. Despite failing in its goals, the association did organise two forums for young people who studied abroad, in 2000 and 2002, to which a few hundred people participated. As a result of these forums, the "Ad Astra" Association of Romanian researchers was created in 2000.

=== Save Bucharest Association ===
Dan founded the Asociația "Salvați Bucureștiul" ("Save Bucharest" Association) in 2006 as a reaction to the demolition of architectural heritage houses and the building of high-rise buildings in protected Bucharest neighborhoods, as well as the diminishing number of green space areas in Bucharest.

In March 2008, the association published the "Bucharest, an urbanistic disaster" Report, which discussed Bucharest's problems and ways to overcome them. In the same year, during the elections, together with other NGOs, the association drafted a Pact for Bucharest, which was signed by all the candidates for mayor of Bucharest. On April Fools' Day in 2012, Dan published a list of 100 electoral promises made by elected mayor of Bucharest Sorin Oprescu which were not kept, including the "Pact for Bucharest".

The association was involved in many court cases, winning 23 against the local authorities of Bucharest. Among them are the cancellation of a project which would have built a water park on 7 hectares of Tineretului Park, saving from demolition a number of heritage buildings on Șoseaua Kiseleff no. 45, and the cancellation of a project which would have built a glass building on top of Palatul Știrbei on Calea Victoriei. The association was also able to push for some changes in 2009 to the urban planning law.

== Early political career ==
=== 2012 local elections ===
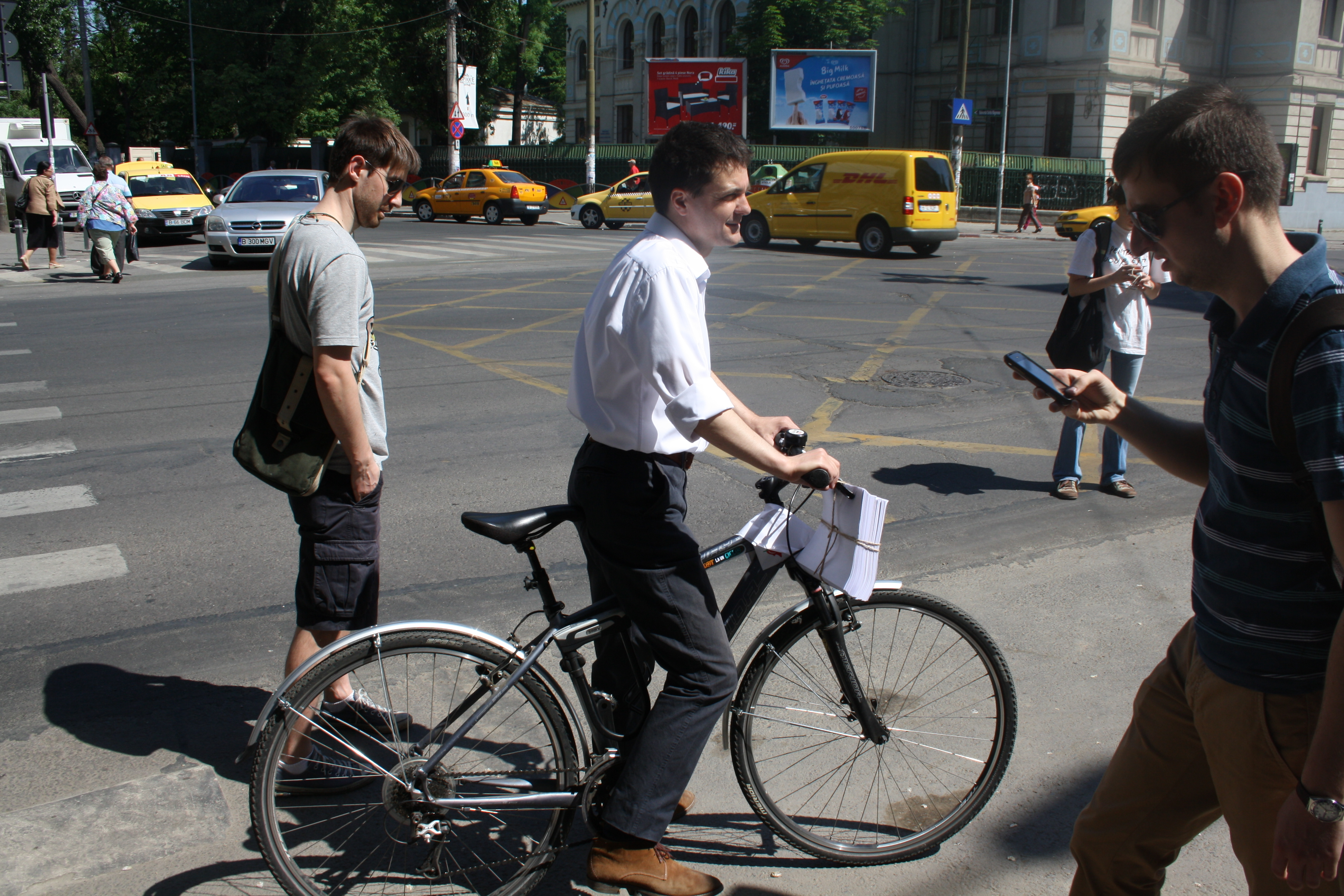
Dan on a bicycle during his electoral campaign for Mayor of Bucharest in 2012

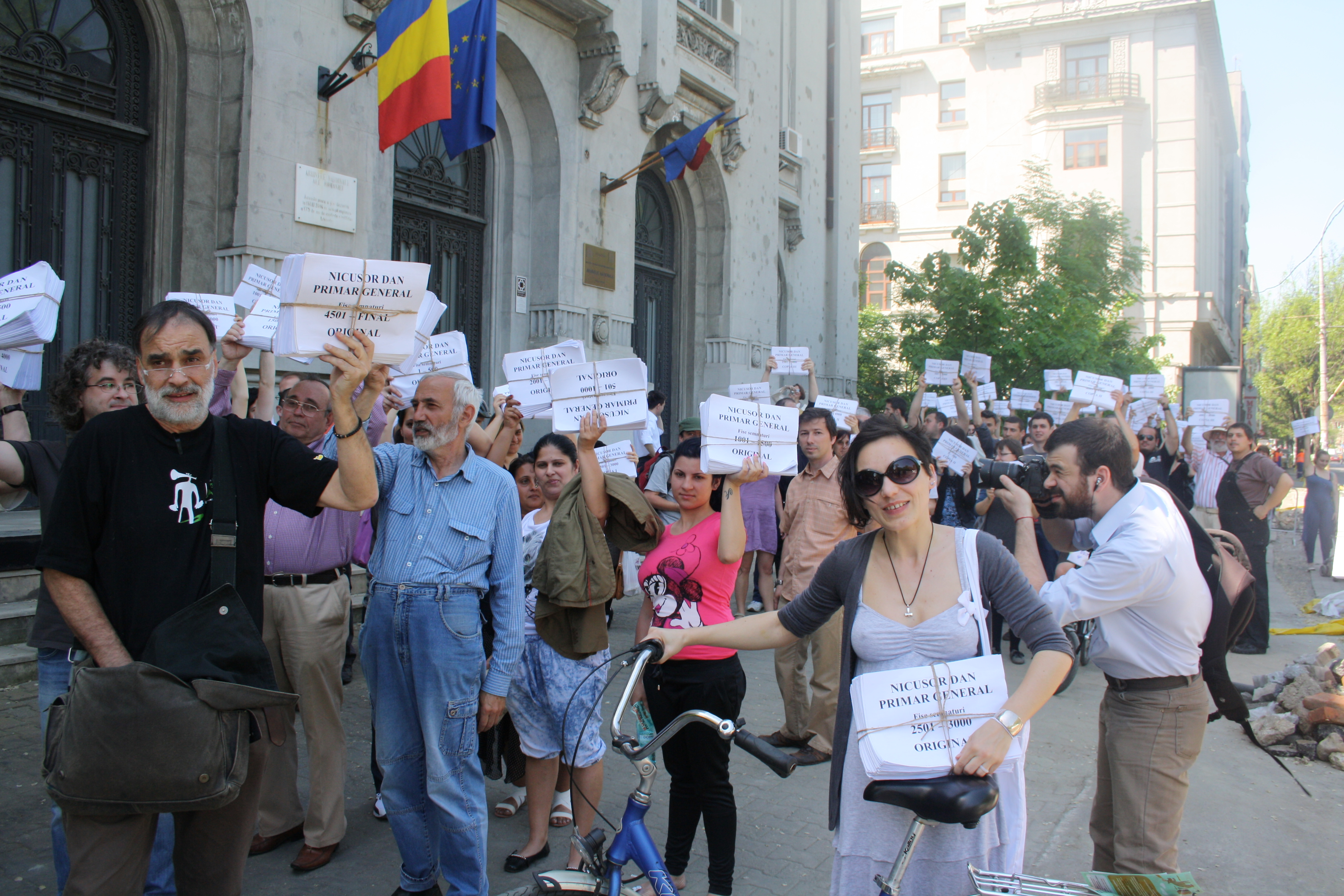
Volunteers in Dan's campaign carrying the signatures to the Electoral Bureau

Dan announced his candidacy for Mayor of Bucharest in November 2011 at a café on Arthur Verona Street, with just a few guests, including Theodor Paleologu, a historian and Member of Parliament. For gathering the 36,000 signatures needed for his candidacy, having the backing of no party, he relied on a network of volunteers organised on Facebook. On 22 April 15 bands and musicians performed pro-bono at Arenele Romane for Dan's campaign in order to help him gather the signatures. During the 12-hour-long concert, volunteers gathered 4,000 signatures.

==== Political positions and programme ====
Among his proposed projects are the creation of a light rail infrastructure over the existing rail lines in Bucharest, creating an infrastructure for prioritising public transport over other traffic in intersections, consolidating buildings that are likely to be affected by earthquakes, protecting the urban green space and clearing illegal buildings from parks. Dan argues that it is important to incentivise young people to stay in the city, by making it a regional hub in IT, creative industries and higher education, and attracting investors and skilled people from across the region.

==== Support and opinions on his candidacy ====
Dan received support from Andrei Pleșu, who argued that Dan was the only one of the candidates who was interested in the architecture of Bucharest and did not support any utopian initiatives. He also received support from political scientist and Member of the European Parliament Cristian Preda. Dan gained the support of some journalists who wrote about him in op-eds from several newspapers: Andrei Crăciun of Adevărul saw in him "a Don Quijote untouched by the vulgar lard of undeserved riches" and "a person who works against the system". Florin Negruțiu, the editor-in-chief of Gândul thought he was an "atypical candidate" for Bucharest, the model candidate of the intellectuals; nevertheless, the journalist did not see any chances that Dan would become mayor, because he was "too serious" a candidate, and unlikely to appeal to the masses. Neculai Constantin Munteanu from Radio Free Europe wrote that he supported Dan for his unselfish way of caring about Bucharest and that his opponents were "comedians", from whom one could "admire the imposture, ludicrousness, and incompetence".

=== 2016 local elections ===
Having registered Save Bucharest Union (USB) as a political party in 2015, Dan ran again for Mayor of Bucharest in 2016. This time, the 2016 Romanian local elections were held in a single round. He gained 30.52% of the total votes, losing to the social-democrat candidate, Gabriela Firea, who gained 42.97% of the total votes. In the election, Dan managed to attract the young electorate, with over half of his voters being under the age of 40. Some of USB's candidates for sector mayor have also performed well in their respective races, proving USB's viability as a future political force.

=== Save Romania Union ===
Wanting to capitalise on the momentum that saw him gain a third of the votes in the local elections, Dan announced shortly after the 2016 local election that the Save Bucharest Union would change its name to Save Romania Union (USR), shifting its focus to a national stage. He also announced plans for the new party to enter the 2016 Romanian parliamentary election. With Dan at the top of the candidate list, USR gained 8.92% of the vote in the Senate race and 8.87% in the Chamber of Deputies, which made them the third largest party in Romania. The result also meant that Dan became a member of the Chamber of Deputies.

==== Departure from USR ====
In 2017, anti-same-sex NGO Coaliția pentru Familie managed to raise the necessary number of signatures to organise a referendum that would change the part of the Romanian Constitution dealing with marriage, with the hope of redefining it as "between a man and a woman". This created a rift within USR, between the progressive wing, who wanted USR to become the only parliamentary party to oppose the initiative, and Dan, who believed USR should not get involved in the debate and that the party should remain open for both progressives and conservatives. An internal referendum within the party followed, in which 52.7% of members voted to position the party against the Constitutional initiative, which led Dan to resign from the party on 1 June 2017. As explanation for his opposition to the National Council vote he cited religious matters, the dangers of deviating from the main party issue of fighting against corruption and his refusal to belong to a party that defines itself as a party of civil liberties.

=== Independent ===
After his resignation from USR, Dan continued to serve as a member of the Chamber of Deputies as an independent. Due to a quirk in the Romanian electoral law, USR required his signature when they attempted to legally register their alliance (2020 USR-PLUS Alliance) with the Freedom, Unity and Solidarity Party (PLUS). In order to help his former party, in March 2019 Dan briefly rejoined USR as a common member, gave the necessary signature and then resigned for a second time.

== Mayor of Bucharest (2020–2025) ==
=== 2020 local elections ===
In May 2019, Dan announced his plans to once again run for Mayor of Bucharest, as an independent. Dan mentioned that while he hoped that his candidacy would be supported by the rest of the opposition parties, he would not run against a different common candidate, unwilling to split the vote of the opposition. He was ultimately supported by both USR and the National Liberal Party (PNL). With 95% of votes counted, partial results suggested that he won the mayoral election with 42.8% of votes. Shortly afterwards exit polls showed him winning the race, he announced victory. On 5 October 2020 the Central Electoral Bureau confirmed his status as the new Mayor of Bucharest, winning the elections with a plurality of 42.81% against Gabriela Firea (37.97%), the former Mayor.

=== 2024 local elections ===
Following the decision made by the governing alliance between the National Liberal Party (PNL) and the Social Democratic Party (PSD) to hold the elections in June 2024, Dan participated once again as an independent for Mayor, for a new term. This time, he was supported by the same USR (Save Romanian Union) party, but also by two other minor parties, the People's Movement Party (PMP) and Force of the Right (FD) whose president is former PNL leader Ludovic Orban, who left the party in 2021 after losing the presidency of the party to then-prime minister Florin Cîțu; all three formed the United Right Alliance (ADU), an official national opposition to the National Coalition for Romania (CNR) formed by the PSD and PNL. Additionally, the Renewing Romania's European Project (REPER), headed by former PLUS leader Dacian Cioloș, supported Dan, but was not part of ADU. The elections were held on 9 June 2024 together with the 2024 European Parliament election in Romania, a controversial move done by the CNR earlier that year. Thought to be a close race up until the last moment, the exit polls showed the result was overwhelmingly in favour of Dan, winning with 45% of the total vote, who declared himself the winner of the race. After the vote count, Dan was the clear winner of the elections with approximately 48% of the total votes, more than double the votes given to the same runner-up from 2020, Gabriela Firea, who placed second with 22%, followed by then Sector 5 Mayor, Cristian Popescu Piedone (16%) and PNL candidate and president for the Bucharest branch of the party, Sebastian Burduja (7.6%).

During his victory speech, Dan declared his intention to organise two referendums for Bucharest, one for centralising more power to the General Mayor of Bucharest regarding building authorisations, a constant theme during his campaign, and another for allocating more financial funds to the General Mayor rather than to the Sector mayors. Both were planned to take place on the same day as the 2024 Romanian parliamentary election in order to "reduce organisational costs for separate elections" according to Dan

==== Piața Unirii incident ====
On 14 October 2024, around midnight, Sector 4 mayor Daniel Băluță (PSD) – with permission from Sector 3 mayor Robert Negoiță – sent multiple construction workers and Sector 4 local police agents to Unirii Park in order to start proceedings for the Square's foundation's consolidation. The Piața Unirii is shared between Sector 3 and Sector 4. In the morning, Dan went to the square together with his staff, telling the workers present to halt the procedure on the basis of its illegality due to a lack of permits. Allegedly, Metrorex and Apa Nova (Bucharest's water and sewage administration institution) had yet to give their approval for the consolidation work.

A conflict erupted between the Sector 4 local police agents (including its director, Cristian Pîslă, subsequently suspected of corruption) and Dan and his staff. Eventually, the Bucharest mayor returned with additional documents attesting to the fact that the City Hall of Bucharest was the legal owner of Unirii Square and the sector City Halls had no right to start consolidation proceedings on their own. During the scuffles, local police agents were observed to be especially violent, which the wide public of Bucharest viewed as proof of the agents being members of the Sector 4 Clanul Sportivilor, an organisation of the Romanian mafia operating mainly in the southern part of Bucharest who were long suspected to work with Daniel Băluță himself. The then Romanian prime minister Marcel Ciolacu intervened in the matter prompting mayor Băluță to concede; Nicușor Dan launched an investigation into the proceedings. He once again stressed the importance on the referendum held on 9 June 2024 for centralising more power to the Bucharest mayor.

== 2025 presidential campaign ==
After the Piața Unirii incident, Dan was viewed even more favourably by the general populace of Bucharest, being called a bulwark against the widespread corruption of the country and the only one to effectively stand against the PSD-PNL coalition. This led to speculation of a possible presidential candidature in the next elections. On 16 December he announced his candidacy for the 2025 Romanian presidential election, after the annulment of the 2024 Romanian presidential election due to Russian meddling in favour of winner of the first round Călin Georgescu.

His announcement came as a surprise to many, as he had previously expressed his intention to serve at least one more term as Mayor of Bucharest before the elections, stating that he "would need at least 2-3 terms to make everything right in Bucharest." This change of plans also led to a falling out with Elena Lasconi, a former supporter of Dan, who came second in the annulled 2024 elections' first round. It is widely believed that Lasconi and Dan appealed to similar voter demographics, with both targeting liberal, progressive, moderate, pro-European, and anti-PSD/anti-PNL camps. As a result, their simultaneous candidacies may have divided this voter base. The Constitutional Court validated his candidacy on 16 March along with those of George Simion and Victor Ponta. On 22 March, a random draw placed Dan at the bottom of the candidate list on the ballot. Dan came second in the first round of voting on 4 May with 20.99% of the vote. On 18 May, he faced George Simion in a runoff, winning the presidency with 53.6% of the vote.

Vote share
Second round
Nicușor Dan Ind.	53.60%
George Simion AUR	46.40%
First round
George Simion AUR	40.96%
Nicușor Dan Ind.	20.99%
Crin Antonescu A.Ro	20.07%
Victor Ponta Ind.	13.04%
Elena Lasconi USR	2.68%
Others	2.26%

== Presidency (2025–present) ==
Dan was inaugurated as president on 26 May 2025. In his inaugural address, he pledged to deal with Romania's economic problems while acknowledging that "the Romanian state is spending more than it can afford". He also pledged to become a president "open to the voice of society." On 20 June 2025, Dan nominated his immediate predecessor as president, Ilie Bolojan, to become prime minister, and to form the Bolojan cabinet. During the first weeks of his tenure, Dan was exclusively focused on the formation of the new government. Negotiations were noted to have been a lot longer than in previous years, something that was both praised and criticised by both Romanians and his peers. Throughout those respective weeks, the newly elected president's image was that of an active and communicative one, oftentimes being greeted by reporters and asked questions in the early morning, right at the gate of the house he and his family were tenants of. Another aspect that painted him in a positive light to the public was that he preferred to take his daughter to school on foot from his house, only accompanied by a SPP agent. This was a point of friction between him and the protection service due to complications arising in the security procedures regarding the president.

Internationally, Dan's presidency brought some stability in the European Union and NATO, especially concerning their Eastern border. Many analysts opined that Klaus Iohannis' inactivity and corruption scandals sidelined the state in the last months of his presidency, as well as the internal crisis that was caused by the annulment of the 2024 election, which was marred by suspicions of Russian interference; as such, Romania's internal and international situation was ambiguous and the country was not invited to a security summit in Paris in February 2025. His election also marked a steady increase in appreciation of the Romanian currency against the Euro after weeks of increases due to market uncertainty in late Spring of 2025, together with a decrease in investment risk for foreign firms. He signed into law substantial legislation since taking office, concerning health system reform, removing housing subsidies for senators and deputies, foreign official corruption, fiscal and budgetary reforms agreed upon by the government in the context of economic rebound, and environmental and agricultural regulation.

== Political positions ==
=== Geopolitical alignment ===
Dan has consistently advocated pro-Western views, emphasising Romania's integration into the European Union and NATO as cornerstones of national security and economic progress. In his 2025 presidential campaign, Dan positioned himself as a staunch defender of Western democratic values; he supported NATO's presence in Romania, particularly amid the Russian invasion of Ukraine, contrasting sharply with Simion's nationalism and Euroscepticism. Dan is a Ukrainophile and advocates for stronger Romanian support to Ukraine. Dan faced accusations over his ties with businessman Matei Păun, who was linked to Russian and Belarusian firms and oligarchs. Păun's firm, BAC Financial Advisory SRL, acquired Getica OOH in 2011 from News Corp via Russian VTB Bank and Alpha Capital Partners. Păun allegedly boasted of financing Belarusian leader Alexander Lukashenko and made statements questioning 2014 Western sanctions on Russia, praising Russian Orthodox "mysticism", and doubting Ukraine's Orange Revolution and Crimea's annexation.

=== LGBTQ+ issues ===
In 2000, Dan published an article in the magazine Dilema in which he stated his rejection of "homosexual behaviour in public spaces in Romania", describing it as "an attack against traditional values" and "legitimate collective identity". The statements resurfaced after his political career took off, particularly during his much-publicised departure from USR. Dan distanced himself from his previous statements on several occasions, claiming that he is not homophobic and that his opinion on the matter has changed in the following years. In 2024, Dan expressed support for same-sex civil partnerships; however, he also believed that it was not the correct time to have a debate. In the same interview, he did not take a stance on same-sex marriage, and said that it was "a debate that society must have".

== Personal life ==
Dan lives with his long-term partner, Mirabela Grădinaru, a Renault executive. They had a daughter in May 2016 and a son in May 2022.

=== Alleged Securitate collaboration ===
In May 2024, ahead of local elections, a purported Securitate document from July 1988 emerged, detailing Dan's collaboration with the secret police of the Nicolae Ceaușescu's regime. The document contained information provided by Dan about his high school peers who participated in the International Mathematical Olympiads of 1987 and 1988. Dan denied its authenticity, claiming he had minimal contact with authorities of the time. PSD leader and Prime Minister Marcel Ciolacu questioned the document's credibility, noting its unusually polished composition. The National Council for the Study of the Securitate Archives (CNSAS) deemed it a forgery, citing incorrect dates, atypical expressions, and a writing style inconsistent with the typewriters used by the Securitate, including the absence of diacritics typical in genuine documents of the era.

== Electoral history ==
2012 Bucharest mayoral election
Party	Candidate	Votes	%
Independent (USL)	Sorin Oprescu	430,512	54.79
PDL	Silviu Prigoană	134,552	17.12
PP–DD	Horia Mocanu	74,290	9.45
Independent	Nicușor Dan	66,649	8.48
PNG	George Becali	25,076	3.19
UNPR	Anghel Iordănescu	16,095	2.04
PRM	Petre Popeangă	8,913	1.13
Others	—	29,652	3.77
Total votes		785,739	100.0

2016 Bucharest mayoral election
Party	Candidate	Votes	%
PSD	Gabriela Firea	246,553	42.97
USB	Nicușor Dan	175,119	30.52
PNL	Cătălin Predoiu	64,186	11.18
PMP	Robert Turcescu	37,098	6.46
ALDE	Daniel Barbu	17,455	3.04
Independent	Cătălin Ioan Berenghi	10,639	1.85
United Romania Party	Bogdan Diaconu	8,356	1.45
PDS	Adrian Severin	8,234	1.43
PNȚCD	Iulia Gorea-Costin	2,387	0.41
PSR	Petrică Dima	2,377	0.41
PRR	Niculae Neamțu	867	0.15
Podemo	Mirel Mircea Amariței	504	0.08
Total votes		573,775	100.0

2020 Bucharest mayoral election
Party	Candidate	Votes	%
Independent (USR PLUS/PNL)	Nicușor Dan	282,631	42.82
PSD	Gabriela Firea	250,690	37.98
PMP	Traian Băsescu	72,556	10.99
PV	Florin Călinescu	13,742	2.08
ALDE	Călin Popescu-Tăriceanu	29,892	1.50
Pro Bucharest 2020	Ioan Sîrbu	5,315	0.81
AUR	Claudiu Târziu	4,445	0.67
PRM	Ileana Nănău	3,270	0.50
PER	Valentina Bistriceanu	3,138	0.48
Others	—	14,439	2.19
Total votes		660,118	100.0

2024 Bucharest mayoral election
Party	Candidate	Votes	%
Independent (ADU/REPER)	Nicușor Dan	352,734	47.94
PSD	Gabriela Firea	163,147	22.17
PUSL	Cristian Popescu Piedone	111,411	15.14
PNL	Sebastian Burduja	57,336	7.79
AUR	Mihai Enache	22,208	3.01
SOS RO	Diana Șoșoacă	18,531	2.51
PER	Alexandru Pânișoară	3,871	0.52
Independent	Filip Constantin Titian	3,359	0.45
AD	Dorin Iacob	3,164	0.43
Total votes		735,761	100.0

2025 Romanian presidential election
Party	Candidate	Votes	%
AUR	George Simion	3,862,761	40.96
Independent	Nicușor Dan	1,979,067	20.99
A.Ro	Crin Antonescu	1,892,930	20.07
Independent	Victor Ponta	1,230,164	13.04
USR	Elena Lasconi	252,721	2.68
PUSL	Lavinia Șandru	60,682	0.64
Independent	Daniel Funeriu	49,604	0.53
PNCR	Cristian Terheș	36,445	0.39
PNR	Sebastian Popescu	25,994	0.28
Independent	John Ion Banu	22,020	0.23
PLAN	Silviu Predoiu	17,186	0.18
Total votes		9,571,740	100.0
Independent	Nicușor Dan	6,168,642	53.60
AUR	George Simion	5,339,053	46.40
Total votes		11,641,866	100.0

== Notes ==
Party political offices
Position established	Leader of the Save Romania Union; 2016–2017	Succeeded by Dan Barna
Political offices
Preceded by Gabriela Firea	Mayor of Bucharest; 2020–2025	Succeeded by Stelian Bujduveanu; Acting
Preceded by Ilie Bolojan; Acting	President of Romania; 2025–present	Incumbent
