= 2016 Romanian local elections =

Local elections that were held in Romania on 5 June 2016

Local elections were held in Romania on 5 June 2016.

Using a first past the post system, the following were contested:

- All the commune, town, and city councils (Local Councils, Romanian: Consilii Locale), and the Sectors Local Councils of Bucharest (Romanian: Consilii Locale de Sector);
- The 41 County Councils (Romanian: Consilii Județene), and the Bucharest Municipal General Council (Romanian: Consiliul General Al Municipiului București). The 41 Presidents of the County Councils (Romanian: Președinții Consiliilor Județene) will be indirectly elected by the County Councilors;
- All the mayors (Romanian: Primarii);
  - Of the communes, cities, and municipalities;
  - Of the Sectors of Bucharest (Romanian: Primarii de Sector);
  - The General Mayor of The Municipality of Bucharest (Romanian: Primarul General al Municipiului București).

== Results ==
Summary of the 5 June 2016 Romanian local election results
Party	Mayor of Bucharest (PMB)			Mayors (P)			Local Councils seats (CL)			County Councils seats (CJ)		
Party	Votes	%	Seats	Votes	%	Seats	Votes	%	Seats	Votes	%	Seats
Social Democratic Party (Note: PSD, ALDE, and UNPR ran independently or in various electoral coalitions with each other (PSD-ALDE or PSD-UNPR).) (Romanian: Partidul Social Democrat - PSD)	246,553	42.97%	1	3,330,213	38.98%	1,708	3,161,046	37.70%	16,969	3,270,909	39.60%	638
National Liberal Party (Note: PNL ran mostly by itself, with the exception of Tătărăștii de Jos, where it ran in a coalition with the Christian Democratic National Peasants' Party (PNȚCD).) (Romanian: Partidul Național Liberal - PNL)	64,186	11.18%	-	2,686,099	31.50%	1,081	2,478,549	29.60%	13,198	2,529,986	30.64%	504
Alliance of Liberals and Democrats (Romanian: Alianța Liberalilor și Democraților - ALDE)	17,455	3.04%	-	488,145	5.72%	64	545,767	6.52%	2,504	521,845	6.32%	80
Democratic Alliance of Hungarians in Romania (Hungarian: Romániai Magyar Demokrata Szövetség; Romanian: Uniunea Democrată Maghiară din România - RMDSZ/UDMR)	-	-	-	315,236	3.69%	195	390,321	4.66%	2,284	411,823	4.98%	95
People's Movement Party (Romanian: Partidul Mișcarea Populară - PMP)	37,098	6.46%	-	304,924	3.57%	18	360,035	4.30%	1,315	368,985	4.46%	41
National Union for the Progress of Romania (Romanian: Uniunea Națională pentru Progresul României - UNPR)	-	-	-	213,233	2.50%	26	245,633	2.93%	1,203	220,467	2.67%	14
Save Bucharest Union (Romanian: Uniunea Salvaţi Bucureştiul - USB)	175,119	30.52%	-	96,789	1.13%	-	121,099	1.44%	39	143,544	1.73%	15
Romanian Social Party (Romanian: Partidul Social Românesc - PSRO)	-	-	-	100,303	1.17%	4	102,839	1.22%	318	99,587	1.20%	7
Ecologist Party of Romania (Romanian: Partidul Ecologist Român - PER)	-	-	-	63,246	0.74%	1	87,016	1.03%	210	98,486	1.19%	8
United Romania Party (Romanian: Partidul România Unită - PRU)	8,356	1.45%	-	51,200	0.60%	2	60,494	0.17%	169	66,131	0.80%	-
Independents	10,639	1.85%	-	486,826	5.71%	53	258,538	3.08%	316	52,800	0.63%	3
Democratic Forum of Germans in Romania (German: Demokratisches Forum der Deutschen in Rumänien; Romanian: Forumul Democrat al Germanilor din România - DFDR/FDGR)	-	-	-	40,348	0.47%	5	40,599	0.48%	81	42,652	0.51%	10
Hungarian People's Party of Transylvania (Hungarian: Erdélyi Magyar Néppárt; Romanian: Partidul Popular Maghiar din Transilvania - EMNP/PPMT)	-	-	-	21,171	0.24%	-	35,019	0.41%	207	38,215	0.46%	6
Coalition for Baia Mare (FDGR-PNȚCD-PSRO-UNPR) (Romanian: Coaliția pentru Baia Mare - CBM)	-	-	-	32,111	0.37%	1	20,229	0.24%	11	26,217	0.31%	5
Hungarian Civic Party (Hungarian: Magyar Polgári Párt; Romanian: Partidul Civic Maghiar - MPP/PCM)	-	-	-	19,355	0.22%	13	18,993	0.22%	158	16,824	0.20%	6
Party for Argeș and Muscel (Romanian: Partidul pentru Argeș and Muscel)	-	-	-	14,625	0.17%	-	15,049	0.17%	67	14,137	0.17%	2
Other political parties	14,369	2.48%	-	213,522	2.28%	15	368,927	4.63%	1,015	275,054	3.24%	-
Total:	573,775	100	1	8,477,346	100	3,186	8,310,153	100	40,067	8,197,662	100	1,434

== Electoral maps ==
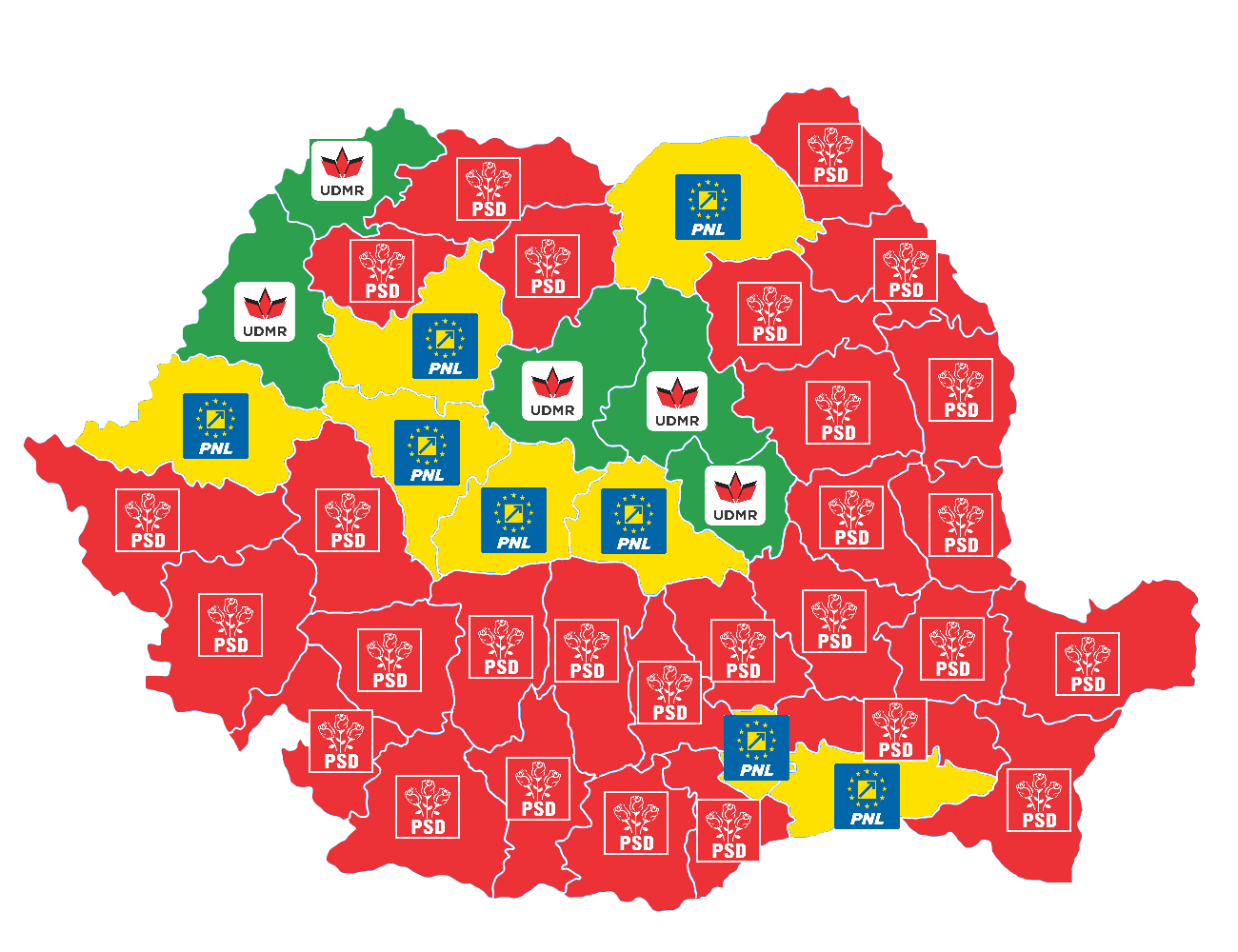
Political map depicting counties according to the county president's party affiliation

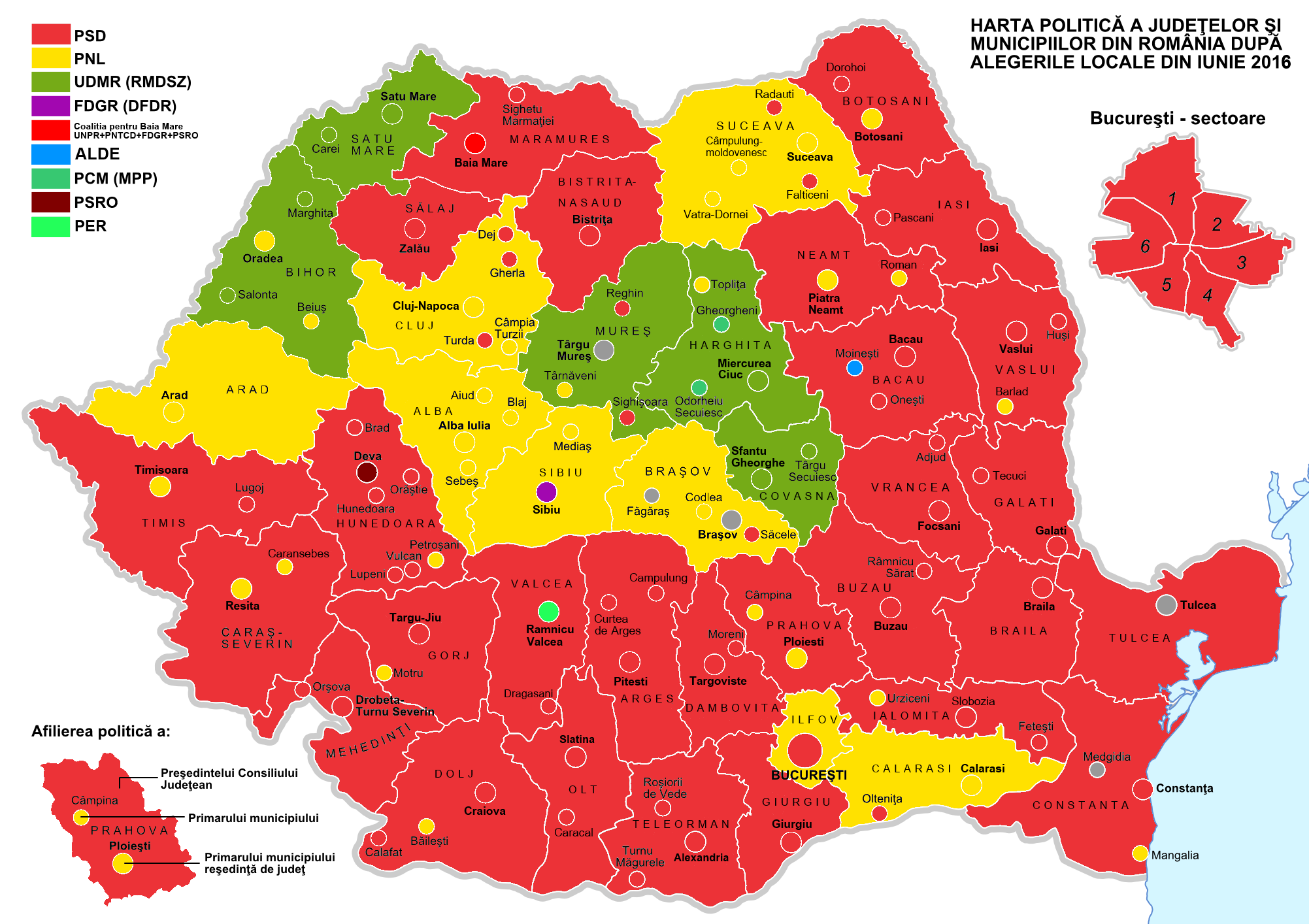
Political map based on the mayor's party affiliation (denoting only major Romanian cities and towns)

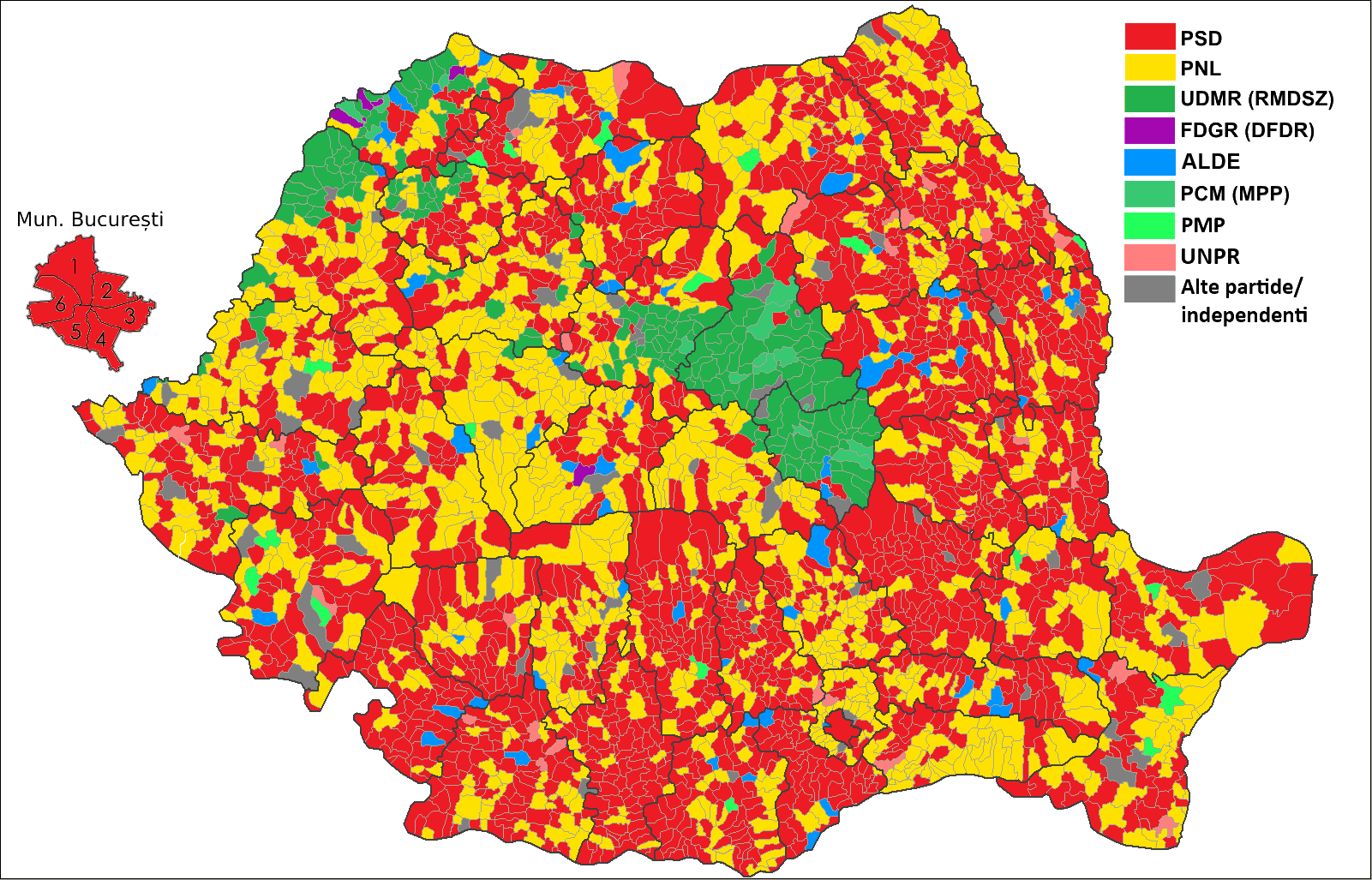
Political map depicting the localities won by political party
