= 2021 Romanian political crisis =

Political crisis in Romania between government coalition partners

- Date: 1 September 2021 – 25 November 2021 (2 months, 3 weeks and 3 days)
- Location: Romania
- Caused by: Disagreements by USR PLUS over the so-called Anghel Saligny investment program; Sacking of Justice Minister Stelian Ion by Prime Minister Florin Cîțu
- Result: Withdrawal of USR PLUS from the Cîțu Cabinet; Ludovic Orban losing PNL presidency to Florin Cîțu; Dissolution of the Cîțu Cabinet through a motion of no confidence; Orban's resignation as Chamber president; Two failed successive government proposals; Firing of Anca Dragu as Senate president; Installation of a new PSD-PNL-UDMR government under the leadership of general Nicolae Ciucă; Formation of the PNL splinter Force of the Right

Parties
(Romania) Executive Power: President; Government; National Coalition for Romania (CNR); National Liberal Party (PNL); Democratic Alliance of Hungarians in Romania (UDMR); Social Democratic Party (PSD) (since November 2021); Supported by: Ethnic minority parties	(Romania) Legislative Power: Parliament; Chamber of Deputies; Senate; Save Romania Union (USR) (formerly USR PLUS); Force of the Right (FD) (formerly PNL Orban wing); Alliance for the Union of Romanians (AUR); Romanian Nationhood Party (PNR); Social Democratic Party (PSD) (until November 2021); Humanist Power Party (PPU-SL); Supported by: People's Movement Party (PMP); Alliance for the Homeland (APP); Christian Democratic National Peasants' Party (PNȚ-CD); PRO Romania (PRO)

Lead figures
Klaus Iohannis; Florin Cîțu (PM until November 2021); Nicolae Ciucă (PM since November 2021); Kelemen Hunor; Marcel Ciolacu (since November 2021) See full list: PNL & UDMR Ministers; Lucian Bode; Raluca Turcan; Dan Vîlceanu; Sorin Cîmpeanu; Virgil-Daniel Popescu; Bogdan Gheorghiu; Cătălin Predoiu; Florin Roman; Constantin Cadariu; Tánczos Barna; Cseke Attila; Eduard Novak PSD Ministers (since November 2021); Adrian Câciu; Vasile Dîncu; Sorin Grindeanu; Marius Budăi; Gabriela Firea; Lucian Romașcanu; Florin Spătaru; Alexandru Rafila; Adrian Chesnoiu; Marian Neacșu (PRO Romania) Alina Gorghiu; Rareș Bogdan; Daniel Fenechiu; Robert Sighiartău; Emil Boc; Gheorghe Flutur; Monica Anisie; Nelu Tătaru; Gheorghe Falcă; Iulian Dumitrescu; Alin Nica; Vergil Chițac; Daniel Constantin; Ciprian Ciucu; Sebastian Burduja; Alexandru Muraru; Hubert Thuma; Gabriel Andronache; Csoma Botond; Lóránd Turos; Ödön Szabó; Csilla Hegedüs; László Attila; Supported by: Varujan Pambuccian; Cristian Popescu Piedone	Ludovic Orban; Anca Dragu Dacian Cioloș; Dan Barna See full list: USR Ministers; Stelian Ion; Ioana Mihăilă; Vlad Voiculescu; Cătălin Drulă; Cristian Ghinea; Claudiu Năsui; Ciprian Teleman Ionuț Moșteanu; Radu Mihail; Octavian Berceanu; Clotilde Armand; Dominic Fritz; Allen Coliban; Emanuel Ungureanu; Cosette Chichirău; Iulian Bulai; Adrian Veștea; Virgil Guran; Violeta Alexandru; Alexandru Nazare; Adrian Oros; Ionel Dancă; Stelian Tănase; Marius Oprea; Nicolae Manolescu; Doru Braia; Dan Grigore; Dinu Zamfirescu; George Simion; Claudiu Târziu; Sorin Lavric; Dan Tanasă Until November 2021: Marcel Ciolacu; Sorin Grindeanu; Lucian Romașcanu; Alexandru Rafila; Adrian Streinu-Cercel; Gabriela Firea; Mihai Tudose; Paul Stănescu; Vasile Dîncu; Daniel Ionașcu; Grațiela Gavrilescu; Maria Grapini; Ramona Ioana Bruynseels Supported by: Nicușor Dan; Diana Iovanovici-Șoșoacă; Călin Georgescu; Cristian Diaconescu; Traian Băsescu; Mihail Neamțu; Codrin Ștefănescu; Liviu Dragnea; Aurelian Pavelescu; Cristian Terheș; Victor Ponta

A political crisis began on 1 September 2021 in Romania, engulfing both major coalition partners of the Cîțu Cabinet, namely the conservative-liberal National Liberal Party (PNL) and the progressive-liberal Save Romania Union (USR). The crisis also involved former prime minister Ludovic Orban (PNL), who was set to face Prime Minister Florin Cîțu (PNL) in a leadership election during the party congress on 25 September, with the latter eventually replacing the former. Orban would eventually resign from his position as President of the Chamber of Deputies, with him and his supporters subsequently splitting from the PNL, in order to form the Force of the Right (FD).

The crisis was sparked by disagreements over the so-called Anghel Saligny investment program meant to develop Romanian settlements, which was supported by Prime Minister Cîțu but was severely criticized by USR PLUS, whose ministers boycotted a government meeting. In response, Prime Minister Cîțu sacked Justice Minister Stelian Ion (USR) and named Interior Minister Lucian Bode (PNL) as interim, igniting a crisis. In retaliation, USR PLUS submitted a motion of no confidence (also known as a motion of censure) against the Cîțu Cabinet together with the nationalist opposition party Alliance for the Unity of Romanians (AUR) and by 7 September, all USR PLUS ministers resigned on their own. The following day, Prime Minister Cîțu fired all secretaries of state and prefects named in their respective positions by USR PLUS.

The PNL leadership election caused the debate on the motion of no confidence to be postponed until after the congress, following a complaint to the Constitutional Court of Romania submitted by Cîțu. Subsequently, the major opposition Social Democratic Party (PSD), the largest political force in the Parliament, submitted a second motion of no confidence, which was read on 30 September 2021 and by which the Cîțu Cabinet was dissolved on 5 October 2021. Subsequently, President Klaus Iohannis designated Dacian Cioloș of USR as prime minister, followed by Nicolae Ciucă of PNL, however the proposal for the former was rejected by the Parliament and the latter stepped back. Throughout most of November 2021, negotiations between PSD, PNL and UDMR for a new majority took place, after which Ciucă was designated again by Iohannis as prime minister on 22 November. The crisis finally ended on 25 November, after the Ciucă Cabinet took office.

All throughout this period of time, the political crisis had a somewhat severe impact on the economy, as well as public health, both having been already affected by the global COVID-19 pandemic.

== Background ==
In December 2020, legislative elections were held, in which the governing party (PNL) performed poorly, positioning second after the PSD, the main opposition party at that time. As a result of the PNL's defeat, then-Prime Minister Ludovic Orban announced his resignation as PM. Nicolae Ciucă, then-Minister of Defence, became acting head of government until the formation of a new cabinet.

Subsequently, Orban announced that Florin Cîțu is the PNL's proposal for prime minister. A multi-party coalition (PNL–USR–PLUS–UDMR/RMDSZ) was formed to govern Romania after the 2020 legislative elections, with Dan Barna (USR) and Hunor Kelemen (UDMR) becoming Deputy Prime Ministers. Out of the 21 ministers of Florin Cîțu's cabinet, USR PLUS had 7 ministers, while PNL and UDMR/RMDSZ combined had 13 ministries. The only ministerial position to be occupied by an independent was that of Foreign Affairs, where Bogdan Aurescu remained minister.

The first and second PNDLs (Note: "PNDL" stands for Programul Național de Dezvoltare Locală (English: National Program for Local Development).) were started by the governments of the Liviu Dragnea-led PSD, and as of August 2021, had still not been fully implemented. Nonetheless, the government was considering implementing the so-called Anghel Saligny national investment program, also known as "PNDL 3" due to its similarity with the first and second PNDLs. USR PLUS positioned itself in opposition of a PNDL-like program, on the grounds that "it would give the opportunity to allocate funds to local barons".

== Timeline ==
=== Beginning of the crisis ===
A government meeting was scheduled for 1 September 2021 to approve the "Anghel Saligny investment program". It was boycotted by USR PLUS on the grounds that it lacked transparency and the funds could be misused, with a press release stating "USR PLUS supports the development of the rural localities in Romania, but not through programmes that encourage the waste of public money on political grounds. The money from the former National Programs for Local Development from the PSD time reached the pockets of the local barons. We refuse to be part of replicating this practice of discretionary fund allotments to the party client bases and of bad investments that led to nowhere in the real development of the rural areas". In response, Prime Minister Cîțu sacked Justice Minister Stelian Ion (USR) and named Interior Minister Lucian Bode (PNL) as interim, stating that "I will not accept ministers in the Romanian government who oppose the modernisation of Romania. Blocking the activity of the government only because you do not agree to develop the communities means violating the mandate given to you by parliament through the governing programme". A coalition meeting took place afterwards, but no consensus was made. Bode stated that Saligny would be approved in his interim mandate, emphasizing that his ministry is pronouncing on the project's legality rather than opportunity.

At that time, the main opposition party, the Social Democratic Party (PSD) was already planning a motion of no confidence (or motion of censure) aimed to the government led by Cîțu, which would be submitted only after attracting at least 234 parliamentarians that were against the government (as required per Article 113 of the Constitution), after its first attempt from June 2021 to dissolve the government failed with 201 votes "for" and 1 "against". Sorin Grindeanu stated that "whoever wants this government to fall will sign no other motion than that of PSD", entitled "Stop poverty, price increases and criminals! Down with the Cîțu Government!".

On 2 September 2021, Rareș Bogdan announced that the National Permanent Bureau of the National Liberal Party (PNL) unanimously voted for the continued support of Cîțu as prime minister.

=== USR–AUR no-confidence motion ===
After lifting confidence on Cîțu, USR PLUS announced on 3 September 2021 that it lodged its own motion of no confidence against the government together with the opposition party Alliance for the Unity of Romanians (AUR), entitled "The firing of the Cîțu Government, the only chance for Romania to live!", which parliamentarians of the PSD would vote. Prime Minister Cîțu asked for the honorary resignation of all USR PLUS ministers, stating that it would get in touch with the leaders of the European Union and the United States on their party of origin's "toxic" alliance with the AUR working against the will of the Romanians. Nonetheless, the Anghel Saligny investment program was approved in the absence of USR PLUS ministers. USR PLUS would shortly afterwards criticize the approving, referring to it as a "brand new OUG 13 abuse".

On 4 September, President Klaus Iohannis called USR PLUS' alleged anti-governmental alliance with AUR an "affront" brought to the Romanians who at the 2020 Romanian legislative elections decided the direction Romania should go, and asked USR PLUS on his behalf "to weigh very well the implications of the association with the objectives promoted by AUR and to return to the table of dialogue with the rest of the governing coalition to find a solution for unblocking the governmental situation". At another press release during a visit to Switzerland, he did not consider the "governmental thingy" worrying. Dacian Cioloș stated that his party doesn't and will not have a political project with AUR.

=== Breakup in the governing coalition ===
The co-presidents of USR PLUS, Dan Barna and Dacian Cioloș announced on 6 September 2021, that all USR PLUS ministers will be resigning by 7 September from their positions. In response, Prime Minister Cîțu fired all secretaries of state, prefects and subprefects appointed by USR PLUS, Thus, the Cîțu Cabinet effectively became a PNL-UDMR minority government.

USR PLUS compared Prime Minister Cîțu to Liviu Dragnea, former president of the Social Democratic Party (PSD), accusing Cîțu of ousting secretaries of state "for no reason other than to appoint his own people that serve his interests, and of buying votes in his party with the money of the Romanians through the 'Anghel Saligny' program".

In a press conference on 7 September, the first vice-president of the PSD, Sorin Grindeanu, declared that the motion of no confidence submitted by USR PLUS and AUR "is an insult and says nothing but that the Prime Minister did not follow the protocol", calling the party's ministers' resignations "a proof of hypocrisy". In the meantime, Dacian Cioloș proposed that the three-party coalition government continue with a prime minister appointed by his party, USR PLUS, which was considered "frivolous" by Cîțu, who appreciated that the National Liberal Party "is and will be the biggest right-wing party in Romania and that it can't be imposed a Prime Minister by any other party". Cioloș confirmed his position on 29 September.

=== Defense attempts by the prime minister ===
On 8 September 2021, Prime Minister Cîțu complained to the Constitutional Court of violation of constitutional provisions by the Parliament regarding the manner in which it was initiated and submitted and the way it was communicated to the government, despite previously accusing President of the Chamber of Deputies Ludovic Orban of "accelerating the process of dissolving the government".

The PSD voted in the reunited permanent bureaus for postponing the day the motion of no confidence submitted by USR PLUS and AUR is voted in the Parliament, along with the remaining member parties of the coalition government and the minorities, until the Constitutional Court pronounces. Ludovic Orban did not vote, subsequently accusing violation of the rule of law and calling the final results of the vote "unconstitutional". The day of 15 September 2021 was assigned by the Constitutional Court as the deadline until the Parliament and the government have to convey their points of view.

Ciolacu justified the PSD's move around the fact his party respects the Constitution and the laws of the country and that it is normal to wait until the court pronounces on Prime Minister Cîțu's complaint on the matter.

It had been rumoured that the PNL wanted for the motion of no confidence not to be voted in Parliament until after its congress, as Prime Minister Cîțu was a candidate for the presidency of the party alongside Orban, and as such wanted the former to retain his position in order for his chances to defeat the latter remain high. Prime Minister Cîțu stated it will ask for the firing of Orban and Dragu as presidents of the chamber of deputies and of the Senate respectively if his government will be given justice.

=== Parliament scandals ===
For the reunited plenary session of the Romanian Parliament on 9 September 2021 at 16:00 EEST for reading the motion of no confidence submitted by USR PLUS and AUR on 3 September 2021, President of the Chamber of Deputies Ludovic Orban delegated his duties to the vice-president, Florin Roman (PNL), to allow him to focus on his campaign for the presidency of the National Liberal Party (PNL).

Ionuț Moșteanu (USR PLUS) said that in absence of the president of the Chamber of Deputies, the session should be led by the President of the Senate Anca Dragu instead. This led to scandal in the Chamber of Deputies, with Roman forcibly departed from the microphone and replaced with Dragu. Furthermore, the co-president of the AUR George Simion accused Alina Gorghiu for "violating the Constitution", while she accused Simion for his own actions.

As of result, Florin Roman stated he will file a penal complaint, accusing the alleged USR PLUS–AUR alliance of blocking him by force, hooliganism, insults and physical aggression to exercise his duties. He also solicited the ousting of the president of the Senate. The next day, Prime Minister Florin Cîțu called for everyone from USR PLUS "who still feel pro-European and want democracy in Romania" to renounce the actions of their leaders in Parliament from the previous day, adding that Romania is still in a pandemic, and asked for "the institutions of the state" to fine the AUR parliamentarians present the previous day for violating measures aimed at stopping the spread of the coronavirus in an indoor area.

On 11 September 2021, Ludovic Orban criticized Prime Minister Cîțu after he posted himself on Instagram as "Superman", claiming that "he needs help". Furthermore, the next day he said that people are reproaching politicians in power (including President Klaus Iohannis) that they triggered the political crisis instead of governing Romania, adding that he will take action to end the crisis in the "shortest possible time" if chosen president of the PNL. Rareș Bogdan, the First Vice-president of the PNL declared that USR PLUS would be given only few governmental positions if they were to return to the government, claiming that "they must pay in this way for the irresponsibility of leaving the act of government while the country is going through moments of balance". Stelian Ion and Vlad Voiculescu would not be accepted by PNL in the government again.

On 13 September 2021, the vice-president of the Senate Alina Gorghiu requested a new meeting of the Reunited Permanent Bureaus to determine whether the President of the Senate Anca Dragu violated the Regulation during the reunited plenary session of the Parliament when Florin Roman was forcibly departed from the microphone, also soliciting sanctions for the AUR.

=== Conflict of constitutional nature ===
On 14 September 2021, Ionuț Moșteanu announced that USR PLUS deputies had sent letters to Ludovic Orban and Anca Dragu, requesting the convening of a joint plenary to debate the motion of no confidence "The firing of the Cîțu Government, the only chance for Romania to live!", while AUR deputies demanded its voting by protesting. Regardless, the Permanent Bureau of the Senate began to side with Prime Minister Florin Cîțu and his government, stating that the motion of no confidence was initiated and submitted "violating the constitutional provisions of Article 113 of the Constitution of Romania" and consequently it asks the Constitutional Court "to ascertain the existence of a legal conflict of a constitutional nature between the Parliament and the Government", point of view that was transmitted to the Chamber of Deputies also.

On 15 September 2021, the Constitutional Court decided that it won't rule on the motion of no confidence until after the National Liberal Party's congress, more precisely on 28 September. Anca Dragu accused Cîțu of blocking the activity of the Parliament and asked him to come with proposals for new ministers on all ministerial positions that belonged to USR PLUS before the political crisis began. Orban cataloged the postponing of the vote for the motion of no confidence a ridiculous decision, adding that President Klaus Iohannis can get Romania out of the political crisis with a "15 minute head-to-head". Cîțu stated in a press conference on the same day that by Dragu's approach, she "wants to remove USR PLUS [whose ministers already resigned 8 days earlier and other people appointed by the party already ousted 7 days earlier] from the government".

In the meantime, President Klaus Iohannis visited a golf field at Pianu de Jos, after which he stated in a press release: "I am glad to meet here so many people passionate about golf ... Golf can be practiced at any age and I encourage as many as possible to discover this beautiful sport that offers many satisfactions", which was no exception to waves of irony. In reaction, the social-democrats (PSD) practiced golf near Romexpo (where the PNL congress took place) while a senator from the same party came in the Parliament with a hoe (as a mock to Iohannis). However, Ciolacu's criticism did not hesitate to occur.

=== AUR's parliamentary strike ===
In protest for the continued postponing of the voting of the motion of no confidence in the Parliament, the AUR decided to enter parliamentary strike indefinitely starting 20 September 2021. The party would still be present in plenary sessions but would refuse to vote as long as the motion of no confidence is not debated and voted, in an attempt to draw attention in the Parliament of the situation.

On 21 September 2021, Dan Barna stated for the news television station Digi24 that USR PLUS would begin a dialogue on a possible reestablishment of the three-party coalition government soon after PNL's congress "with the [candidate for] president of the PNL Florin Cîțu, but not also with Prime Minister Florin Cîțu".

On 22 September 2021, President Klaus Iohannis announced that he would attend the congress of the National Liberal Party scheduled for 25 September, effectively violating Article 84 of the Constitution. The same amount of c. 5,000 delegates participating remained unchanged despite a surge in COVID-19 pandemic numbers with 7,045 cases and 130 deaths reported on 22 September 2021, compared to the 1,443 cases and 21 deaths reported on 1 September 2021 (the day the political crisis began), USR PLUS accused the Prime Minister of buying delegate votes on the congress, claiming that he "proves that he has no scruples and is only interested in winning the [PNL's] congress using in this sense the public resources and the position [of Prime Minister] he temporarily holds".

On 24 September 2021, the PSD notified the Police, Gendarmerie and the IGSU on the organization of PNL's congress (with 5,000 delegates physically present in an indoor area), accusing the party of falsifying such a meeting by associating it with an "artistic production" and "cultural activity" in an effort to defy the restrictions on large gatherings set due to the fourth wave of the COVID-19 pandemic.

=== 2021 National Liberal Party congress ===
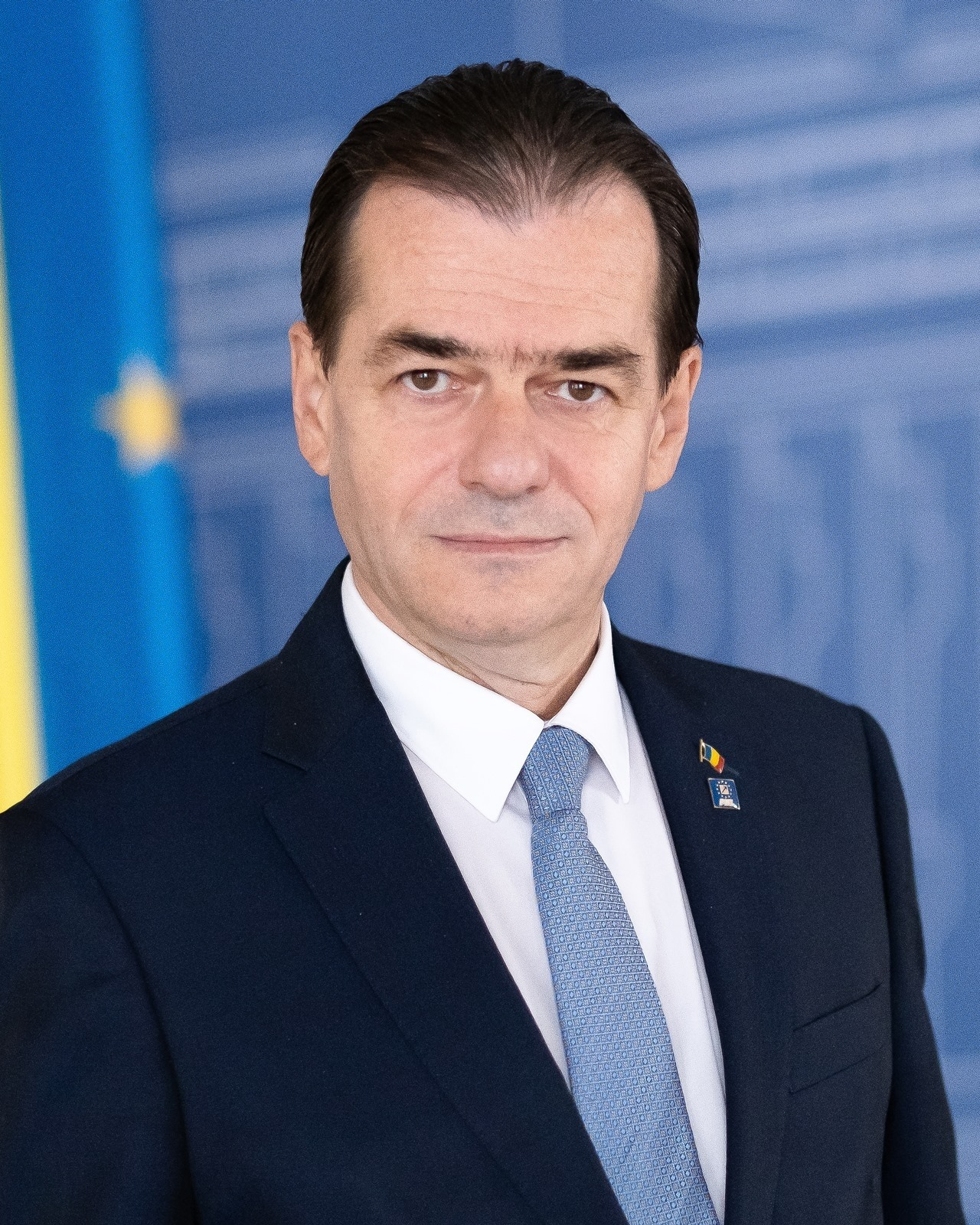
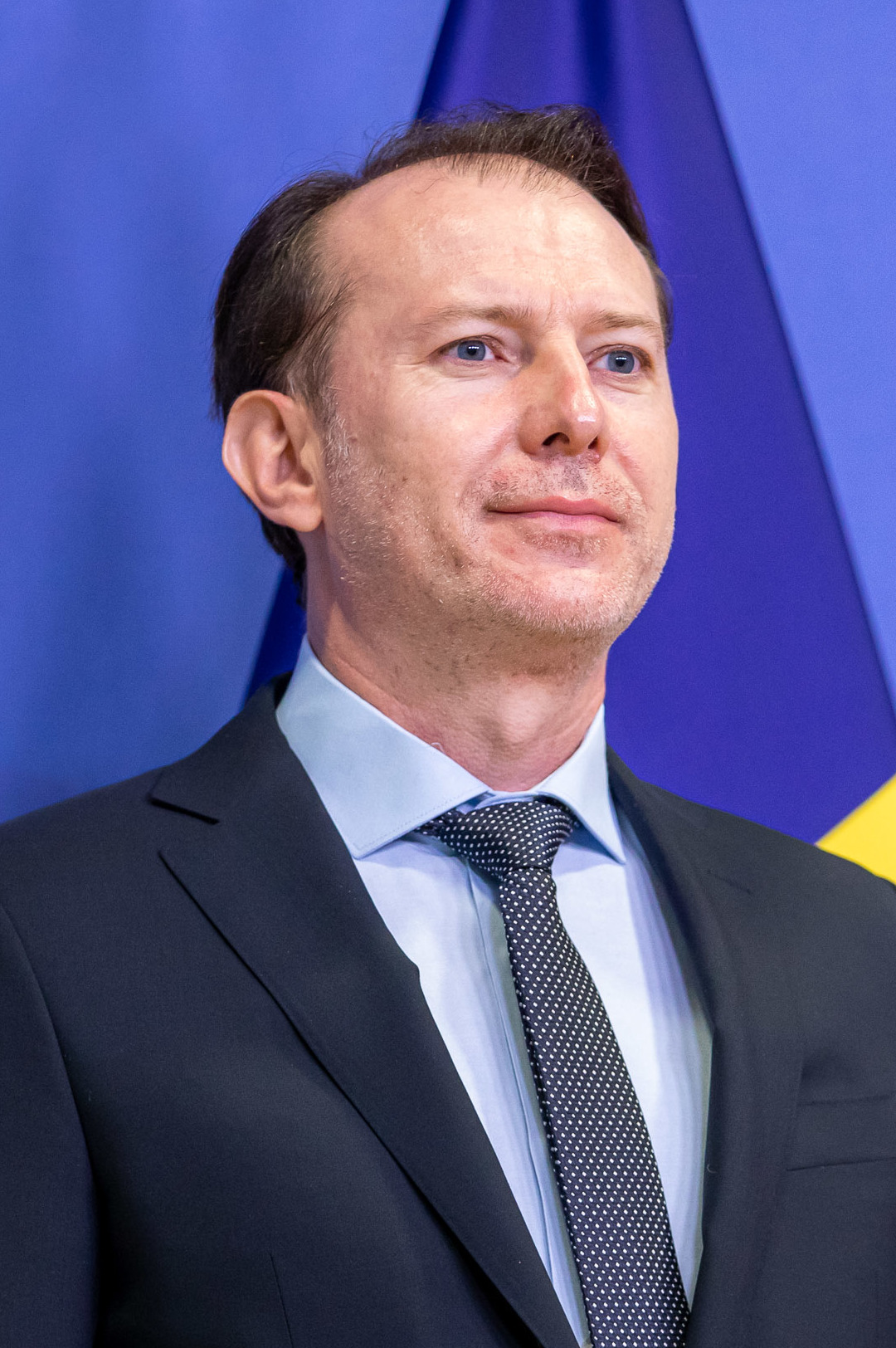
Previous president of PNL Ludovic Orban (left) lost to incumbent Prime Minister Florin Vasile Cîțu (right) in an internal presidential election at the PNL congress held on 25 September 2021.

Despite the criticism of the organization of the congress amid the fourth wave of the COVID-19 pandemic that was hitting Romania at that time, the National Liberal Party (PNL) had gone forward with its congress as set to take place on 25 September 2021, with the same amount of c. 5,000 planned delegates physically present at Romexpo in Bucharest. Prime Minister Cîțu was a candidate for the presidency of the party with the motion "Liberal Romania" (Romanian: România liberală), alongside the incumbent President of PNL Ludovic Orban who chose the name "Right's Force" (Romanian: Forța Dreptei) for his own motion. Apart from President Iohannis, who attended the congress as announced on 22 September, Deputy Prime Minister Hunor Kelemen, president of the UDMR, was also present.

Prime Minister Cîțu, supported also by former leaders of the Democratic Liberal Party, won the presidency of the PNL with 60.2% of votes, defeating Orban (who got only 39.7%). Orban congratulated Cîțu for his election to the presidency of the PNL and announced his intention to resign from his position as President of the Chamber of Deputies the next week, officially ending his partnership with President Klaus Iohannis. Subsequently, Cîțu announced that a new PNL leadership team will be voted the next day, which will have the aim of addressing the decrease in opinion polls of what is now his party so as to win all the elections in 2024. On 26 September 2021, the party's leadership team under Prime Minister Cîțu has been voted, validated, and consequently established.

On 27 September 2021, the former leader of the National Liberal Party Ludovic Orban submitted his resignation as President of the Chamber of Deputies to the President-elect of the PNL Florin Cîțu (thus not to the secretariat of the Chamber). He also accused President Iohannis for his involvement in the congress of a political party (apologizing to the Romanians for asking them to vote for Iohannis in the 2019 Romanian presidential election) and Cîțu's supporters of orchestrating a "party coup", impeding freedom of choice and controlling the vote of the delegates at the congress as an attack against democracy.

PNL was fined 10.000 lei for the way its congress was organized. On 28 September 2021, Adrian Oros (PNL) resigned as Minister of Agriculture, claiming that Prime Minister Cîțu put agriculture and food industry in the last place, with no major project on both being attached to Romania's Planul Național de Redresare și Reziliență (PNRR) approved the previous day by the European Commission.

=== Aftermath of the PNL congress ===
On 28 September 2021, the Constitutional Court admitted Cîțu's complaint and consequently recognized the conflict between the Parliament and the Government, but asked for the USR PLUS-AUR motion of no confidence to be debated and voted in the Parliament as soon as possible. In the meantime, the Social Democratic Party (PSD) announced that it submitted its own motion of no confidence against the Cîțu cabinet, entitled "STOP poverty, price increases and criminals! Down with the Cîțu Government!". USR PLUS and the Alliance for the Union of Romanians (AUR) announced they'll vote the first motion of no confidence they'll get the chance to in the Parliament.

On 30 September 2021, the PSD motion of no confidence was read in the Parliament at a reunited plenary session in the Chamber of Deputies. The text of the motion of no confidence that was read differed from the original text.

On 1 October 2021, Dacian Cioloș (representing PLUS) was elected as the sole President of USR PLUS. These results would be validated in a congress of the party that would take place on 2 and 3 October 2021 respectively at Romexpo in Bucharest. The party guaranteed that it will opt for caution amid the sanitary crisis provoked by the COVID-19 pandemic when organizing its congress (over 12,500 infection cases have been reported on 2 October). Furthermore, the 24 members of the National Political Bureau of USR PLUS have been elected, and the party's name reverted to Save Romania Union (USR).

Meanwhile, Ludovic Orban criticized President Iohannis again, stating: 'How could you [Iohannis] support for the presidency of the PNL a candidate that won't be Prime Minister [Cîțu] who fringed PNL, destroyed the coalition, has no prospects, has a 10% confidence share', comparing his government to that of Dăncilă (PSD) which had a 20% confidence share. He mentioned that the sacking of Justice Minister Stelian Ion wouldn't be possible without Iohannis' agreement. Regarding the scenario where the government is dissolved and the President nominates Cîțu for the second time, he stated: 'That would be the utmost courage to come with Florin Cîțu [as nomination for Prime Minister]'.

=== Dissolution of the Cîțu Cabinet ===
On 5 October 2021, the Parliament organized a reunited plenary session to debate and vote the "STOP poverty, price increases and criminals! Down with the Cîțu Government!" motion of no confidence filed by the PSD. 281 parliamentarians have voted "for" the motion of no confidence, more than the 234 necessary (in fact the largest number of votes since the Romanian Revolution), and consequently the Cîțu Cabinet was dissolved.

In response, President Klaus Iohannis stated during a press release: "Sad but true. The word that best characterizes today's Romania is the word crisis. We are in public health crisis ... We are in a crisis of energy prices, a crisis that is both European and global ... But what did some of our politicians think? To add another crisis: a governmental crisis ... We must find a solution, Romania must be governed. The pandemic, the electricity price crisis, winter is coming, all this must be solved by someone. This someone, obviously, is the Romanian government". His announcement not to convene consultations with political parties until "next week" to give political parties time to "find mature approaches" sparked some controversy, the decision receiving criticism from the USR as well. Iohannis was going to leave for a meeting of the Council of the European Union in Slovenia before postponing his visit due to the adoption of the motion of no confidence, until later the same day.

In a further press release the next day, Iohannis stated: "I think it takes good days for everyone to get down to earth ... Politicians have come to have anti-all statements. Everyone is against everyone. It's not possible this way ... I thought it would take a few days for this unmotivated enthusiasm [in connection with the fall of the Cîțu Cabinet] to fade a little. People end up asking their question now and start serious, mature discussions, because otherwise the problems will become more worrying".

On 7 October 2021, the president of the PSD Marcel Ciolacu announced that he will file a penal complaint against Florin Cîțu for abuse of office after his interim government had withdrawn 1 billion lei from the Reserve Fund to allocate it to town halls and county councils, affirming: "Iohannis and Cîțu decided that if you do not live in a community led by a [national] liberal, you will suffer from cold, poverty and hunger! They allocated 80% of the money for the local administration to localities with PNL and UDMR mayors". In the meantime, Iohannis organized a press conference where when asked by journalists about the sacking of Justice Minister Stelian Ion, he said that Ion was "fired because he did nothing". Stelian Ion reacted: "They [Iohannis] should take a few words out of their vocabulary these days: cynicism, pride, greed".

=== Second Cioloș Cabinet failure ===
On 11 October 2021, President Klaus Iohannis convened consultations with all political parties represented in the Parliament, at the Cotroceni Palace. The outcomes are as follows:

- National Liberal Party (PNL): Due to a lack of majority in the Parliament, the party did not nominalize a prime minister during the consultations.
- Social Democratic Party (PSD): The party did not come with a prime minister proposal in the consultations either. Marcel Ciolacu continued to oppose a minority government.
- Save Romania Union (USR): Dacian Cioloș confirmed that USR is ready to return to the government together with PNL and UDMR provided Cîțu is not prime minister. He stated that his party would come with a prime minister proposal (either him, Ghinea or Drulă) if PNL's "only candidate" for the position of head of government remains Cîțu.
- Alliance for the Unity of Romanians (AUR): Co-president of the party George Simion declared that his party told Iohannis to ask for the dismissal of Cîțu as ad interim prime minister and proposed a technocratic government with Călin Georgescu as prime minister.
- Democratic Alliance of Hungarians in Romania (UDMR/RMDSZ): The party offered itself to lead the Government of Romania for a period of at least 6 months. Its Prime Minister proposal is Hunor Kelemen.

The president of the USR Dacian Cioloș was designated as prime minister by the President. Per Article 103 of the Constitution, Cioloș had 10 days to nominate a list of ministers and get the necessary 234 "for" votes for confidence to be granted by the Parliament. PNL announced that it will not vote for the cabinet, while AUR and PSD ruled out support. Nonetheless, Cioloș announced that he will start negotiations with PNL and UDMR for the cabinet.

In the meantime, since over 15 days have passed since Orban's submission of his resignation as President of the Chamber of Deputies to Florin Cîțu (on 27 September) without action being taken, he announced that he will submit his resignation directly to the secretariat of the Chamber, ending his term. Florin Roman became interim Chamber president.

No consensus was made over USR's negotiations with PNL, UDMR and minority parties from 13 October 2021. While the party continued to deny any speculation that it ever allied with PSD and AUR, the president of the PNL Florin Cîțu continued to refer to the alleged majority in a speech on the same day: "We agreed on two things: the responsibility belongs to Mr. Cioloș, the second responsibility belongs to the [alleged] AUR-PSD-USR coalition from which Mr. Cioloș is appointed. For other discussions I will have to go to the National Liberal Party".

On 15 October 2021, encouraged by President Klaus Iohannis, Cioloș restarted negotiations for finding parliamentary support. However, Cîțu stated that his party (PNL) voted against supporting the second Cioloș cabinet, continuing (together with Hunor Kelemen) to ask Cioloș to negotiate with PSD and AUR first. Cioloș called for PNL not to run away from responsibility and announced that he will come with a proposal of a monochromatic USR minority government in the Parliament. The cabinet hearings from 19 October ended with a mostly negative outcome. Although almost 19,000 COVID-19 cases and over 500 deaths were reported on that day, Cioloș accused the committees of the Parliament of "voting based on political faults and party logos".

On 20 October 2021, the Second Cioloș Cabinet failed to pass through Parliament on an 88–184 vote. PNL president Florin Cîțu acknowledged the need of forming a new government as soon as possible, but as long as it is "formed around the National Liberal Party". Orban requested the resignation of Cîțu as president of the party, claiming that he demonstrated that he has no trace of responsibility.

=== Minority government failure ===
Because the Second Cioloș Cabinet failed to pass through Parliament the previous day, President Klaus Iohannis convened new consultations at Cotroceni Palace on 21 October 2021. For the first time, the National Liberal Party (PNL) leadership acknowledged that there is no possibility of making a majority around the party's president, Florin Cîțu. Thus, the PNL's Prime Minister proposal was Nicolae Ciucă, who was nominated by the President as Prime Minister-designate.

Dan Barna announced that USR will oppose the Ciucă Cabinet. Ludovic Orban announced that he will not vote for the cabinet. UDMR is likely to support such a cabinet due to the exceptional situation in which Romania is found. In the meantime, Iohannis made a speech in Brussels where he called the USR "crizatori". In response, Ciprian Teleman (USR) mockingly defined the word in accordance with the President's criticism; officially that word doesn't exist in the Romanian dictionary. Until the UDMR changed its position, it was initially against a minority government.

The Social Democratic Party (PSD) also initially excluded support (even conditionally) of a PNL–UDMR minority government, but this became more likely over time. The first sign that there were negotiations between the two parties was when Vasile Dîncu (PSD) and Alina Gorghiu (PNL) traveled to Chișinău on the same plane. The leaders of PNL and PSD, Cîțu and Ciolacu eventually met at Vila Lac for negotiations, however they turned out to be a failure. On 25 October 2021, Prime Minister-designate Nicolae Ciucă met with PNL leader Florin Cîțu and President Klaus Iohannis from which it was speculated that he thereafter received a flexible mandate to negotiate a majority government, following another meeting with Dacian Cioloș whose party (USR) afterwards declared that it will support an eventual Ciucă Cabinet only in the form of a refreshed coalition, fact which was confirmed to be false by Cîțu. On 26 October 2021, Ciucă, on behalf of the PNL, sent an open letter to all parties in the Parliament in which he demanded support of a PNL–UDMR minority government; a ceasefire until after the winter of 2021-22 amid the COVID-19 pandemic fourth wave and energy crisis.

By 28 October 2021, Ludovic Orban and five parliamentarians who support him left the PNL parliamentary group in protest for the actions of the party's leadership under Florin Cîțu. Florin Roman compared the phenomenon with the case of Călin Popescu-Tăriceanu, who left PNL to form the Alliance of Liberals and Democrats (ALDE), and asked for the expelling of Orban and his supporters.

After Ciucă and Cîțu submitted to the Parliament the list of ministers in the cabinet and the governing program, Ciolacu announced that the PSD will not vote for the cabinet, because the party's 10 conditions for the matter were not implemented in the said program, with the cabinet instead proposing the reinstating of taxes for the Romanian diaspora, abolished by the PSD cabinets. In the meantime, Cîțu, with an approval rating of just 7%, resorted to buying Facebook likes from countries such as Vietnam, the post-Soviet states and from the Arab world.

On 1 November, Ciucă submitted his mandate as Prime Minister-designate. Consequently, this marked the failure of a second attempt for forming the successor to the Cîțu Cabinet in less than 60 days. Meanwhile, Sorin Grindeanu replaced Florin Roman as acting Chamber of Deputies president.

=== PSD–PNL–UDMR negotiations ===
On 4 November 2021, the leaders of the PNL and PSD respectively, Cîțu and Ciolacu met in the prospect of forming a government, in a third attempt, where the PSD told the PNL to get the position of prime minister and half of the ministers. A day prior, PNL convened negotiations with USR, after which Cîțu declared that "there are big chances [to remake the coalition]". In the meantime, former Labor Minister Violeta Alexandru left the PNL parliamentary group in support of Ludovic Orban, rising the total number of PNL parliamentarians taking this move to 17 by 3 November. President Iohannis stated in a press release that he will not convene new consultations until a majority is formed in the Parliament.

On 8 November 2021, the National Political Bureau (BPN) of the National Liberal Party voted "for" a PSD–PNL–UDMR coalition led by "a Prime Minister from the PNL", defying the initial statements against such government by both the PSD and PNL, the latter whose then-president Ludovic Orban didn't rule out the scenario of such government on 9 September. Florin Cîțu justified the move as follows: "Our former partners [the USR] shook hands with the PSD, [and] they didn't want to shake hands with us [the PNL] anymore". Subsequently, the USR announced official entry in opposition, with the party's president Dacian Cioloș criticizing the decision of the PNL. On 12 November 2021, the PNL expelled Orban at the proposal of the party's Secretary-General Dan Vîlceanu, a supporter of Florin Cîțu, consequently opening the door to a new political force.

The PNL's negotiations with the PSD quickly resulted in a deadlock. The PNL insisted to keep the office of prime minister to them, with Florin Cîțu himself willing to become prime minister, while the PSD wanted to take over the office instead. The rotation of the office between the two parties every a year and a half was also discussed, but both wanted to be first. Moreover, at a week after the decision of the PNL's BPN of 8 November, there was still a lack of consensus on some key aspects of the joint governing programme, particularly on Justice and Finance.

After the PNL showed its desire to obtain the Ministry of Development from UDMR (to which it belonged in the Cîțu Cabinet), the latter threatened with leaving the coalition. The PSD stated that they would also quit if the UDMR takes this move. On 21 November 2021, PNL's negotiations with the PSD and the UDMR have been finally closed with a positive outcome for the forming of a new government. Former PNL president Ludovic Orban spoke against the coalition, and announced that the political party he will form will position itself in opposition to the government, because "this [PSD-PNL-UDMR] coalition... represents a danger for democracy in Romania ... It will be hard to work with this monster. They will try to control all the televisions, [and] all the state institutions".

=== Formation of the Ciucă Cabinet ===
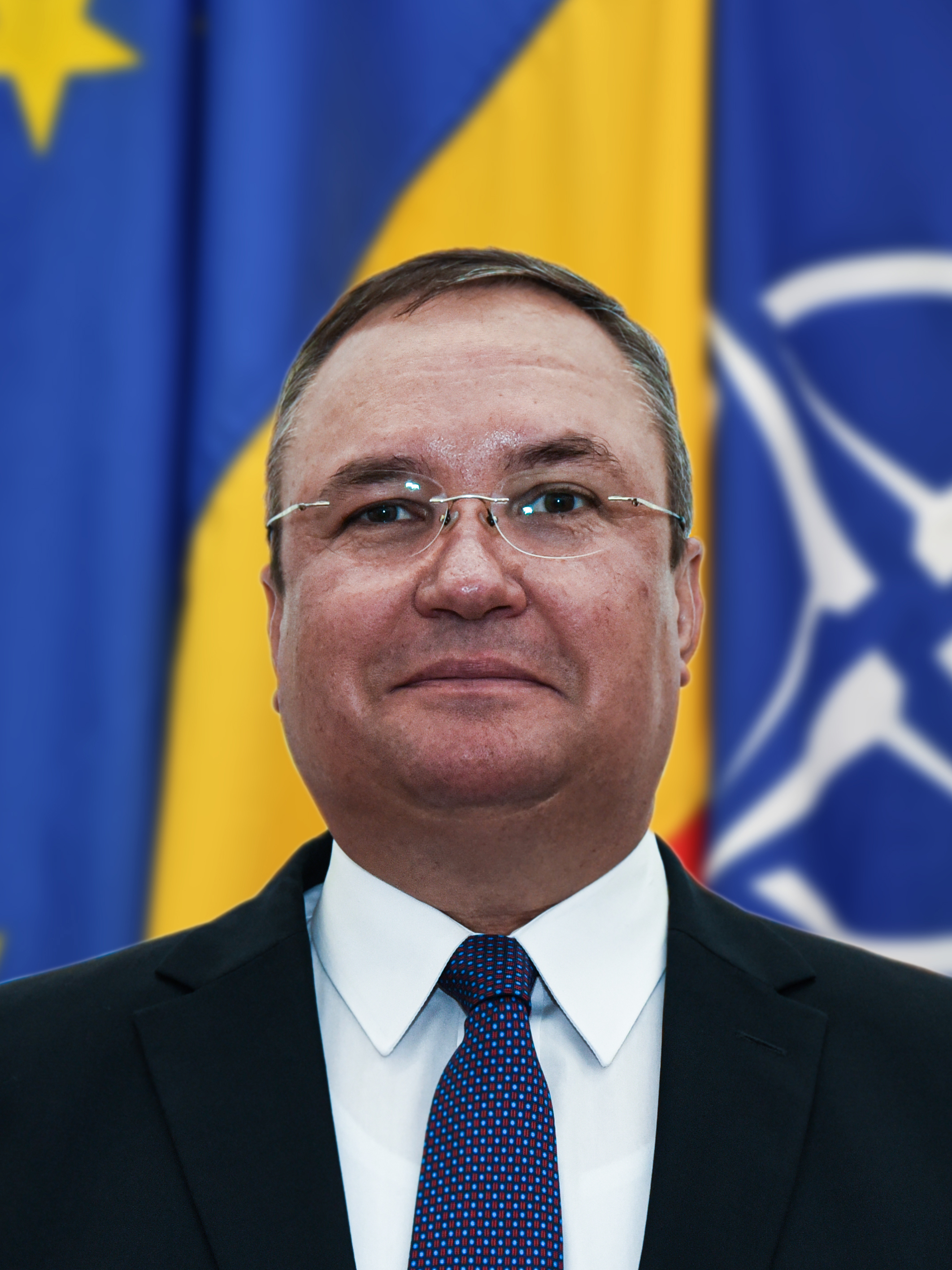
Nicolae Ciucă (pictured) became prime minister on 25 November 2021, ending the political crisis.

On 22 November 2021, the Social Democratic Party (PSD) leadership unanimously voted for entry to governance together with the PNL and UDMR, in a cabinet led by a prime minister from the PNL, specifically Nicolae Ciucă. On the other hand, the PNL convened the National Political Bureau for a meeting, which was boycotted by Raluca Turcan, who voted against a government with PSD and asked for the resignation of Florin Cîțu as PNL president. Later on the same day, President Klaus Iohannis designated again Ciucă as prime minister after a new series of consultations with political parties.

On 23 November 2021, PSD president Marcel Ciolacu was elected as the President of the Chamber of Deputies for his second term. Anca Dragu (USR) was fired from her position as President of the Senate, at the request of the PNL, so that Florin Cîțu can hold the position instead. In response, Dragu stated that "the first concern of the new USL [the PSD-PNL-UDMR coalition] was to provide a function [the Senate presidency] for the party" and announced that she will file a complaint to the Constitutional Court on the matter, calling it a "tyranny" and "abuse of power". Later the same day, the parliamentarians who left the PNL parliamentary group in support of Orban left the PNL itself as a whole. The cabinet hearings took place on 24 November.

The Ciucă Cabinet passed the Parliament on a 318–126 vote, consequently being sworn in on 25 November 2021, thus ending the 2021 Romanian political crisis.

== Aftermath ==
The political crisis shed light on the issue of constitutional reform, with the newly sworn in government expressing its intention for a second revision of the current 1991 Constitution of Romania "to reflect a state model in line with the needs of today's society". Changes are likely to include a clarification of the attributions of the President of Romania, as well as a regulation of the constructive motion of no confidence system, similar to that of countries like Germany or Spain, among others.

On 8 December 2021, the National Anticorruption Directorate (DNA) began investigating the way the September 2021 PNL congress was organized on the grounds of thwarting the fight against diseases (specifically COVID-19) and abuse of office.

On 14 December 2021, former PNL president Ludovic Orban announced the formal establishment of his party, the Force of the Right (FD), after 2 months of speculations, while Florin Cîțu resigned as PNL president on 2 April 2022.

Since the investment of the Ciucă-led CNR cabinet, Romania experience a shift towards authoritarianism and illiberalism.

== Hypothetical early elections ==
The Social Democratic Party (PSD) insisted at the beginning of the political crisis that snap legislative elections for the Romanian Parliament are the only solution towards ending the political crisis for a legitimate and stable government. Although Deputy Prime Minister Hunor Kelemen believed that the political crisis would calm down after the congresses of PNL and USR PLUS, he considered early elections a possible scenario, however President Klaus Iohannis and Prime Minister Florin Cîțu both opposed this idea. Furthermore, the co-president of USR PLUS Dacian Cioloș also considered snap elections as a scenario, which all only depends on the PSD and not his party on the matter. Rareș Bogdan stated that early elections are "impossible" and that 'once a parliamentarian is in the Palace of the Parliament, the chance to vote to lose their mandate is zero'. AUR also supported the possibility of early elections.

According to an opinion poll from late August 2021 by Avangarde, if elections were to be held, the PSD would get 35% of all votes, while PNL would get only 21%. In addition, AUR would get 14%, more than USR PLUS (13%), and UDMR and PMP would barely pass the electoral threshold (5%). In another opinion poll (by CURS) from mid September 2021, PSD had risen to 36%, while PNL and USR PLUS fell to 19% and 11% respectively.

== Impeachment of Klaus Iohannis ==
On 1 November 2021, the Alliance for the Union of Romanians (AUR) announced that it began proceedings for the impeachment of President Klaus Iohannis, citing "repeated violations of the Constitution" since the start of his presidential term. This came shortly after Ludovic Orban expressed his scepticism on the prospect if Iohannis will ever end his second term as president without being suspended by the Parliament. Subsequently, Orban even stated that he will strongly support and involve himself in the impeachment process of Iohannis.

In an CURS opinion poll from the said month, 35% of respondents considered President Iohannis to be the primarily responsible for the political crisis. In late February 2022, George Simion announced that his party (AUR) has garnered a million signatures for initiating the impeachment process of Iohannis.

== Protests ==
On 3 October 2021, upon the call of the leaders of AUR along with the Senator Diana Șoșoacă (de facto aligned with Ninel Peia's PNR), significant anti-governmental and anti-COVID-19 restriction protests were held throughout the country, most notably the University Square in Bucharest where c. 15,000 people participated. Minor violence and clashes among protesters and the police have been confirmed in Rădăuți, Suceava County. On the other hand, in Bucharest, Lazăr Maior, Călin Georgescu, Dan Puric, and Cristian Terheș called for civil disobedience, which was deemed totally irresponsible later on by Cîțu.

During the vote in the parliament for the Ciucă Cabinet, several protesters broke in the Palace of the Parliament to protest against the cabinet's formation. Sitting on the floor holding their arms, the guard unsuccessfully tried to drive them out.

== Reactions ==
=== Domestic ===
- Former Romanian prime minister Victor Ponta (who is also the current leader of PRO Romania) also criticized the situation, claiming it is a useless conflict, that affects the country.
- Monica Anisie, former Minister of Education in both the first and second Orban cabinets, claimed that the breakup of the three-party coalition was the result of Orban's disastrous negotiations.
- The representatives of the People's Movement Party (PMP) condemned the events that caused the political crisis and called for accountability, stating that the three-party coalition had demonstrated "immaturity and inadequacy" in the midst of the health and social crisis.
- Vlad Voiculescu, former Minister of Health in the Cîțu Cabinet criticized the actions of the government that ignited the situation, claiming that PNDL 1 and 2 were "theft" and that the Anghel Saligny investment program would be "another theft", reproaching Prime Minister Cîţu to seek approval for the ordinance on the program without the Minister of Justice's approval.
- Theodor Paleologu, former Minister of Culture, criticized the argument between the two parties, claiming that in the pandemic crisis there must be a stable government, and if the USR condition to return to government is Cîțu's resignation, then the latter should leave.
- Mihail Neamțu, a right-wing and conservative politician, one of the leading members of the People's Movement Party, also backs Cîțu's resignation, claiming that if a referendum were made to dismiss Iohannis, he would vote.
- During the debating for the motion of no confidence on 5 October 2021, Daniel Fenechiu (PNL) stated that a coalition has been formed against the people who have taken over the government, who want to do things. Moreover, he said the following: 'I understand if you [the voters of the motion of no confidence] came up with a project. You are united by your hatred of Florin Cîțu. Because Florin Cîțu wanted to do things'.
- Liviu Dragnea, former president of the Chamber of Deputies and of the PSD, stated that President Iohannis wanted total control over the PNL, which under the leadership of Ludovic Orban would not have been possible, as well as that the PSD "got into the political game of the president". He criticized the government as well.

=== International ===
- (European Union) Iratxe García, the leader of the Progressive Alliance of Socialists and Democrats in the European Parliament stated on Twitter in Romanian language: "The Romanians deserve a government responding to their needs. The motion of no confidence [against the Cîțu Cabinet] is an opportunity to put an end to the political crisis".
- (Spain) The Spanish newspaper El País made an article on the political crisis. According to the Madrid-based newspaper, "the political paralysis, which aggravates the energy crisis, has stoked in Romanians the infamous memory of the winters under the dictatorship of Nicolae Ceaușescu".
- (Germany) The German newspaper Frankfurter Allgemeine Zeitung (FAZ) criticized Romanian President Klaus Iohannis of "intensely militating for Cîțu to become PNL president", in an article which debuted as follows: "What is certain is that the fall of the [Cîțu] government is also a political defeat for the President of Romania [Iohannis]".

== Impact ==
The political crisis had a somewhat severe impact on the Romanian economy, which was already affected by the COVID-19 pandemic. Energy and food prices have increased, and caused a boost to the depreciation of the Romanian leu, with the reference rate in report with the euro exceeding 5 lei in some banks. According to the National Bank of Romania (BNR), the reference rate was almost 4.95 lei/euro on 22 September 2021, a record high at that time. On 26 February 2020, when the first case of COVID-19 was detected in Romania, the reference rate was 4.8074 lei/euro. On 31 August 2021, it was 4.93 lei/euro. The pound sterling and the US dollar had both also risen consistently above the leu as well.

Furthermore, the crisis interfered with the fourth wave of the COVID-19 pandemic in Romania. USR PLUS (to which the Ministry of Health belonged) exiting the Cîțu Cabinet, with Attila Cseke (UDMR) becoming acting Health Minister, followed by the adoption of the motion of no confidence against the Cîțu Cabinet, limited the government's abilities to put a pandemic under control, with pressure on Romania's public health system going very high as thousands of people have been getting infected with SARS-CoV-2 every day. Nonetheless, the caretaker government managed to reduce the number of new cases in 24 hours to 2,700 by 24 November 2021, down from the record high of over 18,000 on 19 October.

== Opinion polling ==
=== Prime minister approval ratings ===
View source data.

Polling firm	Fieldwork date	Sample size	Florin Vasile Cîțu (PNL)			
Polling firm	Fieldwork date	Sample size	check	X mark	Question	Net
Avangarde	16–24 Nov 2021	900	5.0	77.0	18.0	−72.0
Avangarde	17–26 Oct 2021	900	7.0	74.0	19.0	−67.0
Avangarde	14–21 Sep 2021	900	14.0	61.0	25.0	−47.0
CURS	12–20 Aug 2021	1.100	18.0	77.0	5.0	−59.0
CURS	11–18 Jun 2021	1.067	19.0	75.0	6.0	−56.0
CURS	14–17 Apr 21	1.107	24.0	69.0	7.0	−45.0
BCS	11 Apr 21	1.420	21.6	68.5	9.8	−46.9

=== Questioning ===
Polling firm	Date	Question	Klaus Iohannis	PNL	USR	Florin Cîțu	PSD	AUR	UDMR	Both PNL & USR	Everyone	Do not know/No opinion
CURS	Nov 2021	Who do you think is most to blame for the political crisis we are currently going through?	35%	9%	5%	—N/a	7%	2%	1%	24%	12%	5%
Avangarde	Oct 2021	From your point of view, who is the main culprit for the current political crisis?	18%	14%	11%	8%	1%	—N/a	—N/a	—N/a	—N/a	48%

== See also ==
- Investigations involving Victor Ponta
- 2012 Romanian constitutional crisis
- 2026 Romanian political crisis
- Politics in Romania
