= Ciucă cabinet =

132nd government of Romania

Ciucă Cabinet
- 132nd Cabinet of Romania

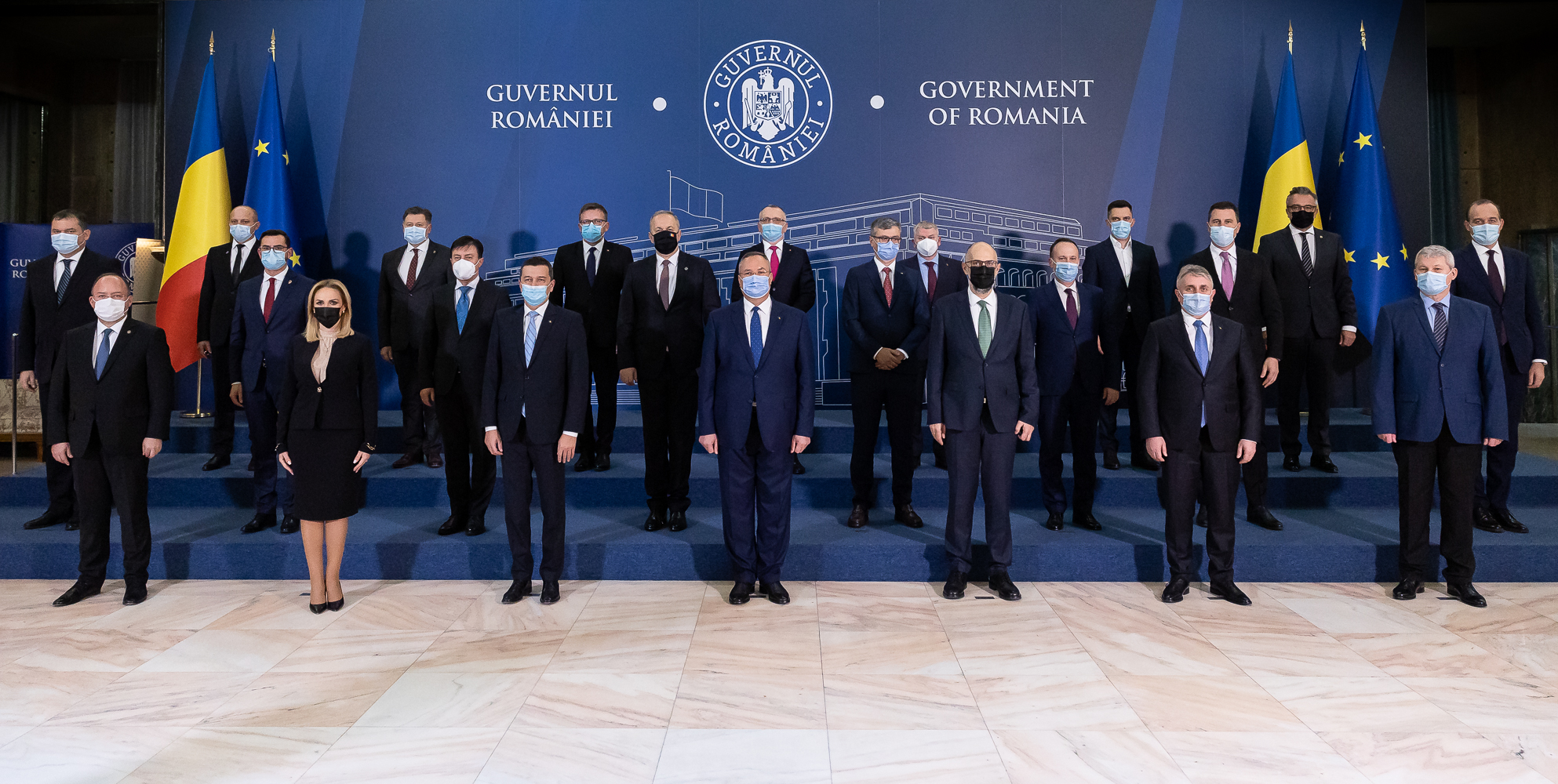
- Official cabinet portrait
- Date formed: 25 November 2021
- Date dissolved: 12 June 2023

People and organisations
- President: Klaus Iohannis
- Prime Minister: Nicolae Ciucă (until 12 June 2023) (PNL); Cătălin Predoiu (acting, from the 12 June 2023 to 15 June 2023) (PNL)
- Deputy Prime Ministers: Sorin Grindeanu (PSD); Hunor Kelemen (UDMR)
- Secretary-General: Marian Neacșu (PSD)
- No. of ministers: 21
- Total no. of members: 23
- Member parties: PSD; PNL; UDMR; PUSL
- Status in legislature: Rotative coalition (Majority)
- Opposition parties: USR; AUR; FD; SOS; REPER
- Opposition leaders: Cătălin Drulă (USR); George Simion (AUR); Ludovic Orban (FD); Diana Iovanovici Șoșoacă (SOS); Dragoș Pîslaru (REPER); Ramona Strugariu (REPER)

History
- Election: 2020
- Legislature term: 2020–2024
- Predecessor: Cîțu
- Successor: Ciolacu I

The Ciucă Cabinet (Romanian pronunciation: [ˈtʃjukə]) was the 132nd government of Romania led by former Romanian Land Forces army general Nicolae Ciucă (PNL; also current PNL president) from 25 November 2021 to 12 June 2023.

The grand coalition forming the government, consisting of Social Democratic Party (PSD), National Liberal Party (PNL), and Democratic Alliance of Hungarians in Romania (UDMR/RMDSZ), is also referred to as the National Coalition for Romania (Romanian: Coaliția Națională pentru România, CNR). The Social Liberal Humanist Party also received lower-level positions in the government.

Since the cabinet's investment, Romania experienced a shift towards authoritarianism and illiberalism. Under Ciucă's premiership, Romania experienced democratic backsliding, with The Economist ranking it last in the European Union in the world terms of democracy, even behind Viktor Orbán's Hungary. During Ciucă's premiership, the freedom of the press in Romania declined, according to World Press Freedom Index (from 75.09 in 2021 to 69.04 in 2023).

== Background and formation ==
On 1 September 2021, the PNL, then-prime minister Florin Cîțu and still incumbent president Klaus Iohannis triggered the 2021 Romanian political crisis by the sacking of former justice minister Stelian Ion, preceded by a scandal between the PNL and their former coalition partners, the progressive-liberal USR PLUS (from which Ion stemmed), on the so-called Anghel Saligny investment program (or "PNDL 3", as it is also known). The remaining USR ministers eventually resigned on their own, and the Cîțu Cabinet, which preceded the Ciucă Cabinet, was dismissed on 5 October through a motion of no confidence, with a record number of votes on behalf of USR, PSD, and AUR.

The prime minister candidate, who is designated by the president, has to request the investiture vote/vote of confidence from the legislature within 10 days from being appointed. On 11 October, President Iohannis designated Dacian Cioloș of the USR to form the next government, but his government was subsequently rejected by the parliament. Nicolae Ciucă of PNL was designated for the same position on 20 October, but eventually submitted his term. At that time, he was ordered by the PNL to convene negotiations only for a PNL-UDMR minority government, which is a form of government that was not accepted by a party other than PNL and UDMR.

The national-liberals resorted to negotiations with the largest party in the parliament, the Social Democratic Party (PSD) in the prospect of forming a majority government with full powers, but they quickly reached a deadlock. The PSD, who were the main opposition party against the cabinets formed around the PNL up to this point, wanted the office of Prime Minister, but the PNL refused to cede the office and strongly desired that the office be occupied by a PNL member, which happened with the re-designation of Nicolae Ciucă by President Iohannis on 22 November, one day after the negotiations ended.

The cabinet hearings took place on 24 November. The Ciucă Cabinet was sworn in on 25 November.

== Technological initiatives ==
The cabinet has shown support for some technological projects such as: nuclear energy by small modular nuclear reactors through a partnership with the US firm NuScale Power, electric vehicle development by a group of investors from Cluj and green energy projects. The cabinet also supports the Anghel Saligny investment program.

== Composition ==
The Ciucă Cabinet was a grand coalition government consisting of the Social Democratic Party (PSD), the National Liberal Party (PNL) and the Democratic Alliance of Hungarians in Romania (UDMR/RMDSZ). Some positions within the government are set to rotate between the PSD and the PNL, more specifically the prime minister, the secretary-general of the government, and the ministries of interior, justice, finance, and defense. The next shuffle was originally planned to take place by 1 June 2023, though this was delayed on 26 May following a general strike in the Romanian education system that began a few days earlier.

Position	Minister	Party	Date sworn in	Left office	Home county
Prime Minister (Romanian: Prim-ministru)	Nicolae Ciucă	PNL	25 November 2021	12 June 2023	Dolj
Prime Minister (Romanian: Prim-ministru)	Cătălin Predoiu (acting)	PNL	12 June 2023	15 June 2023	Buzău
Deputy Prime Minister (Romanian: Viceprim-ministru)	Sorin Grindeanu	PSD	25 November 2021	15 June 2023	Caraș-Severin
Deputy Prime Minister (Romanian: Viceprim-ministru)	Kelemen Hunor	UDMR	25 November 2021	15 June 2023	Harghita
Secretary-General of the Government (Romanian: Secretarul General al Guvernului)	Marian Neacșu	PSD	7 December 2021	15 June 2023	Ialomița
Minister of Foreign Affairs (Romanian: Ministrul Afacerilor Externe)	Bogdan Aurescu	PNL	25 November 2021	15 June 2023	Bucharest
Minister of Internal Affairs (Romanian: Ministrul Afacerilor Interne)	Lucian Bode	PNL	25 November 2021	15 June 2023	Sălaj
Minister of Agriculture and Rural Development (Romanian: Ministrul Agriculturii și Dezvoltării Rurale)	Adrian Chesnoiu	PSD	25 November 2021	23 June 2022	Olt
Minister of Agriculture and Rural Development (Romanian: Ministrul Agriculturii și Dezvoltării Rurale)	Sorin Grindeanu (acting)	PSD	23 June 2022	8 July 2022	Caraș-Severin
Minister of Agriculture and Rural Development (Romanian: Ministrul Agriculturii și Dezvoltării Rurale)	Petre Daea	PSD	8 July 2022	15 June 2023	Mehedinți
Minister of National Defence (Romanian: Ministrul Apărării Naționale)	Vasile Dîncu	PSD	25 November 2021	24 October 2022	Bistrița-Năsăud
Minister of National Defence (Romanian: Ministrul Apărării Naționale)	Nicolae Ciucă (acting)	PNL	24 October 2022	31 October 2022	Dolj
Minister of National Defence (Romanian: Ministrul Apărării Naționale)	Angel Tîlvăr	PSD	31 October 2022	15 June 2023	Vrancea
Minister of Research, Innovation and Digitalisation (Romanian: Ministrul Cercetării, Inovării și Digitalizării)	Florin Roman	PNL	25 November 2021	15 December 2021	Alba
Minister of Research, Innovation and Digitalisation (Romanian: Ministrul Cercetării, Inovării și Digitalizării)	Virgil Popescu (acting)	PNL	15 December 2021	28 January 2022	Mehedinți
Minister of Research, Innovation and Digitalisation (Romanian: Ministrul Cercetării, Inovării și Digitalizării)	Marcel Boloș	PNL	28 January 2022	3 May 2022	Cluj
Minister of Research, Innovation and Digitalisation (Romanian: Ministrul Cercetării, Inovării și Digitalizării)	Sebastian Burduja	PNL	3 May 2022	15 June 2023	Bucharest
Minister of Culture (Romanian: Ministrul Culturii)	Lucian Romașcanu	PSD	25 November 2021	15 June 2023	Buzău
Minister of Development, Public Works and Administration (Romanian: Ministrul Dezvoltării, Lucrărilor Publice și Administrației)	Cseke Attila	UDMR	25 November 2021	15 June 2023	Bihor
Minister of Education (Romanian: Ministrul Educației)	Sorin Cîmpeanu	PNL	25 November 2021	29 September 2022	Bucharest
Minister of Education (Romanian: Ministrul Educației)	Ligia Deca	PNL	3 October 2022	15 June 2023	Hunedoara
Minister of Energy (Romanian: Ministrul Energiei)	Virgil Popescu	PNL	25 November 2021	15 June 2023	Mehedinți
Minister of Economy (Romanian: Ministrul Economiei)	Florin Spătaru	PSD	25 November 2021	15 June 2023	Galați
Minister of Labour and Social Solidarity (Romanian: Ministrul Muncii și Solidarității Sociale)	Marius Budăi	PSD	25 November 2021	15 June 2023	Botoșani
Minister of Environment, Water and Forests (Romanian: Ministrul Mediului, Apelor și Pădurilor)	Tánczos Barna	UDMR	25 November 2021	15 June 2023	Harghita
Minister of Transport and Infrastructure (Romanian: Ministrul Transporturilor și Infrastructurii)	Sorin Grindeanu	PSD	25 November 2021	15 June 2023	Caraș-Severin
Minister of Finance (Romanian: Ministrul Finanțelor)	Adrian Câciu	PSD	25 November 2021	15 June 2023	Bucharest
Minister of Justice (Romanian: Ministrul Justiției)	Cătălin Predoiu	PNL	25 November 2021	15 June 2023	Buzău
Minister of Health (Romanian: Ministrul Sănătății)	Alexandru Rafila	PSD	25 November 2021	15 June 2023	Bucharest
Minister of Investments and European Projects (Romanian: Ministrul Investițiilor și Proiectelor Europene)	Dan Vîlceanu	PNL	25 November 2021	7 April 2022	Gorj
Minister of Investments and European Projects (Romanian: Ministrul Investițiilor și Proiectelor Europene)	Marcel Boloș	PNL	3 May 2022	15 June 2023	Cluj
Minister of Sport (Romanian: Ministrul Sportului)	Eduard Novak	UDMR	25 November 2021	15 June 2023	Harghita
Minister of Family, Youth and Equality of Opportunity (Romanian: Ministrul Familiei, Tineretului și Egalității de Șanse)	Gabriela Firea	PSD	25 November 2021	15 June 2023	Bacău
Minister of Entrepreneurship and Tourism (Romanian: Ministrul Antreprenoriatului și Turismului)	Constantin Cadariu	PNL	25 November 2021	15 June 2023	Suceava

=== Party breakdown ===
Party breakdown of cabinet members on the date of dissolution:

- Social Democratic Party (PSD) = 1 Deputy Prime Minister and Minister, 1 Secretary-General of the Government and 8 ministers
10
- National Liberal Party (PNL) = 1 Prime Minister and 8 ministers
9
- Democratic Alliance of Hungarians in Romania (UDMR/RMDSZ) = 1 Deputy Prime Minister and 3 ministers
4
