= Orban cabinet =

Orban cabinet may refer to:

- First Orban cabinet, 2019–2020
- Second Orban cabinet, 2020
