= Teleman (surname) =

Teleman is a surname. Notable people with the surname include:

- Ciprian Teleman (born 1969), Romanian politician
- Constantin Teleman (born 1968), Romanian-American mathematician
- Gheorghe Teleman (1838–1913), Romanian general
