= Nechita-Adrian Oros =

Romanian politician (born 1965)

Minister of Agriculture and Rural Development
- In office 23 December 2020 – 28 September 2021
- Prime Minister: Florin Cîțu
- Preceded by: Petre Daea
- Succeeded by: Adrian Chesnoiu

Member of the Romanian Chamber of Deputies
- In office 19 December 2012 – 21 December 2020
- Constituency: Cluj County

Personal details
- Born: July 9, 1965 Gherla, Cluj County, Romania
- Party: National Liberal Party (PNL)
- Education: University of Agricultural Sciences and Veterinary Medicine of Cluj-Napoca

Nechita-Adrian Oros (born July 9, 1965) is a Romanian politician who formerly served as Minister of Agriculture and Rural Development in the Cîțu Cabinet, led by Prime Minister Florin Cîțu, as of 23 December 2020. He previously served in this position in the first and second cabinet led by Ludovic Orban. He is affiliated with the National Liberal Party (PNL).

Born in Gherla, Cluj County, Oros studied from 1984 to 1989 at the Faculty of Veterinary Medicine at the University of Agricultural Sciences and Veterinary Medicine (USAMV) in Cluj-Napoca, graduating with a doctor's degree in veterinary medicine. He was an assistant professor of Medical Pathology (1993–1999), associate professor of Toxicology (since 2005), pro-dean of the Faculty of Veterinary Medicine (2008–2012), and currently a professor and deputy rector of USAMV Cluj-Napoca.

Between 2003 and 2008, Oros was a member of the Christian Democratic National Peasants' Party (PNȚCD). He has been a member of the PNL since 2008; he was elected to the Chamber of Deputies for 2012–2016, and was re-elected as MP from Cluj County in December 2016.
