= Florin Spătaru =

Romanian politician

Minister of Economy
- Incumbent
- Assumed office 25 November 2021

Personal details
- Born: 22 December 1969 (age 56) Galați, Romania
- Party: Social Democratic Party

Florin Spătaru (Note: Romanian pronunciation: [floˈrin spəˈtaru]) (born 22 December 1969, Galați, Romania) is a Romanian politician who held the position of Minister of Economy in the Government of Nicolae Ciucă, a member of the Social Democratic Party.

== Curriculum vitae ==
He graduated from the industrial high school in Galați (1988). In 1995 he obtained a master's degree in engineering and marine architecture from Universitatea "Dunărea de Jos" din Galați, and in 2002, a BA in accounting and management computer science from the same university. In the years 2009–2012 he completed doctoral studies at the Academy of Economic Studies in Bucharest. From the mid-1990s, he was professionally associated with the shipyard in Galați, part of the Dutch Damen Shipyards Group. In 2004 he became the economic director of this company, and in 2009 the director responsible for HR and corporate affairs. In 2018, he assumed the same position at the Mangalia shipyard (controlled by the same company).

In 2009 he became vice president of ANCONAV, the national shipbuilding association. In 2013, he was appointed president of this organization.

In November 2021, on the recommendation of the Social Democratic Party, he became the minister of economy in the then-formed government headed by Nicolae Ciucă.
