= Lucian Bode =

Romanian politician (born 1974)

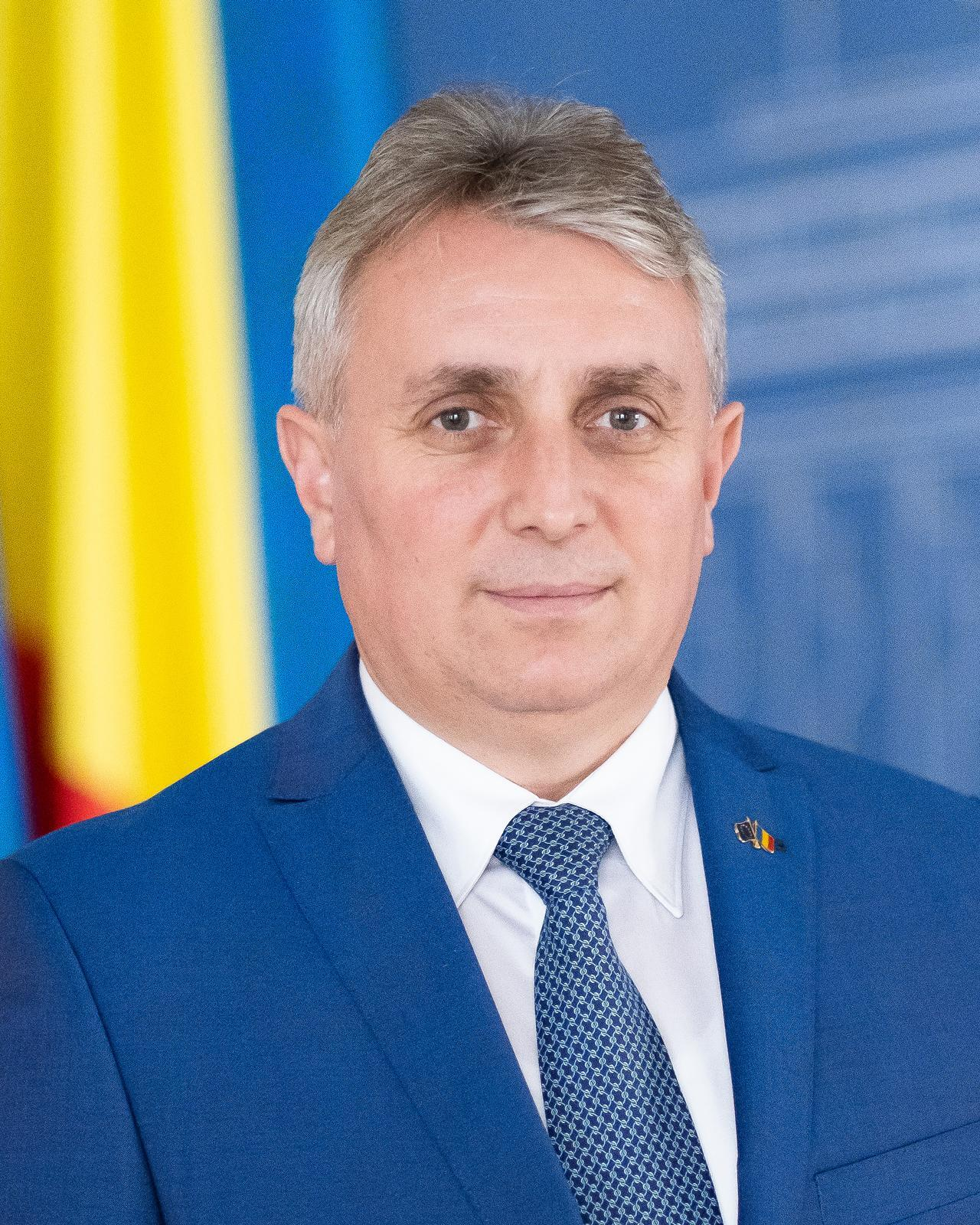
- Official portrait, 2020

Minister of Justice
- Acting
- In office 1 September 2021 – 25 November 2021
- Prime Minister: Florin Cîțu
- Preceded by: Stelian Ion
- Succeeded by: Cătălin Predoiu

Minister of Internal Affairs
- In office 23 December 2020 – 15 June 2023
- Prime Minister: Florin Cîțu; Nicolae Ciucă
- Preceded by: Marcel Vela
- Succeeded by: Cătălin Predoiu

Minister for Transport and Infrastructure
- In office 4 November 2019 – 23 December 2020
- Prime Minister: Ludovic Orban
- Preceded by: Alexandru-Răzvan Cuc
- Succeeded by: Cătălin Drulă

Minister of Economy, Entrepreneurship and Tourism
- In office 9 February 2012 – 7 May 2012
- Prime Minister: Mihai Răzvan Ungureanu
- Preceded by: Ion Ariton
- Succeeded by: Daniel Chițoiu

Member of the Chamber of Deputies
- Incumbent
- Assumed office 19 December 2012
- Constituency: Sălaj County

Personal details
- Born: 27 October 1974 (age 51) Valcău de Jos, Sălaj County, Romania
- Party: National Liberal Party (PNL) (2014–present)
- Other political affiliations: Democratic Liberal Party (PDL) (2007–2014) Democratic Party (PD) (before 2007)
- Education: University of Oradea
- Profession: Engineer

Lucian Bode (born 27 October 1974, in Valcău de Jos, Sălaj County, Romania) is a Romanian politician who served as Minister of Internal Affairs in the Cîțu Cabinet from 2020 to 2023. He previously served as Minister for Transport, Information and Communications in the first cabinet and second cabinet led by Ludovic Orban. He is affiliated with the National Liberal Party (PNL).

== Controversies ==
On 11 January 2023, Babeș-Bolyai University claimed that the suspicions of plagiarism in the doctoral thesis of Interior Minister Lucian Bode "are confirmed in the vast majority" and requested the withdrawal of the book published on its basis. The position expressed by the university from Cluj-Napoca, where Lucian Bode defended a doctoral thesis in the field of energy security, comes after the ethics committee of the educational institution verified the minister’s work.
