= 2026 Romanian political crisis =

2026 government crisis in Romania

- Date: 20 April 2026 – 20 October 2026 (6 months)
- Location: Romania
- Caused by: Disagreements over the "Bolojan Plan" to list minority stakes of state-owned enterprises on the Bucharest Stock Exchange; Withdrawal of the Social Democratic Party from the governing coalition; Adoption of austerity measures, including public wage and pension cuts, to meet IMF deficit targets
- Result: Collapse of the Bolojan cabinet through a motion of no confidence; Failed prime ministerial proposals (Eugen Tomac, Adrian Veștea & Siegfried Mureșan); Continued parliamentary deadlock and warnings of economic recession from Fitch and Goldman Sachs; Election of Luca Niculescu as prime minister

Parties
(Romania) Executive Power: President; Government; National Liberal Party (PNL); Save Romania Union (USR); Supported by: Democratic Alliance of Hungarians in Romania (UDMR/RMDSZ) (conditional)	(Romania) Legislative Power: Parliament; Chamber of Deputies; Senate; Social Democratic Party (PSD); Alliance for the Union of Romanians (AUR); Supported by: Ethnic minority parties (factional)

Lead figures
Nicușor Dan (President of Romania); Ilie Bolojan (Outgoing PM, PNL leader)	Sorin Grindeanu (PSD leader); George Simion (AUR leader)

The 2026 Romanian political crisis was a constitutional and governmental crisis in Romania that began on 20 April 2026 and ended on 20 October 2026. The bicameral Parliament passed a motion of no confidence against the government of Prime Minister Ilie Bolojan, forcing his cabinet to resign. President Nicușor Dan has been challenged to provide stability amid the crisis. The crisis has been characterised by the inability to form a new parliamentary majority, a failed prime ministerial nomination, deepening fiscal uncertainty, and warnings from international financial institutions regarding the country's economic stability. Former President Traian Băsescu described the situation as "the greatest political crisis since the Revolution". The crisis finally ended with the appointment of Luca Niculescu as Prime Minister, who took charge of a government composed largely of members from Social Democratic Party (PSD).

== Background ==
The political parties had difficulties forming a government after the 2024 parliamentary elections, but Marcel Ciolacu finally became prime minister again, continuing to lead the then pro-European coalition. However, almost half a year later, Ciolacu resigned, after Crin Antonescu, the coalition's joint candidate in the repeated presidential election, failed to advance to the second round. Ciolacu was succeeded by Ilie Bolojan, who had previously served as acting president for a short time after the Constitutional Court annulled the results of the previous presidential election, which had taken place at the same time as the parliamentary vote. Bolojan formed a grand coalition, also adding the Save Romania Union (USR) to the government alongside with the Social Democratic Party (SPD), the National Liberal Party (PNL) and the Democratic Alliance of Hungarians in Romania (UDMR/RMDSZ). The original plan was that Bolojan will hold the position until Spring 2027, then a social democratic prime minister will be again until the next election.

== Events ==
The crisis was precipitated in April 2026 by Bolojan's proposal to list minority stakes of several state-owned enterprises (SOEs), including CEC Bank, Hidroelectrica, and Romgaz, on the Bucharest Stock Exchange. The plan was part of a broader restructuring initiative intended to enforce financial transparency and market discipline while retaining state control. Bolojan claimed the plan aligned with Romania's EU-backed National Recovery and Resilience Plan, with the opposition from coalition partner PSD supposedly coming due to the plan's threat to its "political clientele"; Bolojan further accused parties of treating SOE positions as "sinecures for party loyalists" to extract rents. On 20 April, PSD announced a bill to ban such listings for two years, withdrew its ministers from the government, and, alongside the far-right Alliance for the Union of Romanians (AUR), filed a no-confidence motion accusing Bolojan of "selling state assets".

On 5 May 2026, Parliament passed the motion with 281 votes in favour, the largest such vote since the 1989 revolution, toppling the cabinet. This meant that a new government would have to be formed. The Senate subsequently passed the PSD-sponsored moratorium. Bolojan accused that the listing directly threatened PSD's ability to use these enterprises as tools for political rent extraction, a dynamic he explicitly identified as the crisis's underlying cause.

Since Bolojan's cabinet was toppled, Parliament has rejected two prime ministerial candidates: Adrian Veștea, and Siegfried Mureșan. Eugen Tomac, who was the first chosen one of Nicușor Dan before Veștea and Mureșan, withdrew from candidacy due to the lack of parliamentary majority.

The political crisis has occurred amid an economic crisis.

On 20 October, the Parliament voted Luca Niculescu as next prime minister on a 280–58 vote, which effectively ended the political crisis that has lasted for half a year.

== See also ==
- 2012 Romanian political crisis
- 2021 Romanian political crisis
