= Monica Anisie =

Romanian politician (born 1973)

Minister of Education and Research
- In office 4 November 2019 – 23 December 2020
- Prime Minister: Ludovic Orban; Nicolae Ciucă (Acting)
- Preceded by: Valentin Popa
- Succeeded by: Sorin Cîmpeanu

Personal details
- Born: 19 July 1973 (age 53)
- Party: National Liberal Party (PNL)

Monica Cristina Anisie (born 19 July 1973) is a Romanian politician affiliated with the National Liberal Party (PNL). She served as Minister of Education and Research in the first cabinet led by Ludovic Orban between November 2019 until March 2020. She also served in this position in the second Orban cabinet between March 2020 and December 2020.

== Biography ==
Monica Cristina Anisie studied at the Faculty of Foreign Languages and Literatures of the University of Bucharest between 1992 and 1996. She completed two Master's degree: one in educational management at the National University of Political Studies and Public Administration (2007-2008) and another in European integration and social issues at the Faculty of Political Science, Sociology, and International Relations (2007-2009).

After working as a teacher of Romanian language and literature, presidential advisor on education policy to Traian Băsescu between 2012 and 2016, and secretary of state in the Cioloș government, in November 2019 she became Minister of Education in the Orban government, appointed by Prime Minister Ludovic Orban after the fall of the Dăncilă government. She was voted in by parliament on November 4, 2019, and took office a day later. Anisie is currently the president of the PNL Sector 2 and the coordinator of the PNL's pre-university education commission.
