= Constantin-Daniel Cadariu =

Romanian politician (born 1967)

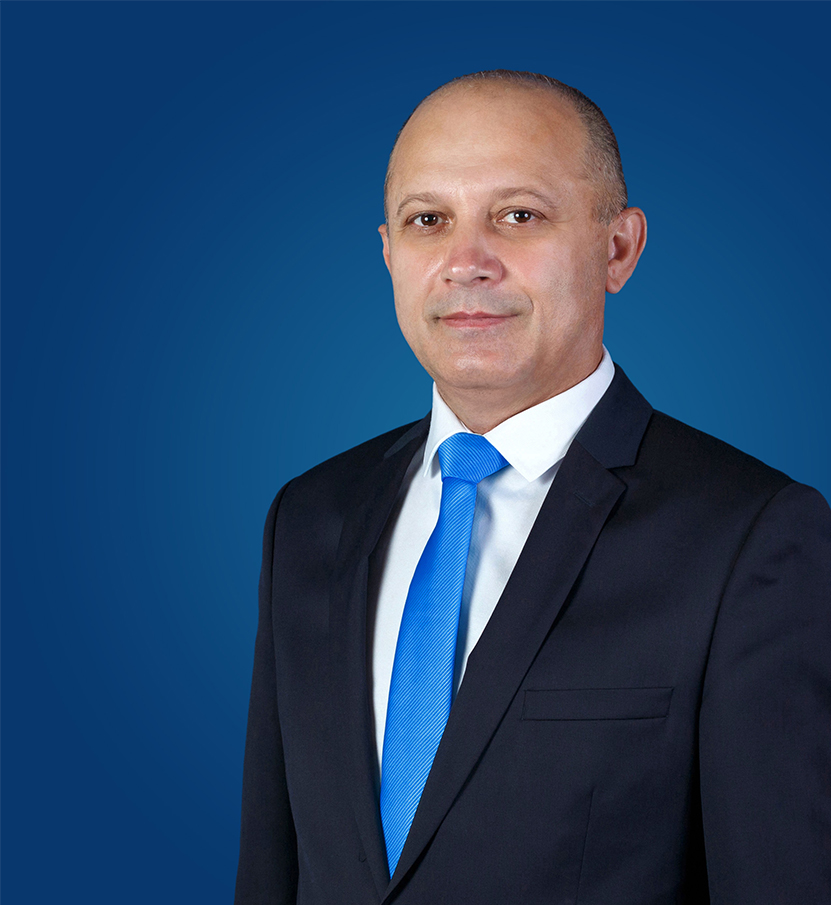

Minister of Entrepreneurship and Tourism
- Incumbent
- Assumed office November 25, 2021
- Preceded by: Claudiu Năsui

Member of the Romanian Senate from Suceava
- Incumbent
- Assumed office December 21, 2016

Personal details
- Born: December 16, 1967 (age 58) Salcea, Suceava, Romania
- Party: National Liberal Party (PNL)

Constantin-Daniel Cadariu (born December 16, 1967) is a Romanian politician, engineer and local government official, senator, Minister of Entrepreneurship and Tourism from 2021 onwards.

== Career ==
An engineer by education, he graduated from the Faculty of Mechanical Engineering of the Polytechnic Institute in Iași (later transformed into the Gheorghe Asachi Technical University). He worked as an accountant in a private enterprise, in 2005–2008 he was an official in the Ministry of Internal Affairs. He became involved in political activities within the National Liberal Party. He was a councilor in the town of Gura Humorului (2000–2004) and a councilor in the Suceava County (2004–2007). From 2008 to 2012, he was the vice-chairman of the district council. In 2016 he was elected to the Senate. In the 2020 elections, he successfully ran for Senate re-election.

In November 2021, he was appointed Minister of Entrepreneurship and Tourism in the government that was then formed, headed by Nicolae Ciucă.
