= Ciprian Teleman =

Romanian politician (born 1969)

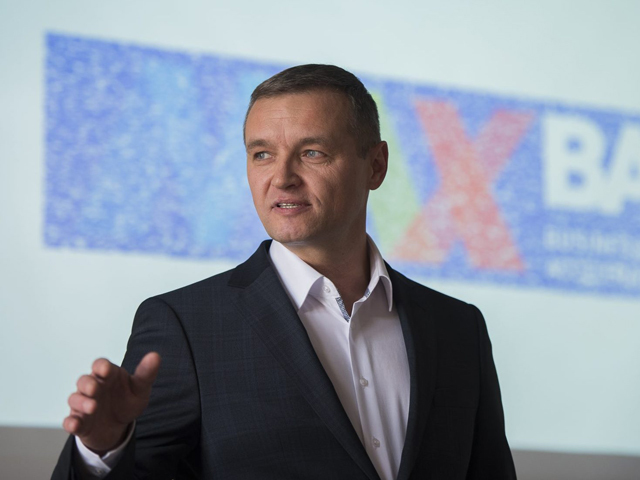

Minister of Research, Innovation and Digitalization
- In office 23 December 2020 – 6 September 2021
- President: Klaus Iohannis
- Prime Minister: Florin Cîțu

Personal details
- Born: 27 January 1969 (age 57)
- Party: Freedom, Unity and Solidarity Party (PLUS)

Ciprian Sergiu Teleman (born 27 January 1969) is a Romanian politician who has been serving as Minister of Research, Innovation and Digitalization in the Cîțu Cabinet, led by Prime Minister Florin Cîțu, as of 23 December 2020.
