= Cîțu cabinet =

131st cabinet of Romania

Cîțu Cabinet
- 131st Cabinet of Romania

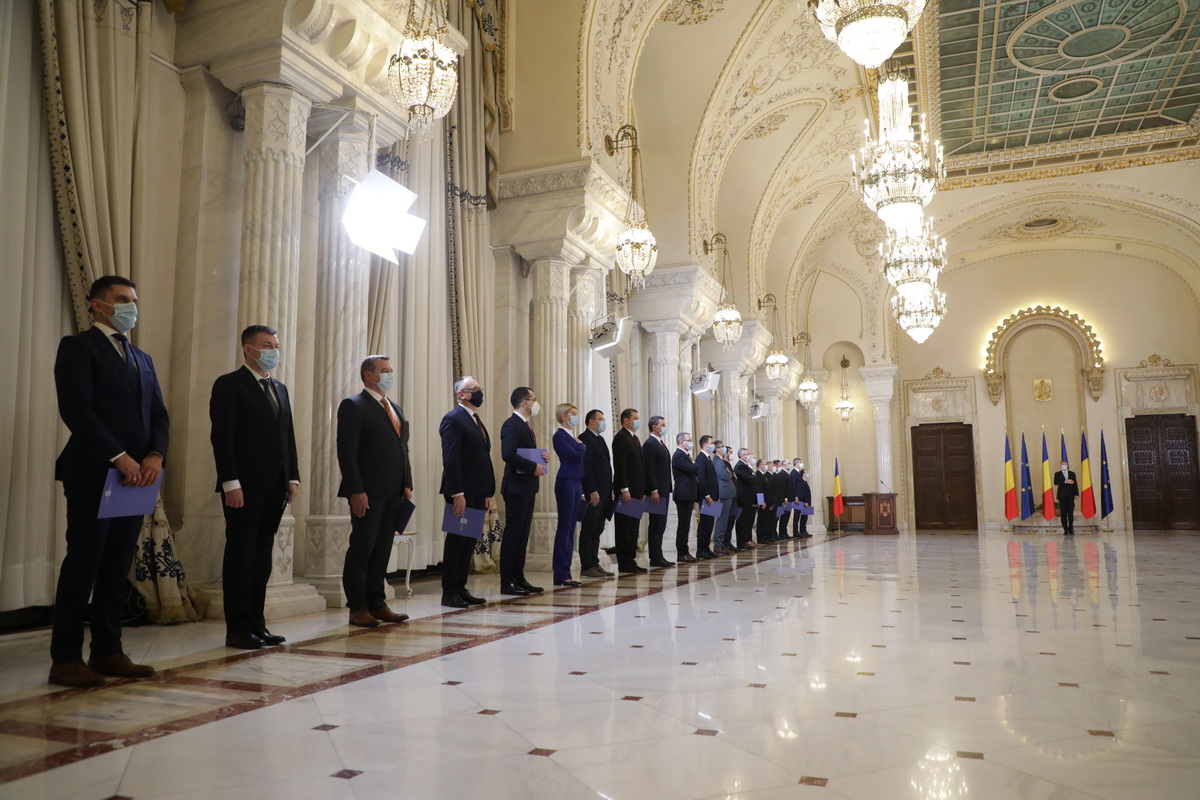
- Cabinet members at the swearing-in ceremony
- Date formed: 23 December 2020
- Date dissolved: 25 November 2021

People and organisations
- Head of state: Klaus Iohannis
- Head of government: Florin Cîțu
- Deputy head of government: Ilie Dan Barna (until 7 September 2021); Hunor Kelemen
- No. of ministers: 18
- Member parties: PNL; USR PLUS (Note: The merger between USR and PLUS was approved by 84.65% of those who voted at a joint congress held by the two parties on 15 August 2020. They ran for the Parliament as an electoral alliance known as the 2020 USR-PLUS Alliance.) (before 7 September 2021); UDMR/RMDSZ
- Status in legislature: Coalition (Majority) (before 7 September 2021); Minority government (after 7 September 2021)
- Opposition parties: PSD; AUR; USR (since 7 September 2021)
- Opposition leaders: Marcel Ciolacu; George Simion; Claudiu Târziu; Dan Barna (7 September–1 October 2021); Dacian Cioloș (since 7 September 2021)

History
- Election: 2020
- Legislature term: 2020–2024
- Predecessor: Orban II
- Successor: Ciucă

The Cîțu Cabinet was the 131st government of Romania, led by the national liberal (PNL) Prime Minister Florin Cîțu. It was removed from office after a motion of no confidence passed by the Parliament with a record of 281 votes, the largest number of votes on a motion of no confidence since the Romanian Revolution.

== Formation of the government and negotiations ==
=== Procedure ===
The prime minister candidate, who is designated by the president, has to request the investiture vote/vote of confidence from the legislature within 10 days from being appointed.

=== Consultations with the president ===
On 6 December 2020, elections for a new Romanian Parliament took place. On 10 December 2020, the incumbent President of Romania, Klaus Iohannis, invited all the parties that acceded into the newly elected Parliament, more specifically PSD, PNL, USR-PLUS, AUR, and UDMR/RMDSZ as well as the representatives of the national minorities for consultations at Cotroceni Palace on 14 December 2020.

=== Political negotiations ===
On 7 December 2020, the leader of the UDMR/RMDSZ senators of the 2016–2020 legislature of the Romanian Parliament, Attila Cseke stated that Hunor Kelemen, the current president of the party, had talked to Klaus Iohannis and that they were awaiting for the finalisation of the count of the election votes.

On 9 December 2020, EPP MEP from the PNL, Rareș Bogdan, was confident the government would be approved by 23 December, and that the cabinet would have between 16 and 18 ministries.

The National Liberal Party (PNL), USR-PLUS, and the Democratic Alliance of Hungarians in Romania (UDMR/RMDSZ) had met at Vila Lac 1 on 12 December 2020 to negotiate on making up the coalition government proposition and on several key aspects: the collaboration in the parliament, the government positions, and the governance programme. The UDMR were not prepared, nor willing to take any key function within the newly elected parliament.

On 12 December 2020, political negotiations had reached a stalemate, since the liberals wanted Ludovic Orban to preside over the Chamber of Deputies, while USR-PLUS wanted Dan Barna to become its president. On 15 December 2020, Dan Barna announced his desire for Cătălin Drulă to become the president of the Chamber of Deputies on behalf of USR PLUS, which angered Ludovic Orban.

== Vote in the parliament ==
After the president proposed Florin Cîțu to the position of Prime Minister on 22 December, the proposed government was subsequently also brought to the parliament for the voting procedure on 23 December. All minister propositions had passed the hearings in the parliamentary commissions on the same day. It was approved by the parliament, with 260 votes in favour and 183 votes against giving the Cîțu Cabinet confidence, more than the minimum 228 necessary votes.

== Fall of the government ==
The government was threatened as of result of the passing of the "National Anghel Saligny Investment Plan" (Romanian: Planul Național de Investiții Anghel Saligny) (or PNDL 3) and of the ousting of Justice Minister Stelian Ion. On 3 September 2021, member of the coalition government, USR PLUS alongside opposition party AUR lodged a vote of no confidence against Florin Cîțu and his government entitled "The dismissal of the Cîțu Government, Romania's only chance to live!" (Romanian: Demiterea Guvernului Cîțu, singura șansă a României de a trăi!). All ministers originating from USR PLUS resigned from their positions on 7 September 2021.

On 4 October 2021, a day before the motion of no confidence, the Cîțu Cabinet had approved a multitude of government emergency ordinances (Romanian: Ordonanțe de urgență ale Guvernului, O.U.G.) and government decisions (Romanian: Hotărâri de Guvern, H.G.).

The cabinet continued to function as a PNL-UDMR/RMDSZ minority government until 5 October 2021, when it was dissolved by a motion of no confidence entitled "Stop poverty, price increases and criminals! Down with the Cîțu Government!" (Romanian: Stop sărăciei, scumpirilor și penalilor! Jos Guvernul Cîțu!) submitted by the Social Democratic Party (PSD), with 281 votes "for" adoption, and a lack of abstentions and "against" votes. Out of a total of 466 members of parliament, only 318 showed up. On the day of the motion, social democratic members of parliament brought a Superman hanging upside down, in a pool of blood - alluding to a social media post made by Florin Cîțu with the superhero. Deputy president of the PNL, Alina Gorghiu, reacted to the prop, saying it was a call to violence on Facebook. Until the next cabinet was voted in the Parliament, the Cîțu cabinet continued on as an acting/ad interim government. It is the sixth post-revolutionary government in the recent history of Romania to be ousted through a motion of no confidence.

Romanian President Klaus Iohannis reacted to the result of the vote by saying that the word "crisis" describes "present-day Romania" the best. Negotiations and talks with the president on forming the government to replace the Cîțu Cabinet are expected to start a week after the fall of the government led by Florin Cîțu.

Reuters journalist Radu Marinas considers that the most likely outcome for the next government is a restored PNL-USR-UDMR/RMDSZ coalition, having a Prime Minister other than Florin Cîțu, since an early election would be unlikely, due to it requiring the Parliament of Romania two prime minister proposals from the President of Romania in a time period of 60 days. (Note: Article 89, Section 1 of the Constitution of Romania states that the president can dissolve parliament only after two governments had been rejected and no government was formed in a time frame of 60 days, after consulting the presidents of the chambers of Parliament.) Nonetheless, the PNL began negotiations with the major opposition Social Democratic Party (PSD) for a new coalition together with the UDMR, which were closed on 21 November 2021, with the next cabinet, the Ciucă Cabinet, being sworn in on 25 November.

== Composition ==
Position	Minister	Party	Date sworn in	Left office
Prime Minister (Romanian: prim-ministru)	Florin Cîțu	PNL	23 December 2020	25 November 2021
Deputy Prime Minister (Romanian: viceprim-ministru)	Dan Barna	USR	23 December 2020	7 September 2021
Deputy Prime Minister (Romanian: viceprim-ministru)	Hunor Kelemen	UDMR/RMDSZ	23 December 2020	25 November 2021
Minister of Foreign Affairs (Romanian: Ministrul Afacerilor Externe)	Bogdan Aurescu	Independent	23 December 2020	25 November 2021
Minister of Internal Affairs (Romanian: Ministrul Afacerilor Interne)	Lucian Bode	PNL	23 December 2020	25 November 2021
Minister of Agriculture and Rural Development (Romanian: Ministrul Agriculturii și Dezvoltării Rurale)	Nechita-Adrian Oros	PNL	23 December 2020	28 September 2021
Minister of National Defence (Romanian: Ministrul Apărării Naționale)	Nicolae Ciucă	PNL	23 December 2020	25 November 2021
Minister of Research, Innovation and Digitalization (Romanian: Ministrul Cercetării, Inovării și Digitalizării)	Ciprian Teleman	PLUS	23 December 2020	7 September 2021
Minister of Research, Innovation and Digitalization (Romanian: Ministrul Cercetării, Inovării și Digitalizării)	Barna Tánczos (acting)	UDMR/RMDSZ	8 September 2021	25 November 2021
Minister of Culture (Romanian: Ministrul Culturii)	Bogdan Gheorghiu	PNL	23 December 2020	25 November 2021
Minister for Development, Public Works and Administration (Romanian: Ministrul Dezvoltării, Lucrărilor Publice și Administrației)	Attila Cseke	UDMR/RMDSZ	23 December 2020	25 November 2021
Minister of Education (Romanian: Ministrul Educației)	Sorin Cîmpeanu	PNL	23 December 2020	25 November 2021
Minister of Energy (Romanian: Ministrul Energiei)	Virgil-Daniel Popescu	PNL	23 December 2020	25 November 2021
Minister of Economy, Entrepreneurship and Tourism (Romanian: Ministrul Economiei, Antreprenoriatului și Turismului)	Claudiu Năsui	USR	23 December 2020	7 September 2021
Minister of Economy, Entrepreneurship and Tourism (Romanian: Ministrul Economiei, Antreprenoriatului și Turismului)	Virgil Popescu (acting)	PNL	8 September 2021	25 November 2021
Minister of Labour and Social Protection (Romanian: Ministrul Muncii și Protecției Sociale)	Raluca Turcan	PNL	23 December 2020	25 November 2021
Minister of Environment, Water and Forests (Romanian: Ministrul Mediului, Apelor și Pădurilor)	Barna Tánczos	UDMR/RMDSZ	23 December 2020	25 November 2021
Minister for Transport and Infrastructure (Romanian: Ministrul Transporturilor și Infrastructurii)	Cătălin Drulă	USR	23 December 2020	7 September 2021
Minister for Transport and Infrastructure (Romanian: Ministrul Transporturilor și Infrastructurii)	Dan Vîlceanu (acting)	PNL	8 September 2021	25 November 2021
Minister of Finance (Romanian: Ministrul Finanțelor)	Alexandru Nazare	PNL	23 December 2020	8 July 2021
Minister of Finance (Romanian: Ministrul Finanțelor)	Florin Cîțu (acting)	PNL	8 July 2021	18 August 2021
Minister of Finance (Romanian: Ministrul Finanțelor)	Dan Vîlceanu	PNL	18 August 2021	25 November 2021
Minister of Justice (Romanian: Ministrul Justiției)	Stelian Ion	USR	23 December 2020	1 September 2021
Minister of Justice (Romanian: Ministrul Justiției)	Lucian Bode (acting)	PNL	1 September 2021	25 November 2021
Minister of Health (Romanian: Ministrul Sănătății)	Vlad Voiculescu	PLUS	23 December 2020	14 April 2021
Minister of Health (Romanian: Ministrul Sănătății)	Florin Cîțu (acting)	PNL	14 April 2021	21 April 2021
Minister of Health (Romanian: Ministrul Sănătății)	Ioana Mihăilă	PLUS	21 April 2021	7 September 2021
Minister of Health (Romanian: Ministrul Sănătății)	Attila Cseke (acting)	UDMR/RMDSZ	8 September 2021	25 November 2021
Minister of Investments and European Projects (Romanian: Ministrul Investițiilor și Proiectelor Europene)	Cristian Ghinea	USR	23 December 2020	7 September 2021
Minister of Investments and European Projects (Romanian: Ministrul Investițiilor și Proiectelor Europene)	Florin Cîțu (acting)	PNL	8 September 2021	25 November 2021
Minister for Youth and Sport (Romanian: Ministrul Tineretului și Sportului)	Eduard Novak	UDMR/RMDSZ	23 December 2020	25 November 2021

=== Party breakdown ===
Party breakdown of cabinet ministers:

==== Formation ====
- National Liberal Party
  8 / 18
- Save Romania Union
  4 / 18
- Democratic Alliance of Hungarians in Romania
  3 / 18
- Freedom, Unity and Solidarity Party
  2 / 18
- Independent
  1 / 18

==== End term ====
- National Liberal Party (PNL)
  12 / 18
- Democratic Alliance of Hungarians in Romania (UDMR/RMDSZ)
  5 / 18
- Independent
  1 / 18
