= Stelian Ion =

Romanian politician (born 1977)

Stelian-Cristian Ion
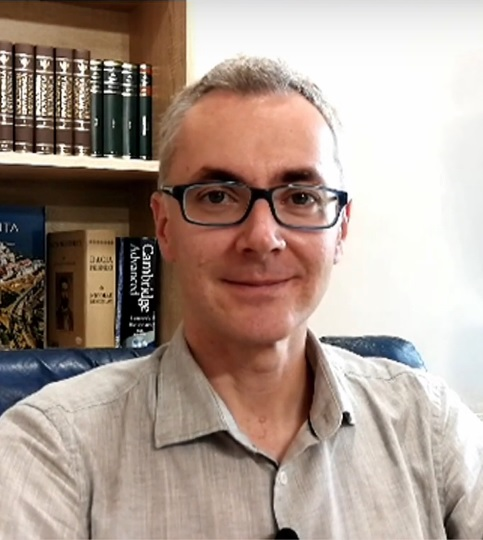
- Stelian-Cristian Ion in 2020

Minister of Justice
- In office 23 December 2020 – 1 September 2021
- Prime Minister: Florin Cîțu
- Preceded by: Cătălin Predoiu
- Succeeded by: Lucian Bode (Acting)

Personal details
- Born: 24 June 1977 (age 49) Constanța, Constanța County, Romania
- Party: Save Romania Union (USR)
- Education: University of Bucharest

Stelian-Cristian Ion (born 24 June 1977) is a Romanian politician who served as Minister of Justice in the Cîțu Cabinet, led by Prime Minister Florin Cîțu, from 23 December 2020 to 1 September 2021.

His sacking as Minister of Justice threatened the survival of Florin Cîțu's coalition government, especially with the withdrawal of USR PLUS party members and two motions of no confidence filed in less than a month, leading to a almost three-month long major political crisis in Romania.

== Electoral history ==
=== Mayor of Constanța ===
Election	Affiliation	Main round		
Election	Affiliation	Votes	Percentage	Position
2020	2020 USR-PLUS Alliance	23,523	24.31%	2nd
2024	United Right Alliance	21.889	20.76%	2nd

Political offices
Preceded by Cătălin Predoiu	Minister of Justice; 2020–2021	Succeeded by Lucian Bode; Acting
