= First Orban cabinet =

Orban Cabinet
- 129th Cabinet of Romania

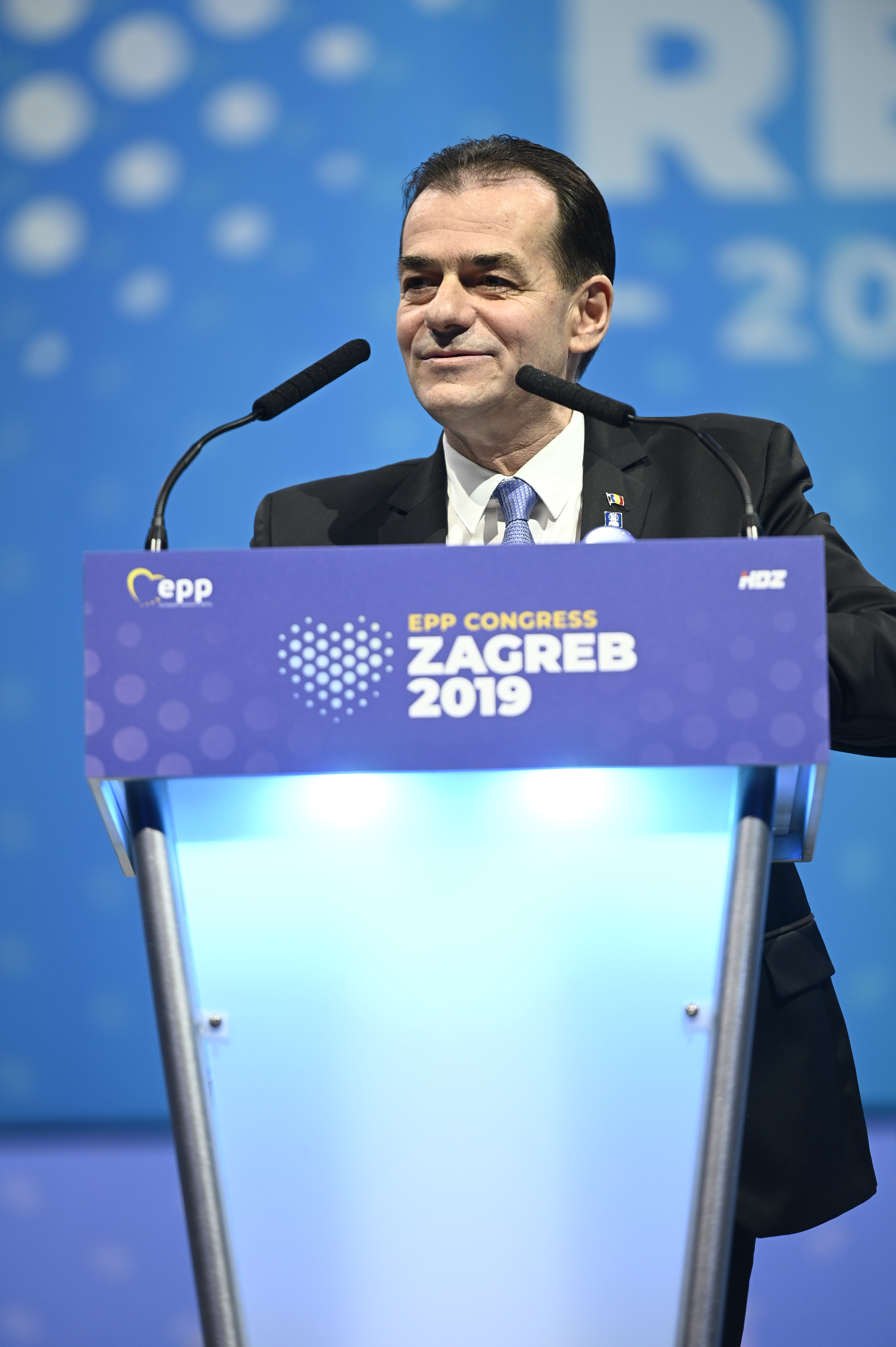
- Ludovic Orban
- Date formed: 4 November 2019
- Date dissolved: 14 March 2020

People and organisations
- Head of state: Klaus Iohannis
- Head of government: Ludovic Orban
- Deputy head of government: Raluca Turcan
- No. of ministers: 18
- Member parties: PNL
- Status in legislature: Minority with confidence and supply from the UDMR, USR, ALDE, PMP and Minority parties
- Opposition parties: PSD (majority); PRO (majority)
- Opposition leaders: Marcel Ciolacu; Victor Ponta

History
- Outgoing election: 2020
- Legislature term: 2016–2020
- Predecessor: Dăncilă
- Successor: Orban II

The First Orban cabinet was the government of Romania until 14 March 2020. It was a minority administration led by Ludovic Orban, the leader of the National Liberal Party (PNL), who received the support of a parliamentary majority on 4 November 2019 and entered office the same day. It included a confidence-and-supply agreement with the Save Romania Union (USR) and the Democratic Alliance of Hungarians in Romania (UDMR/RMDSZ), as well as other smaller parties (including, most notably, People's Movement Party or PMP for short).

On 5 February 2020, a no-confidence vote to dissolve the Orban Cabinet was adopted in Parliament with 261 votes in favour and 139 against. According to the Constitution of Romania, this cabinet continued to serve as the Government of Romania until the date the next cabinet was sworn in.

Position	Minister	Party	Date sworn in	Left office
Prime Minister	Ludovic Orban	PNL	4 November 2019	14 March 2020
Deputy Prime Minister	Raluca Turcan	PNL	4 November 2019	14 March 2020
Minister of Education and Research	Monica Anisie	PNL	4 November 2019	14 March 2020
Minister for Economy, Energy and the Business Environment	Virgil-Daniel Popescu	PNL	4 November 2019	14 March 2020
Minister of Foreign Affairs	Bogdan Aurescu	Independent	4 November 2019	14 March 2020
Minister of Defence	Nicolae Ciucă	Independent	4 November 2019	14 March 2020
Minister of Labour and Social Protection	Violeta Alexandru	PNL	4 November 2019	14 March 2020
Minister for Public Works, Development and Administration	Ion Ștefan	PNL	4 November 2019	14 March 2020
Minister for Environment, Waters and Forests	Costel Alexe	PNL	4 November 2019	14 March 2020
Minister for Transport, Information and Communications	Lucian Bode	PNL	4 November 2019	14 March 2020
Minister of Public Finance	Florin Cîțu	PNL	4 November 2019	14 March 2020
Minister of Justice	Cătălin Predoiu	PNL	4 November 2019	14 March 2020
Minister of Agriculture and Rural Development	Nechita-Adrian Oros	PNL	4 November 2019	14 March 2020
Minister of Health	Victor Costache	PNL	4 November 2019	14 March 2020
Minister of Internal Affairs	Marcel Vela	PNL	4 November 2019	14 March 2020
Minister of European Funds	Ioan-Marcel Boloș	PNL	4 November 2019	14 March 2020
Minister of Culture	Bogdan Gheorghiu	PNL	4 November 2019	14 March 2020
Minister of Youth and Sports	Ionuț Stroe	PNL	4 November 2019	14 March 2020
