= Second Orban cabinet =

Government of Romania until the 2020 legislative elections

Orban Cabinet
- 130th Cabinet of Romania

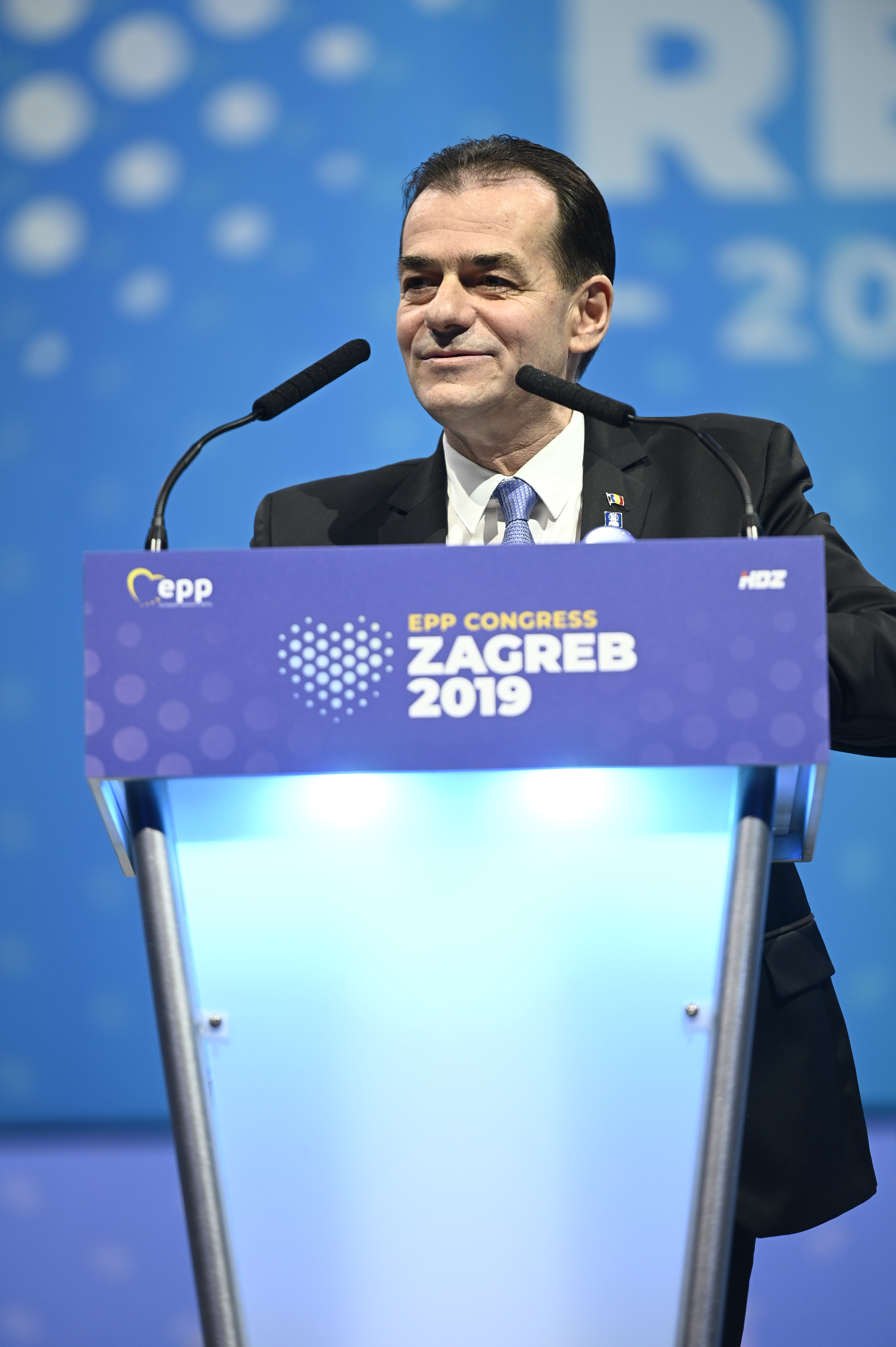
- Ludovic Orban
- Date formed: 14 March 2020
- Date dissolved: 23 December 2020

People and organisations
- Head of state: Klaus Iohannis
- Head of government: Ludovic Orban
- Deputy head of government: Raluca Turcan
- No. of ministers: 18
- Member parties: PNL
- Status in legislature: Minority with confidence and supply from the UDMR, USR, ALDE, PMP and Minority parties
- Opposition parties: PSD (majority); PRO (majority)
- Opposition leaders: Marcel Ciolacu; Victor Ponta

History
- Outgoing election: 2020
- Legislature term: 2016–2020
- Predecessor: Orban I
- Successor: Cîțu

The Second Orban cabinet was the government of Romania until the 2020 legislative elections. It was a minority administration led by Ludovic Orban, the leader of the National Liberal Party (PNL), who received the support of a parliamentary majority on 14 March 2020 and entered office the same day. It included a wide de facto confidence-and-supply with the other parties, in the outbreak of the COVID-19 pandemic.

On 14 March 2020, the cabinet hearings and vote took place in special conditions, due to the suspicion that Senator Vergil Chițac [ro], who tested positive for COVID-19, infected the National Liberal Party (PNL) leadership, as well as some fellow senators. The same day the Cabinet was sworn in at Cotroceni Palace in special conditions.

Position	Minister	Party	Date sworn in	Left office
Prime Minister	Ludovic Orban	PNL	14 March 2020	7 December 2020
Prime Minister	Nicolae Ciucă (acting/ad interim)	PNL	7 December 2020	23 December 2020
Deputy Prime Minister	Raluca Turcan	PNL	14 March 2020	23 December 2020
Minister of Education and Research	Monica Anisie	PNL	14 March 2020	23 December 2020
Minister for Economy, Energy and the Business Environment	Virgil-Daniel Popescu	PNL	14 March 2020	23 December 2020
Minister of Foreign Affairs	Bogdan Aurescu	Independent	14 March 2020	23 December 2020
Minister of Defence	Nicolae Ciucă	PNL	14 March 2020	23 December 2020
Minister of Labour and Social Protection	Violeta Alexandru	PNL	14 March 2020	23 December 2020
Minister for Public Works, Development and Administration	Ion Ștefan	PNL	14 March 2020	23 December 2020
Minister for Environment, Waters and Forests	Costel Alexe	PNL	14 March 2020	5 November 2020
Minister for Environment, Waters and Forests	Mircea Fechet	PNL	5 November 2020	23 December 2020
Minister for Transport, Information and Communications	Lucian Bode	PNL	14 March 2020	23 December 2020
Minister of Public Finance	Florin Cîțu	PNL	14 March 2020	23 December 2020
Minister of Justice	Cătălin Predoiu	PNL	14 March 2020	23 December 2020
Minister of Agriculture and Rural Development	Nechita-Adrian Oros	PNL	14 March 2020	23 December 2020
Minister of Health	Victor Costache	PNL	14 March 2020	26 March 2020
Minister of Health	Nelu Tătaru	PNL	26 March 2020	23 December 2020
Minister of Internal Affairs	Marcel Vela	PNL	14 March 2020	23 December 2020
Minister of European Funds	Ioan-Marcel Boloș	PNL	14 March 2020	23 December 2020
Minister of Culture	Bogdan Gheorghiu	PNL	14 March 2020	23 December 2020
Minister of Youth and Sports	Ionuț Stroe	PNL	14 March 2020	23 December 2020
