= Florin Cîțu =

Prime Minister of Romania from 2020 to 2021

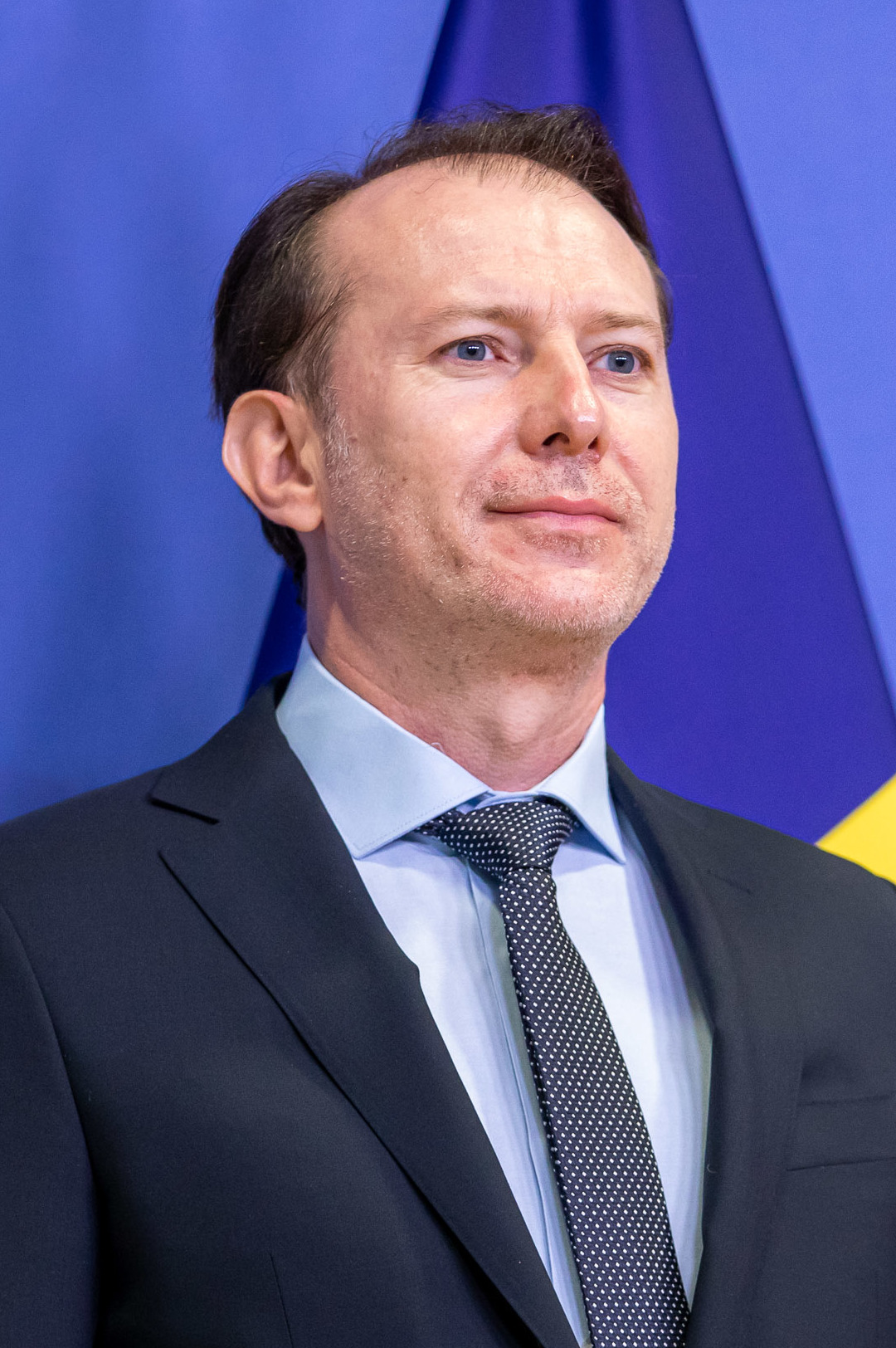
- Cîțu in 2021

President of the Senate of Romania
- In office 23 November 2021 – 29 June 2022
- Preceded by: Anca Dragu
- Succeeded by: Alina Gorghiu (Acting)

Prime Minister of Romania
- In office 23 December 2020 – 25 November 2021
- President: Klaus Iohannis
- Deputy: Dan Barna (2020–2021); Kelemen Hunor
- Preceded by: Ludovic Orban; Nicolae Ciucă (Acting)
- Succeeded by: Nicolae Ciucă

President of the National Liberal Party
- In office 25 September 2021 – 2 April 2022
- Preceded by: Ludovic Orban
- Succeeded by: Gheorghe Flutur (Acting)

Minister of Public Finance
- In office 4 November 2019 – 23 December 2020
- Prime Minister: Ludovic Orban; Nicolae Ciucă (Acting)
- Preceded by: Eugen Teodorovici
- Succeeded by: Alexandru Nazare
- In office 8 July 2021 – 18 August 2021
- Prime Minister: Himself
- Preceded by: Alexandru Nazare
- Succeeded by: Dan Vîlceanu

Member of the Senate of Romania
- In office 21 December 2016 – 20 December 2024
- Constituency: Bucharest
Other ministerial offices
Minister of Health
Acting
In office 14 April 2021 – 21 April 2021
Prime Minister	Himself
Preceded by	Vlad Voiculescu
Succeeded by	Ioana Mihăilă
Minister of European Funds
Acting
In office 6 September 2021 – 25 November 2021
Prime Minister	Himself
Preceded by	Cristian Ghinea
Succeeded by	Dan Vîlceanu

Personal details
- Born: Florin Vasile Cîțu; 1 April 1972 (age 54) Râmnicu Vâlcea, Vâlcea County, Romania
- Party: National Liberal Party (PNL)
- Education: Grinnell College (BA); Iowa State University (MA)
- Website: Official website

Florin Vasile Cîțu (Note: Romanian pronunciation: [floˈrin vaˈsile ˈkɨt͡su]) (born 1 April 1972) is a Romanian politician who served as Prime Minister of Romania from December 2020 to November 2021 (acting/ad interim between October and November 2021). Sometimes labeled as Romania's first right-libertarian Prime Minister, he was also the leader of the National Liberal Party (PNL) between September 2021 and April 2022.

After a motion of no confidence ended his premiership, Cîțu was voted President of the Senate of Romania by the new CNR coalition government established in the Parliament. However, he resigned from this office also in June 2022, after the same coalition withdrew its support for him. Previously, he also served as Minister of Public Finance in both the first and second cabinet of former PNL Prime Minister Ludovic Orban between 2019 and 2020.

== Personal life ==
Florin Cîțu was born in Râmnicu Vâlcea, although he grew up in the village of Tulei-Câmpeni from Golești commune in Vâlcea County, Oltenia. He was the second ever Prime Minister of Romania from Vâlcea County, after the CDR-supported Mugur Isărescu (a native of Drăgășani).

While abroad for his bachelor studies in the United States at Grinnell College, Cîțu was arrested after being found drunk or under the influence of alcohol while driving DWI and DUI by the American police. He was fined 1,300 USD and jailed for two days.

== Education ==
After graduating from Grinnell College in 1996, Cîțu obtained a master's degree in economics and attended the program for a doctoral degree that he did not complete in macroeconomics and international economics from Iowa State University in 2001.

== Early career ==
Following university graduation, Cîțu worked as an economist for the Reserve Bank of New Zealand (2001–2003) and the European Investment Bank (2003–2005). He also worked as an investment banker at ING Group's Romanian division up until 2011, when he was fired on the grounds of incompetence and because of lack of professionalism given that he proved incapable of working well in teams (preferring to do whatever he wanted instead), as subsequently reported by his employer Mișu Negrițoiu who went on to describe him as 'a little satrap'.

== Political career ==
=== Minister of Finance ===
In 2019, the joint budget and finance committee of the Parliament of Romania failed to endorse the nomination of Cîțu as finance minister, though their vote was not binding.

On 26 February 2020, following the vote of no confidence against the Orban cabinet that had taken place 5 February, President Klaus Iohannis designated Cîțu Prime Minister of Romania and asked him to form a new government. Just before the investiture vote took place, Cîțu stepped back in favor of his party leader Ludovic Orban. Due to the emerging COVID-19 pandemic, the main opposition party, i.e. the Social Democratic Party (PSD), agreed to another term of the Orban cabinet until the December 2020 legislative election. Consequently, Florin Cîțu took back his position as finance minister until the formation of his own cabinet in late December 2020.

=== Prime minister ===
After 9 December 2020, Cîțu was the National Liberal Party's prime minister proposal to succeed acting head of government Nicolae Ciucă (also issued from the PNL), following the resignation of Ludovic Orban on 7 December. Cîțu became prime minister on 23 December, forming a three-party coalition government. The composition of his cabinet was criticised for having only one female minister and for the appointment of Sorin Cîmpeanu, who in a previous ministerial position had proposed legislation "that protected those found to have plagiarised their academic theses".

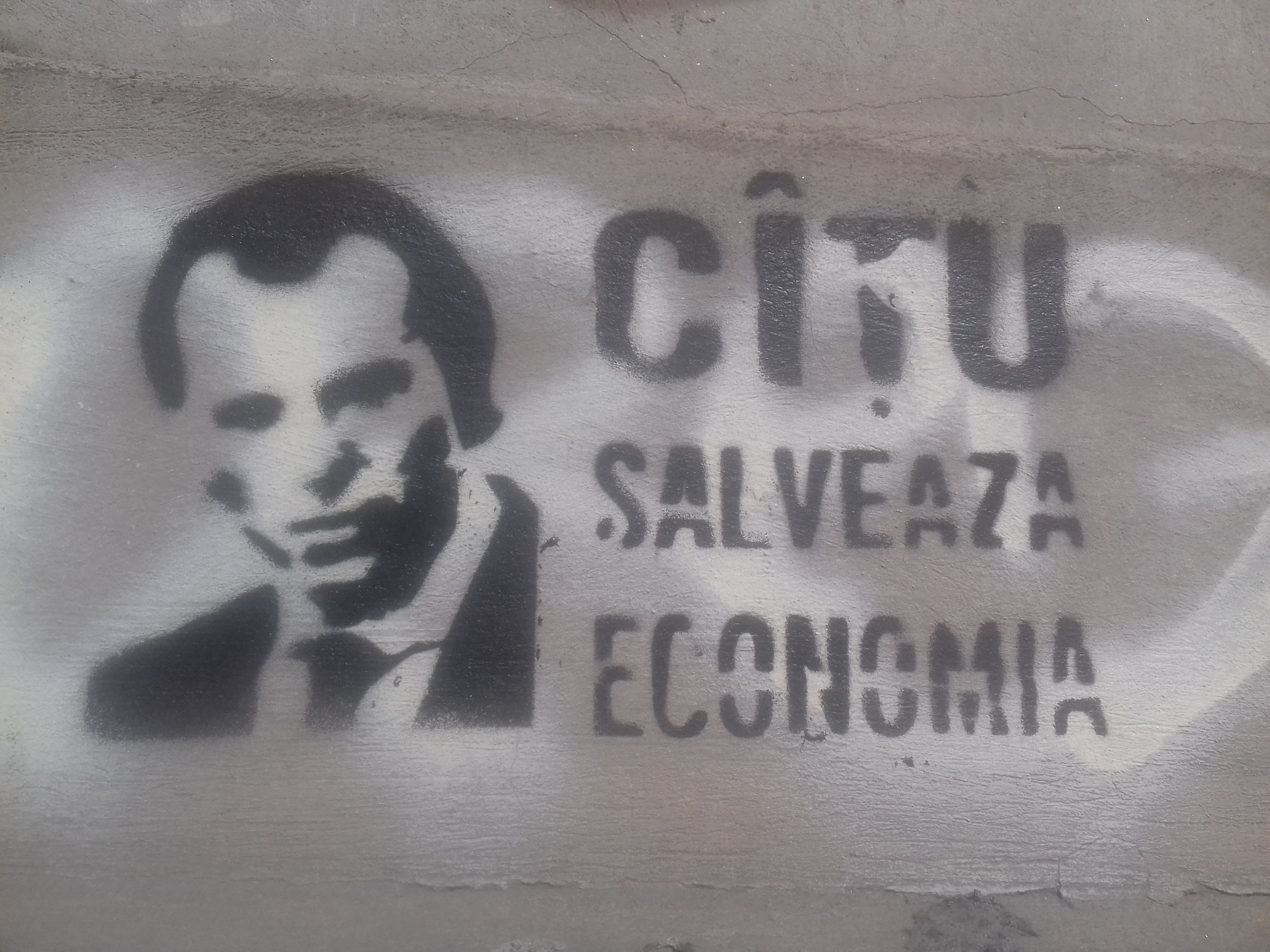
Florin Cîțu graffiti in Bucharest

During the term of his cabinet, he served as acting Minister of Health (between 14 and 21 April 2021) as a result of the firing of preceding Minister Vlad Voiculescu. On 8 July, he took back the position of Minister of Public Finance for a second time after preceding Minister Alexandru Nazare was ousted, this time acting, until Dan Vîlceanu was sworn in on 18 August.

In September 2021, the coalition was threatened by the withdrawal of USR PLUS party members, following the sacking on no pertinent reported grounds of former Justice Minister, Stelian Ion. The USR PLUS entered parliamentary opposition and put forth a motion of no confidence alongside AUR, thus triggering a major governmental crisis in Romania, which was already hit hard by the fourth wave of the ongoing COVID-19 pandemic.

His former coalition partners, USR PLUS, heavily criticized Cîțu for the adoption of PNDL3 and Anghel Saligny projects through emergency ordinances, two public procurement money-based projects which they deemed corrupt and thereby legitimizing theft from public money and EU funds. Subsequently, Cîțu's position as prime minister has been backed by a boycotting of the no confidence motion by both PNL and PSD up to the current day.

In the meantime, his own political party has been swept from public trust (constantly registering lower points in the opinion polls conducted by various institutes for the upcoming legislative elections) and has undergone increased internal turmoil with respect to the congress scheduled for 25 September. In addition, in late September 2021, DNA officially started the criminal investigation in Florin Cîțu's case on the grounds of abuse of office and incitement to abuse of office as prime minister.

On 5 October 2021, Cîțu was ousted from his position as Prime Minister after a vote of no-confidence. Former coalition partners USR (previously USR PLUS) described the vote as stemming from "all the reforms that have been blocked in recent months, for the failure of the vaccination campaign, for the use of money and public functions to buy votes at the PNL congress". After the successful vote of no-confidence, Cîțu continued to serve as acting/ad interim prime minister until the next cabinet, led by Nicolae Ciucă, was sworn in a month later.

=== President of the National Liberal Party (PNL) ===
On 25 September 2021, Cîțu became president of the National Liberal Party (PNL), as a result of defeating previous party president Ludovic Orban in a party congress held on the same day at Romexpo in Bucharest before approximately 5,000 delegates.

Cîțu resigned from this position on 2 April 2022, under pressure from his party colleagues.

=== President of the Senate ===
On 23 November 2021, Cîțu became president of the Senate, after Anca Dragu of the Save Romania Union (USR) was dismissed earlier that day. In this capacity he visited Ukraine in April 2022, in the context of the Russian invasion, after the invitation of the Chairman of the Verkhovna Rada, Ruslan Stefanchuk. Cîțu met with President Volodymyr Zelenskyy and Prime Minister Denys Shmyhal and held a speech as part of the Congress of Local and Regional Authorities. After visiting Hostomel, Irpin and Bucha, which have been heavily damaged by the aggression, Cîțu strongly condemned the war crimes committed by the Russian army, and highlighted that Russia must pay Ukraine war reparations for the massive damage caused. He also said that Romania should officially propose to the European Commission the establishment of a special position, to coordinate with the Ukrainian side the reconstruction of this country. His visit in Ukraine led to the 2022 cyberattacks on Romania, when a pro-Kremlin hacking group launched a series of DDoS attacks against multiple Romanian websites, including governmental ones.

Cîțu resigned from this office on 29 June 2022. As with the PNL presidency, he was pressured to take this step by the PNL leadership (led by Prime Minister Nicolae Ciucă) that succeeded him, who withdrew party support for Cîțu after he criticized the actions of the government led by Ciucă. This was the last remaining political office held by Cîțu.

== Other activities ==
- ING Bank Romanian division, investment banker up until 2011, when he was fired.
- European Bank for Reconstruction and Development (EBRD), Ex-Officio Member of the Board of Governors (since 2019)
- European Investment Bank (EIB), Ex-Officio Member of the Board of Governors (since 2019)
- World Bank, Ex-Officio Member of the Board of Governors (since 2019)

=== Published work ===
- 2006 - "Inflation Targeting: what are the crucial issues in practice?" (with Olivier Basdevant) published in the book Trends in Monetary Policy Issues, New Science Publishers
- 2005 - "Effects of Capital Account liberalisation – The case of Romania"
- 2003 - "Inflation Targeting: what are the crucial issues in practice?" (with Olivier Basdevant) Policy Paper National Bank of Romania.
- 2003 - "The output gap and its role in monetary policy decision-making" (with James Twaddle), published RBNZ Bulletin
- 2002 - "Inflation targeting vs. Price Level Targeting", Reserve Bank New Zealand Bulletin

=== Foreign honours ===
- Ukraine: Order of Merit, 1st class

== See also ==
- Cîțu Cabinet

Political offices
Preceded by Eugen Teodorovici	Minister of Public Finance; 2019–2020	Succeeded by Alexandru Nazare
Preceded by Nicolae Ciucă; Acting	Prime Minister of Romania; 2020–2021	Succeeded by Nicolae Ciucă
Preceded by Anca Dragu	President of the Romanian Senate; 2021–2022	Succeeded by Alina Gorghiu; Acting
Party political offices
Preceded by Ludovic Orban	Leader of the National Liberal Party; 2021–2022	Succeeded by Gheorghe Flutur; Acting
