= Nicolae Ciucă =

Prime Minister of Romania from 2021 to 2023

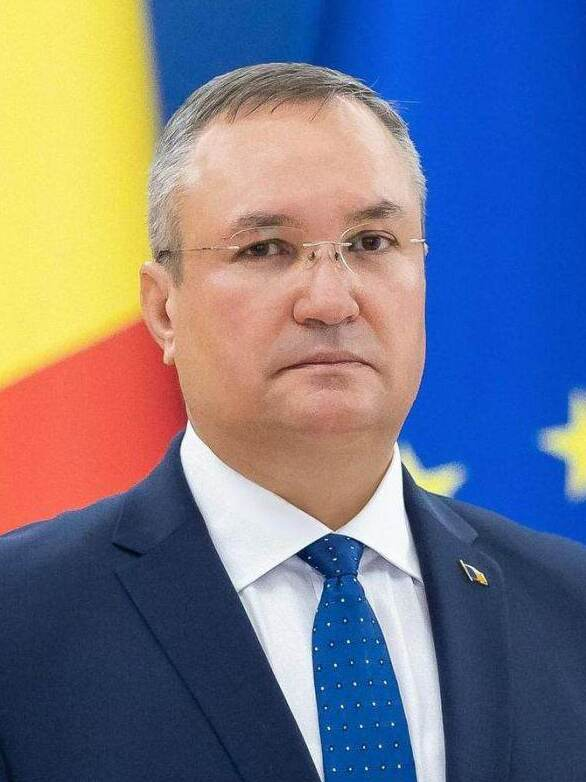
- Ciucă in 2021

Prime Minister of Romania
- In office 25 November 2021 – 12 June 2023
- President: Klaus Iohannis
- Deputy: Hunor Kelemen; Sorin Grindeanu
- Preceded by: Florin Cîțu
- Succeeded by: Cătălin Predoiu (acting) Marcel Ciolacu
- Acting; 7 December 2020 – 23 December 2020
- President: Klaus Iohannis
- Deputy: Raluca Turcan
- Preceded by: Ludovic Orban
- Succeeded by: Florin Cîțu

President of the Senate of Romania
- In office 13 June 2023 – 23 December 2024
- Preceded by: Alina Gorghiu (acting)
- Succeeded by: Ilie Bolojan

Minister of National Defence
- In office 4 November 2019 – 25 November 2021
- Prime Minister: Ludovic Orban; Himself; Florin Cîțu
- Preceded by: Gabriel-Beniamin Leș
- Succeeded by: Vasile Dîncu

President of the National Liberal Party
- In office 10 April 2022 – 25 November 2024
- Preceded by: Gheorghe Flutur (acting)
- Succeeded by: Ilie Bolojan

Senator of Romania
- In office 21 December 2020 – 5 February 2025
- Constituency: Dolj County

Chief of the Romanian General Staff
- In office 1 January 2015 – 28 October 2019
- President: Klaus Iohannis
- Preceded by: Ștefan Dănilă
- Succeeded by: Daniel Petrescu

Personal details
- Born: Nicolae Ionel Ciucă; 7 February 1967 (age 59) Plenița, Dolj County, Socialist Republic of Romania
- Party: National Liberal Party (2020–present)
- Other political affiliations: Romanian Communist Party (1986—1989)
- Spouse: Cristina Maria Ciucă
- Children: 1
- Awards: Ordre national du Mérite, Commander rank; National Order of Merit (Romania), Commander rank; Order of the Star of Romania, Officer rank; Legion of Merit

Military service
- Branch/service: Romanian Land Forces
- Years of service: 1988–2019
- Rank: General
- Commands: 26th Infantry Battalion "Red Scorpions"; Chief of the Romanian General Staff
- Battles/wars: War in Afghanistan; Iraq War

Nicolae Ionel Ciucă (Note: Romanian pronunciation: [nikoˈla.e joˈnel ˈtʃjukə]) (born 22 September 1967) is a former Romanian politician and retired general of the Romanian Land Forces. Ideologically a conservative, he served as Prime Minister of Romania between 25 November 2021 and 12 June 2023 after receiving widespread parliamentary support on behalf of his own party, the National Liberal Party (PNL) along with the Social Democratic Party (PSD) and the Democratic Alliance of Hungarians in Romania (UDMR/RMDSZ). From 10 April 2022 until his resignation on 25 November 2024, he has served as the president of the National Liberal Party (PNL). On 12 June 2023, he resigned as prime minister, as part of a deal with his coalition partner, the PSD, to switch places with Marcel Ciolacu, and was temporarily replaced by Cătălin Predoiu.

Ciucă has participated in the wars in Afghanistan and Iraq. He was the Chief of the Romanian General Staff from 2015 to 2019, and from 2019 to 2021 was the Minister of Defence. He briefly led as caretaker the Romanian government between 7 and 23 December 2020, in the aftermath of former prime minister Ludovic Orban's resignation. On 21 October 2021, he was appointed by President Klaus Iohannis to form a new government following the dissolution of the Cîțu Cabinet and the rejection of Dacian Cioloș as prime minister but subsequently gave up his mandate. Iohannis nominated him again on 22 November 2021.

== Early life and education ==
Nicolae Ciucă was born in Plenița, a commune in Dolj County, on 7 February 1967. He graduated from the Tudor Vladimirescu Military Lyceum in Craiova in 1985 and from the Nicolae Bălcescu Land Forces Academy in Sibiu in 1988.

== Military career ==
During his military career, he participated in missions in Afghanistan, Bosnia and Herzegovina, and Iraq. From 2001 to 2004, he was commander of the 26th Infantry Battalion (also known as the Red Scorpions), with which he participated in Operation Enduring Freedom in Afghanistan and Operation Ancient Babylon in Iraq. He was promoted to the rank of General on 25 October 2010.

In 2015, he replaced Ștefan Dănilă as Chief of the Romanian General Staff. His 4-year term under this office was extended for another year by the Romanian President Klaus Iohannis in 2018. This caused a conflict between Iohannis, the Prime Minister Viorica Dăncilă, and the then Minister of Defense, Gabriel-Beniamin Leș, who intended to change office.

== Political career ==
On 28 October 2024, Ciucă admitted that he joined the Romanian Communist Party in 1986, but claimed that every military officer had to do that and that he wasn't a communist.

The National Liberal Party (PNL) proposed Ciucă as Minister of Defense of the First Orban cabinet. He was transferred as a reserve on 28 October 2019, being succeeded as Chief of the Romanian General Staff by Daniel Petrescu. He became the Minister of Defense of Romania on 4 November 2019. In October 2020, he joined the National Liberal Party (PNL) to run as a senator for the Senate of Romania in that year's legislative elections and was subsequently elected as well.

On 7 December 2020, following the resignation of Prime Minister Ludovic Orban, he was named acting prime minister by Iohannis. He led as caretaker the government until a new coalition government was formed under Florin Cîțu on 23 December as a consequence of the result of the 2020 Romanian legislative election.

However, after the Cîțu Cabinet was dissolved through a motion of no confidence on 5 October 2021, Iohannis nominated Ciucă as Prime Minister-designate on 21 October 2021. While the Democratic Alliance of Hungarians in Romania (UDMR/RMDSZ) quickly agreed to renew a minority government with the PNL, the Social Democratic Party (PSD) offered to support him temporarily during the COVID-19 pandemic in exchange for agreeing to 10 measures. He presented his government on 29 October. Having failed to win the support of the PSD or the Save Romania Union (USR), he gave up forming a government on 1 November. He was nominated again as Prime Minister-designate on 22 November 2021 and was confirmed by the parliament on 25 November after receiving 318 votes in favor. He was sworn in the office hours later.

After Florin Cîțu resigned as president of the National Liberal Party (PNL) on 2 April 2022, followed by an 8-day ad interim leadership of Gheorghe Flutur, Ciucă was elected as the new party leader. He is the third consecutive politician since 2019 to serve as both prime minister and president of the PNL at one point, the first two being Orban and Cîțu.

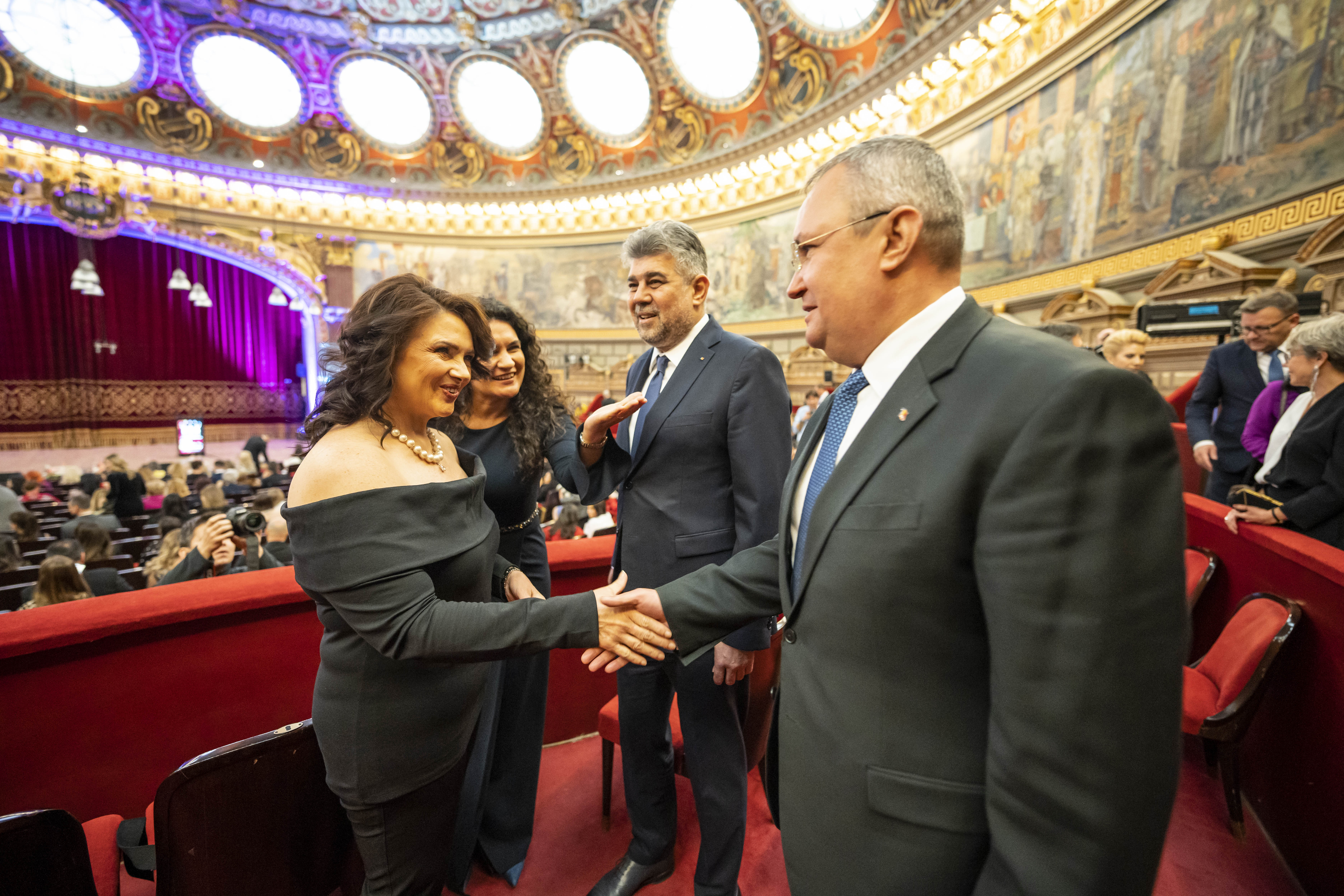
Ciucă (right) meeting European Commissioner for Equality Helena Dalli (left) during a feminist conference in Bucharest on 6 March 2023

On 26 August 2022, Ciucă signed the first financing contracts of the so-called Anghel Saligny investment program, a foundation whose purpose is to develop settlements for Romanian civilians, formally created as a result of the 2021 Romanian political crisis. Since the investment of the Ciucă-led CNR cabinet, Romania has experienced a shift towards authoritarianism and illiberalism.

In March 2023, Ciucă introduced an artificial intelligence assistant, an "honorary advisor" known as ION, which aims to scan social networks to inform the government of the Romanian people's wishes and opinions. Following the introduction, Nicu Sebe, the coordinator of the research team behind ION, revealed that the event was staged with the AI being unable to generate responses; instead, there was a human operator responsible for selecting pre-prepared responses to anticipated questions. Besides this, it was revealed that out of the 500,000 messages that ION got, only the positive ones were published, with the rest being filtered out.

On 12 June 2023, according to the protocol of the CNR, Ciucă resigned. He was replaced as prime minister by Marcel Ciolacu. He became the President of the Senate of Romania on 13 June 2023.

Under Ciucă's premiership, Romania experienced democratic backsliding, with The Economist ranking it last in the European Union in the world terms of democracy, even behind Viktor Orbán's Hungary.

== Awards ==
Ciucă is the recipient of the Ordre national du Mérite of the French Republic, Commander rank, and of the National Order of Merit of Romania, Commander rank. In 2019, he was awarded the Order of the Star of Romania, Officer rank. In 2020, he was awarded the Legion of Merit by U.S. Ambassador Adrian Zuckerman.

== Controversies ==
=== Plagiarism ===
Nicolae Ciucă has been accused of plagiarizing his PhD thesis by the independent news organization PressOne. Following a year and a half-long investigation, the organization was able to transcribe and digitalize his thesis, "The dimension of the Romanian army's engagement in multinational joint operations", finding that multiple pages of his work were copied, word for word, from other works without the texts correctly attributed to the original authors and lacking the requisite quotation marks, as required by academic norms. During the investigation, journalist Emilia Șercan discovered that at least 42 out of the 138 pages in the doctorate thesis were plagiarized and that 94.2% of the plagiarized content in Prime Minister Nicolae Ciucă's thesis originates from non-digitized works, which could not be detected using anti-plagiarizing software. Nicolae Ciucă denied the accusations, stating they "cannot be scientifically proven."

== Personal life ==
Ciucă is married and has a child.

== Political views ==
Ciucă opposes same-sex marriage as well as civil unions.

== See also ==
- Orban I Cabinet
- Orban II Cabinet
- Cîțu Cabinet
- Ciucă Cabinet

Military offices
Preceded by Ștefan Dănilă	Chief of the Romanian General Staff; 2015–2019	Succeeded by Daniel Petrescu
Political offices
Preceded by Gabriel-Beniamin Leș	Minister of National Defence; 2019–2021	Succeeded by Vasile Dîncu
Preceded by Ludovic Orban	Prime Minister of Romania; Acting; 2020	Succeeded by Florin Cîțu
Preceded by Florin Cîțu	Prime Minister of Romania; 2021–2023	Succeeded by Cătălin Predoiu; Acting
Preceded by Alina Gorghiu; Acting	President of the Senate of Romania; 2023–2024	Succeeded by Ilie Bolojan
Party political offices
Preceded by Gheorghe Flutur; Acting	Leader of the National Liberal Party; 2022–2024	Succeeded by Ilie Bolojan; Acting
