= Presidency of Nicușor Dan =

Romanian presidential administration since 2025

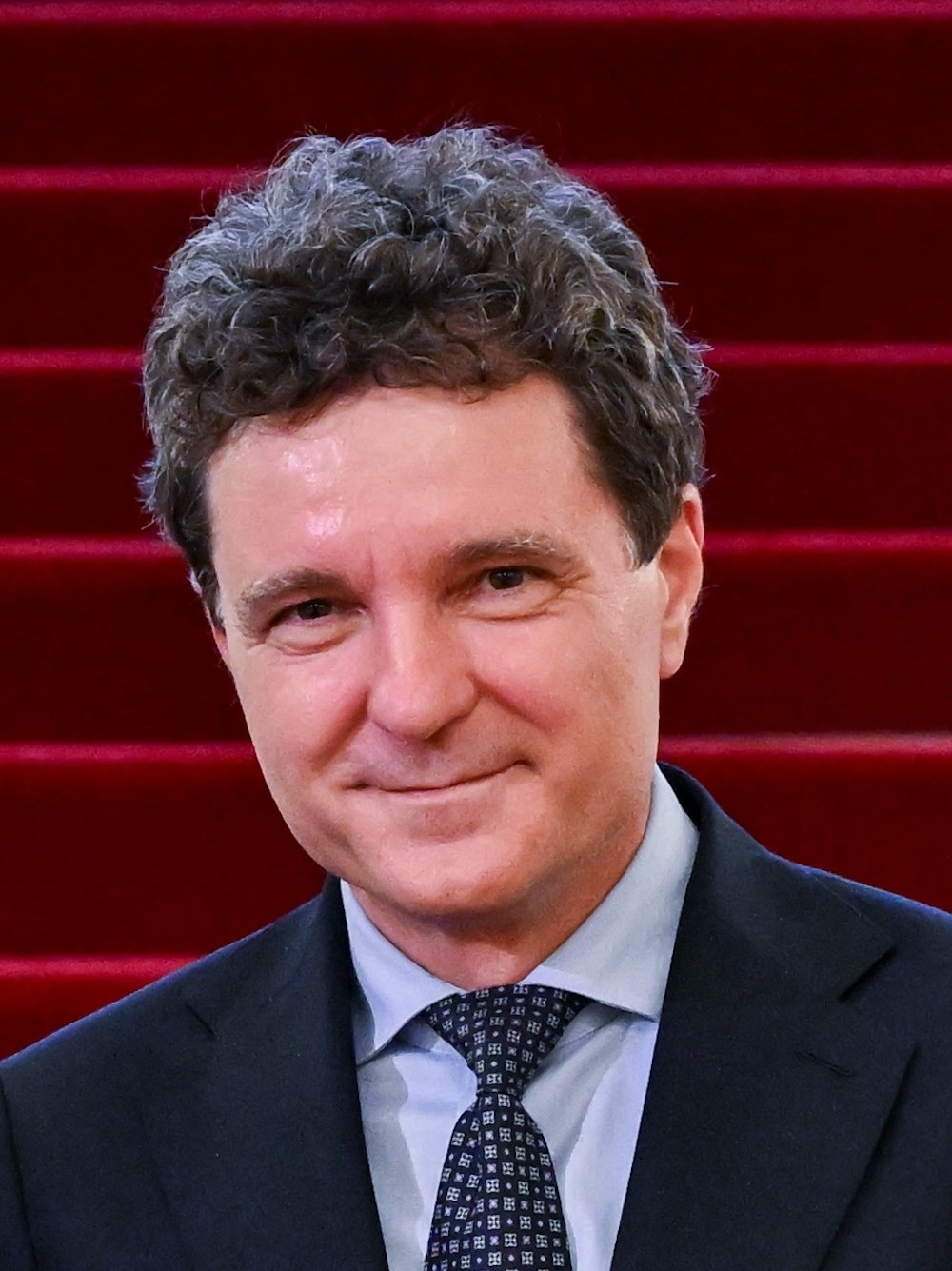
- Nicușor Dan at Cotroceni Palace, 2025
- Presidency of Nicușor Dan; 26 May 2025 – present
- Prime Minister: Cătălin Predoiu (interim) Ilie Bolojan Luca Niculescu
- Cabinet: Bolojan cabinet Niculescu cabinet
- Party: Independent
- Election: 2025
- Seat: Cotroceni Palace

Nicușor Dan's current tenure as the president of Romania began upon his inauguration as the 6th president on 26 May 2025.

== 2025 election ==
Dan, who previously served as Mayor General of Bucharest from 2020 to 2025 announced his candidacy for the 2025 Romanian presidential election on 16 December 2024 following the cancellation of the 2024 Romanian presidential election due to alleged Russian interference in favour of Călin Georgescu. The decision was made following polling that indicated a chance of success.

On 7 March 2025, Dan formally filed his candidacy to the Central Electoral Bureau after receiving the required signatures, with the Constitutional Court of Romania (CCR) validating his candidacy on 16 March. Early on, polls for the first round on 4 May indicated a clear lead for George Simion from the Alliance for the Union of Romanians party and a tight race for second place between Dan and A.Ro candidate Crin Antonescu. In the end, Simion won 40.96 per cent of the vote in the first round, while Dan defeated Antonescu for second round with less than a percentage point. In the runoff on 18 May, Simion was heavily favoured to win, with Dan winning an unexpected 53.6–46.4% victory against Simion. Dan defeated Simion particularly among urban voters, women and ethnic minorities, notably Hungarians.

== Transition period, inauguration, and first 100 days ==
=== Transition period ===
With Klaus Iohannis, which had been the president of Romania from 2014 to 2025, having resigned to political pressure on 12 February, the office had since then been held by interim president Ilie Bolojan. On the day after the election, president-elect Dan met with interim president Bolojan. Following the meeting, Dan stated that he sought to form a cabinet of pro-European parties, PSD, PNL, USR, UDMR and national minorities, and indicated Bolojan as his proposal for the position of prime minister, the interim prime minister at the time being Cătălin Predoiu. Having previously conceded the election, Simion filed an objection of the results to the CCR on 20 May, alleging mass voter fraud. Two days later, the CCR official validated the election during a plenary session with Dan and Bolojan present. On 21 May, Dan informally met with the EU parliament president Roberta Metsola. On his last day before taking office, Dan visited the Polish capital Warsaw to speak at a campaign event, endorsing Polish presidential candidate Rafał Trzaskowski. Trzaskowski's subsequent defeat days later to PiS-endorsed candidate Karol Nawrocki was described as a blow to Dan's attempt to establish pro-EU allies in Eastern Europe.

=== Inauguration ===
The inauguration took place on 26 May at the Cotroceni presidential palace. In his inauguration speech, Dan said that the Romanian state needed "fundamental change" and "positive pressure" on its institutions to reform, adding that he would support the creation of a guarantee fund for Romanian investments in Moldova and the expansion of cultural and academic exchanges. Concurrently, Dan's partner of 20 years, Mirabela Grădinaru, became first lady, an unofficial title.

=== Government formation ===
Dan's first weeks in office were marked by government negotiations. During the campaign, Dan had supported Ilie Bolojan for prime minister. However, the acting chairman of the PSD, Sorin Grindeanu, argued that since the PSD was the largest party in the proposed coalition, it should hold the prime minister position. He proposed a rotating premiership between the PSD and PNL, similar to the arrangement used to resolve the 2021 political crisis, when the office rotated from Nicolae Ciucă (Ciucă Cabinet) to Marcel Ciolacu (Ciolacu I and II). Dan and the PSD opposed this solution, favouring a stable government instead.

On 12 June, Adevărul reported on increasingly tense negotiations with internal leaks to the press. By 15 June, Journalist Cristian Tudor Popescu criticised the PSD for letting the negotiations go into deadlock by not accepting Bolojan as PM. The deadline for the approval of a new prime minister was 20 June, before the government would have lost its power. On 16 June, Dan hinted that he would appoint Bolojan prime minister later that week.

== Domestic policy ==
=== Corruption ===
On 29 May 2025, the CCR ruled that the asset and interest declarations of public officials, including information regarding the property and income of their spouses and relatives, will no longer be publicly accessible. Journalist Cristian Tudor Popescu scrutinised the decision, describing it as a major setback to Dan's anti-corruption agenda. Dan also criticised the ruling, stating "If the reasoning behind the decision identifies technical deficiencies in the current legislative framework, it is the responsibility of Parliament to correct them swiftly". University of Bucharest PhD law professor Ionuț-Bogdan Dima stated on 13 June that he believed the decision revolved around the idea invoked by the CCR according to which the publication of asset declarations would be an intrusion into private life, stating "It is a proportionality test that in fact involves the analysis of fundamental rights that are in conflict: the right to privacy of the persons obliged to submit declarations of assets, and the right of access to public information, an element of transparency that belongs to citizens".

=== Economy ===
At the time of taking office, Romania was experiencing the highest inflation rate among any EU member state with an annual inflation rate of 4.9%. On the day before his inauguration, Politico wrote that his presidency came at a critical time for Romania, with the threats of credit rating downgrades, a budget deficit crisis and decreasing faith in democratic institutions. On 14 June, during the government negotiations, Bolojan warned that Romania was at risk of defaulting if the budget deficit was not addressed.

=== Defence ===
At his first major international meeting in Vilnius on 2 June 2025, Dan announced support for increasing Romania's defence spending to 3.5% of GDP. He also held a bilateral meeting with Ukrainian president Volodymyr Zelenskyy.

=== Other ===
On 31 May 2025, Dan visited the Praid salt mine in Harghita County, one of the country's largest salt reserves, which had been shut down earlier that month due to severe flooding, gravely impacting the local economy. On 8 June, Dan made an appearance during the final professional match of handballer Cristina Neagu, praising her career. On 13 June, Dan commemorated the 30th anniversary of the June 1990 Mineriad, describing it as one of "the most painful" moments in Romania's post-communist history.

== Foreign policy ==
=== European Union ===
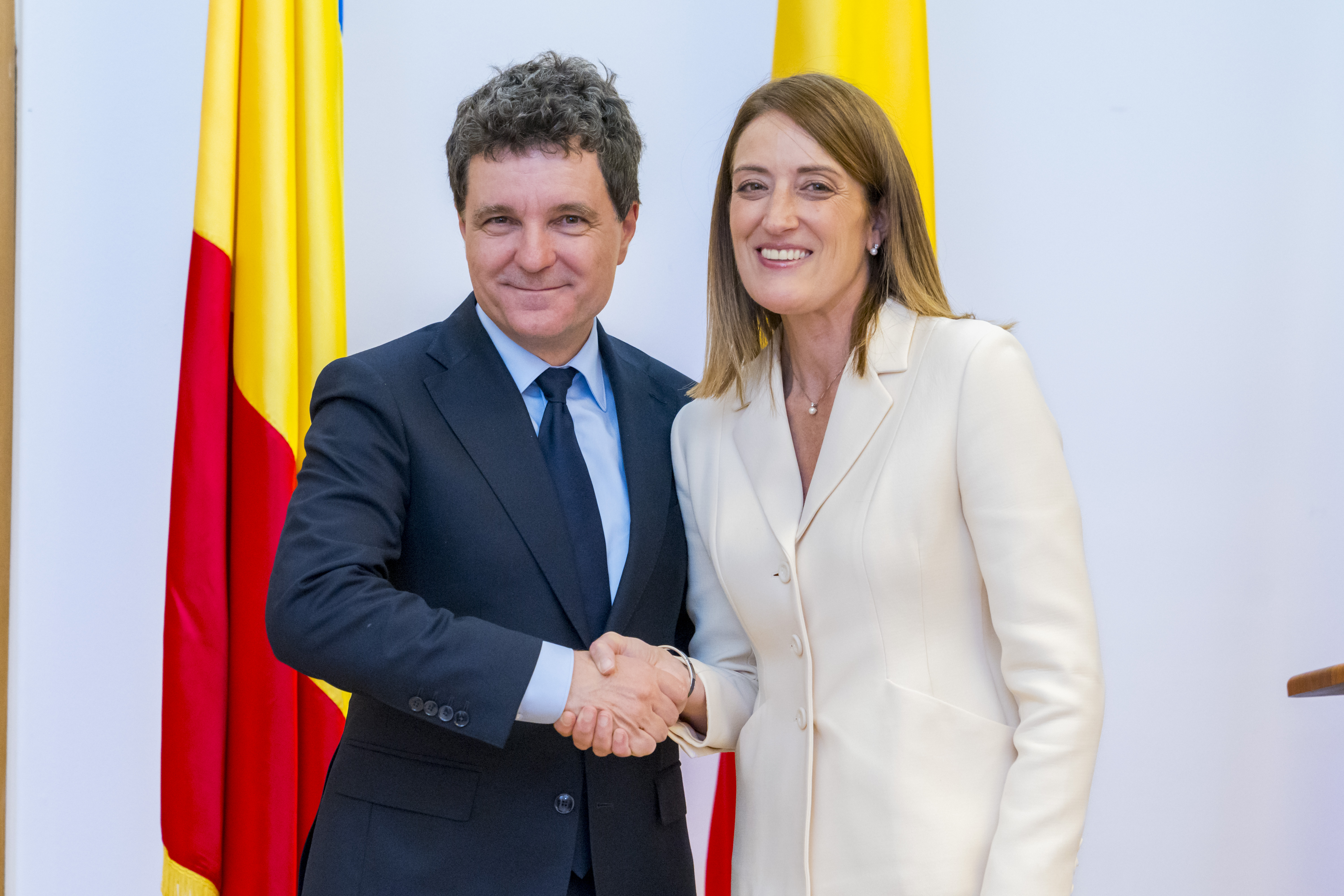
Dan with EU Parliament president Roberta Metsola on 21 May 2025

During the campaign, Dan declared himself pro-European Union and pro-Western candidate, continuously emphasising Romania's commitment to the European Union, describing it as essential for Romanian political stability, security and prosperity. Several European leaders congratulated Dan upon his victory, including the French president Emmanuel Macron, Ukrainian president Volodymyr Zelenskyy, former Romanian president Ion Illiescu, Moldovan president Maia Sandu, Polish prime minister Donald Tusk and EU Commission president Ursula von der Leyen.

=== United States ===
On 27 May 2025, Dan held a phone conversation with U.S. President Donald Trump who days prior had announced Darryl Nirenberg his nominee for new U.S. ambassador to Romania. The following day, Dan wrote on X "The U.S. is Romania's closest ally and vital strategic partner".

=== Moldova ===
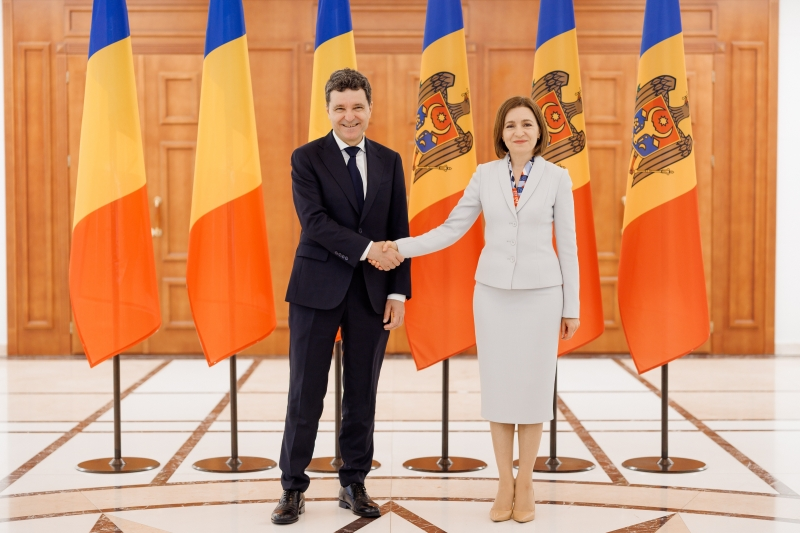
Romanian President Nicușor Dan and Moldovan President Maia Sandu

Having announced to do so two days prior, Dan paid his first visit to Moldova on 10 June, being welcomed in Chișinău by Moldovan president Maia Sandu. One day later, he visited Ukraine. AUR senate leader Petrișor Peiu described the visit as a missed opportunity to discuss the Romanian minority in Ukraine.

=== Ukraine ===
President Nicusor Dan supports the sovereignty and territorial integrity of Ukraine and has had several meetings with President Volodymyr Zelenskyy. In 2024 and 2025, there were several conflicts between the Orthodox Church of Ukraine, supported by the Ukrainian state, and the Romanian parishioners, affiliated with the Ukrainian Orthodox Church, which broke away from the Moscow Patriarchate in 2022. An example took place in June 2025, during Dan's presidency, namely the seizure by the Ukrainian authorities of the Metropolitan Cathedral in Chernivtsi, where there were also services in Romanian, and its transfer to the Diocese of Feognost (Bodoriak), which declared "today the first service in Ukrainian was held here". The takeover was violent, with beatings between the old parishioners, including Romanians, and Feognost's supporters, supported by the authorities. A similar fate had other Romanian-language churches in Chernivtsi. Romanian organizations in Ukraine have asked for the support of Romanian president Nicușor Dan against the abuses of the Orthodox Church of Ukraine, but he has not taken a public position in this regard.

On 24 August 2025, on the Ukrainian Independence Day, the Ukrainian flag was raised at the Presidential Palace, at the request of Nicușor Dan.

== See also ==
- Second presidency of Donald Trump
- Presidency of Emmanuel Macron
- von der Leyen Commission II
