= First Ciolacu cabinet =

133rd government of Romania

First Ciolacu Cabinet
- 133rd Cabinet of Romania

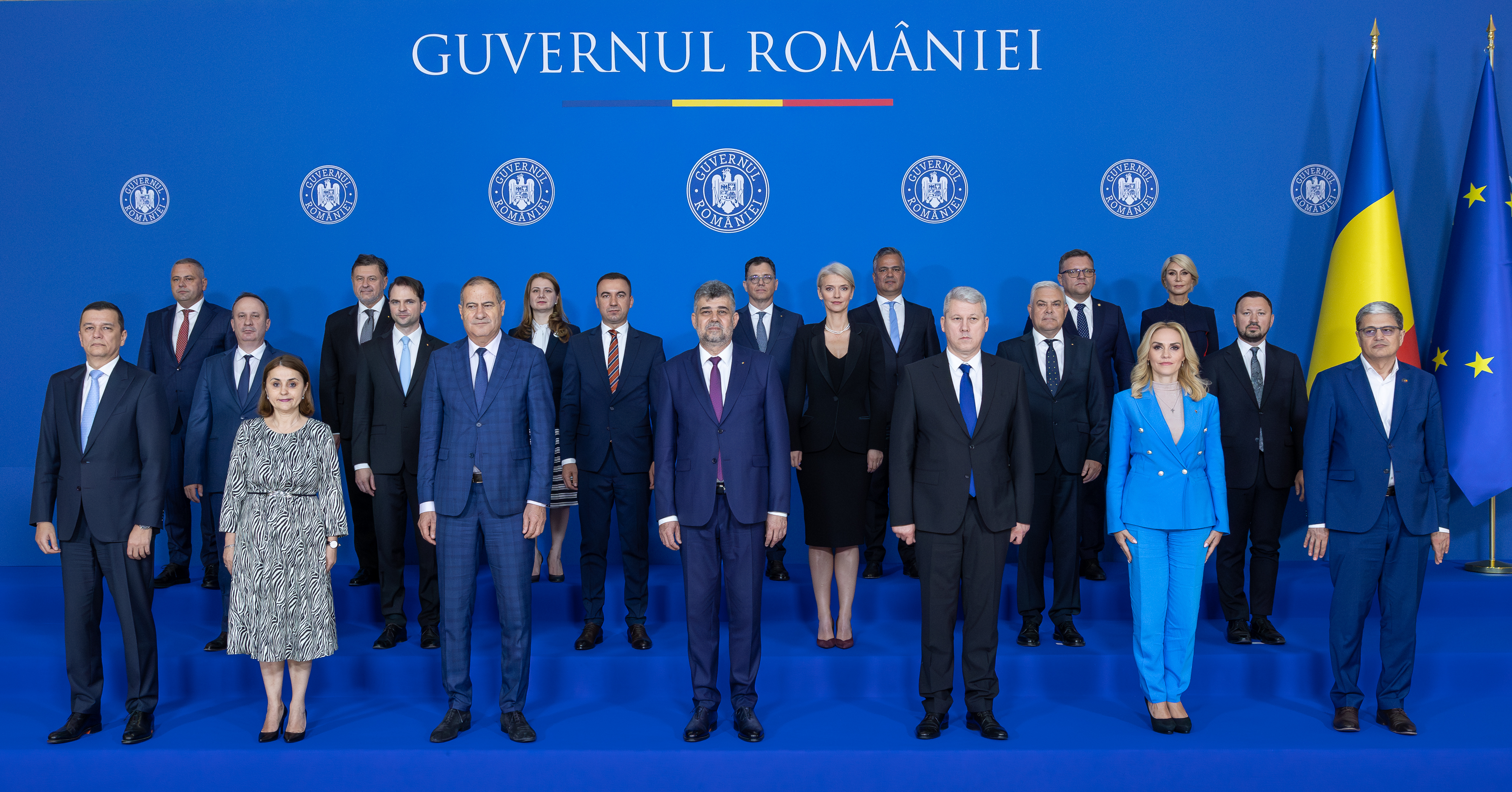
- Official cabinet portrait
- Date formed: 15 June 2023
- Date dissolved: 23 December 2024

People and organisations
- President: Klaus Iohannis
- Prime Minister: Marcel Ciolacu (PSD)
- Deputy Prime Ministers: Marian Neacșu (PSD); Cătălin Predoiu (PNL)
- Secretary-General: Mircea Abrudean (PNL)
- No. of ministers: 18
- Total no. of members: 22
- Member parties: PSD; PNL
- Status in legislature: Rotative coalition (Majority)
- Opposition parties: USR; AUR; UDMR/RMDSZ; FD; SOS; REPER
- Opposition leaders: Cătălin Drulă and Elena Lasconi (USR); George Simion (AUR); Hunor Kelemen (UDMR/RMDSZ); Ludovic Orban (FD); Diana Iovanovici Șoșoacă (SOS); Dragoș Pîslaru (REPER); Ramona Strugariu (REPER)

History
- Election: 2020
- Legislature term: 2020–2024
- Predecessor: Ciucă
- Successor: Ciolacu II

The First Ciolacu Cabinet was the 133rd government of Romania, from 15 June 2023 to 23 December 2024. The government was led by Marcel Ciolacu, who is also the current leader of the Social Democratic Party (PSD).

The cabinet was the result of a delayed rotation between Nicolae Ciucă (who led the previous cabinet) and Ciolacu, as part of the protocol of the governing National Coalition for Romania (Romanian: Coaliția Națională pentru România, CNR), of which members were the Social Democratic Party (PSD) and the National Liberal Party (PNL).

== Composition ==
Composition
Position	Minister	Party	Date sworn in	Left office
Prime Minister (Romanian: Prim-ministru)	Marcel Ciolacu	PSD	15 June 2023	23 December 2024
Deputy Prime Minister (Romanian: Viceprim-ministru)	Marian Neacșu	PSD	15 June 2023	23 December 2024
Deputy Prime Minister (Romanian: Viceprim-ministru)	Cătălin Predoiu	PNL	15 June 2023	23 December 2024
Secretary-General of the Government (Romanian: Secretarul General al Guvernului)	Mircea Abrudean	PNL	3 July 2023	23 December 2024
Minister of Foreign Affairs (Romanian: Ministrul Afacerilor Externe)	Luminița Odobescu	PNL	15 June 2023	23 December 2024
Minister of Internal Affairs (Romanian: Ministrul Afacerilor Interne)	Cătălin Predoiu	PNL	15 June 2023	23 December 2024
Minister of National Defence (Romanian: Ministrul Apărării Naționale)	Angel Tîlvăr	PSD	15 June 2023	23 December 2024
Minister of Development (Romanian: Ministrul Dezvoltării)	Adrian Veștea	PNL	15 June 2023	23 December 2024
Minister of Justice (Romanian: Ministrul Justiției)	Alina Gorghiu	PNL	15 June 2023	23 December 2024
Minister of Health (Romanian: Ministrul Sănătății)	Alexandru Rafila	PSD	15 June 2023	23 December 2024
Minister of Education (Romanian: Ministrul Educației)	Ligia Deca	PNL	15 June 2023	23 December 2024
Minister of Labour and Social Solidarity (Romanian: Ministrul Muncii și Solidarității Sociale)	Marius Budăi	PSD	15 June 2023	13 July 2023
Minister of Labour and Social Solidarity (Romanian: Ministrul Muncii și Solidarității Sociale)	Simona Bucura-Oprescu	PSD	19 July 2023	23 December 2024
Minister of Finance (Romanian: Ministrul Finanțelor)	Marcel Boloș	PNL	15 June 2023	23 December 2024
Minister of Investments and European Projects (Romanian: Ministrul Investițiilor și Proiectelor Europene)	Adrian Câciu	PSD	15 June 2023	23 December 2024
Minister of Economy, Entrepreneurship and Tourism (Romanian: Ministrul Economiei, Antreprenoriatului și Turismului)	Stefan-Radu Oprea	PSD	15 June 2023	23 December 2024
Minister of Transport and Infrastructure (Romanian: Ministrul Transporturilor și Infrastructurii)	Sorin Grindeanu	PSD	15 June 2023	23 December 2024
Minister of Agriculture (Romanian: Ministrul Agriculturii)	Florin-Ionuț Barbu	PSD	15 June 2023	23 December 2024
Minister of Family, Youth and Equality of Opportunity (Romanian: Ministrul Familiei, Tineretului și Egalității de Șanse)	Gabriela Firea	PSD	15 June 2023	14 July 2023
Minister of Family, Youth and Equality of Opportunity (Romanian: Ministrul Familiei, Tineretului și Egalității de Șanse)	Natalia-Elena Intotero	PSD	19 July 2023	23 December 2024
Minister of Research, Innovation and Digitalisation (Romanian: Ministrul Cercetării, Inovării și Digitalizării)	Bogdan-Gruia Ivan	PSD	15 June 2023	23 December 2024
Minister of Culture (Romanian: Ministrul Culturii)	Raluca Turcan	PNL	15 June 2023	23 December 2024
Minister of Environment (Romanian: Ministrul Mediului)	Mircea Fechet	PNL	15 June 2023	23 December 2024
Minister of Energy (Romanian: Ministrul Energiei)	Sebastian Burduja	PNL	15 June 2023	23 December 2024

== Party breakdown ==
Party breakdown of cabinet members on the date of investing:

- Social Democratic Party (PSD) = 1 Prime Minister, 1 Deputy Prime Minister, and 9 ministers
- National Liberal Party (PNL) = 1 Deputy Prime Minister and minister, 1 Secretary-General of the Government, and 9 ministers
11
11

As it can be noticed above, the share of power is equal between the two political parties which constitute the CNR ruling coalition in this particular cabinet.
