= 2024–2028 legislature of the Romanian Parliament =

Current legislature of the Parliament of Romania

Parliament of Romania LVII legislature
←	2020–2024

Overview
- Term: 20 December 2024 – present
- Government: PSD, PNL, UDMR/RMDSZ (2024 – 2025); PSD (Note: until April 2026), PNL, USR, UDMR/RMDSZ (2025 – 2026); PSD (2026 – present)
- Opposition: AUR, USR, SOS RO, POT (2024 – 2025); AUR, SOS RO, POT, PACE (2025 – 2026); PNL, AUR, USR, SOS RO, UDMR/RMDSZ (2026 – present)

Senate
- Political structure of the Senate
- Members: 134
- President of the Senate: Ilie Bolojan (PNL) (23 December 2024 – 23 June 2025); Mircea Abrudean (PNL) (23 June 2025 – present)
- PSD leader: Paul Stănescu
- PNL leader: Vasile Blaga
- USR leader: Cristian Ghinea
- AUR leader: Laurențiu Plăeșu
- UDMR leader: Levente Novák

Chamber of Deputies
- Political structure of the Chamber of Deputies
- Members: 330
- President of the Chamber of Deputies: Ciprian-Constantin Șerban (PSD) (23 December 2024 – present)
- PSD leader: Sorin Grindeanu
- PNL leader: Lucian Bode
- USR leader: Oana Țoiu
- AUR leader: George Simion
- UDMR leader: Dénes Seres
- FDGR leader: Ovidiu-Victor Ganț

Government
- Second Ciolacu cabinet (coalition): Marcel Ciolacu (23 December 2024 – 23 June 2025)
- Bolojan cabinet (coalition): Ilie Bolojan (23 June 2025 – 20 October 2026)
- Niculescu cabinet (minority): Luca Niculescu (20 October 2026 – incumbent)

Sessions
- 1st: December 2024 – February 2025
- 2nd: February 2025 – June 2025
- 3rd: September 2025 – December 2025
- 4th: February 2026 – June 2026
- 5th: September 2026 – Present

The 2024–2028 legislature of the Romanian Parliament is the current legislature of the Parliament of Romania, elected on 1 December 2024. In the said election, no party won an outright majority, but the Social Democratic Party (PSD) remained the largest political force in the parliament, and stayed in government. PSD along with National Liberal Party (PNL), and the Democratic Alliance of Hungarians in Romania (UDMR/RMDSZ) formed a new coalition government. The AUR came in second place and became the main opposition party. In the context of 2024 Romanian presidential election annulment another two far-right parties entered in parliament: S.O.S. Romania and Party of Young People (the last one at that time associated with Călin Georgescu). The Save Romania Union (USR) entered parliament starting this legislature being in opposition, however his popularity it stagnated.

Marcel Ciolacu resigned in early May 2025 following poor performance at the 2025 Romanian presidential election where candidate of a coalition between PSD, PNL, and UDMR/RMDSZ, Crin Antonescu, failed to enter in second round of election. On June 23, 2025, Ilie Bolojan was officially inaugurated as Prime Minister of Romania, supported by a coalition between PSD, PNL, USR and UDMR/RMDSZ, an unprecedented four-party coalition considering the differences between them and the tensions of the past. The new government has embarked on a program aimed at reducing the excessive budget deficit generated by previous governments by taking austerity measures. However, some of the measures have been criticized by civil society and unions because they would attack the already underfunded welfare state, and public sectors, such as education, and because some cuts were unnecessary.

== Chamber of Deputies ==
The President of the Chamber of Deputies for this legislature was initially Ciprian-Constantin Șerban (PSD) from December 2024 until his resignation in June 2025. Since 23 June 2025, the office had been held by Sorin Grindeanu (PSD).

Seats in the Chamber of Deputies of Romania
Party	Election seating		Lost	Won	Present seating	
Party	Seats	%	Lost	Won	Seats	%
Social Democratic Party	86	26.06%	0	7	93	28.18%
Alliance for the Union of Romanians	64	19.39%	2	0	62	18.78%
National Liberal Party	49	14.84%	0	2	51	15.45%
Save Romania Union	40	12.12%	0	0	40	12.12%
S.O.S. Romania	27	8.18%	12	0	15	4.54%
Party of Young People	24	7.27%	19	0	5 (Note: Sitting as unaffiliated deputies)	1.51%
Democratic Alliance of Hungarians in Romania	22	6.66%	0	0	22	6.66%
Parties of ethnic minorities	18	5.45%	0	0	18	5.45%
United for Romania	—	—	0	19	19 (Note: PEACE – Romania First did not exist at the time of the 2024 legislative elections. All deputies were elected on POT's and SOS RO's list. Also, some of the POT deputies have either left for other parties. There is an organizational conflict between the party leadership and the deputies who changed the name of the parliamentary group to United for Romania.)	5.75%
Independents	—	—	0	5	5	1.51%
Total	330	100	—		330	100

== Senate ==
The President of the Senate for this legislature was initially Ilie Bolojan (PNL), from December 2024 until his resignation from office on 23 June 2025, being shortly afterwards replaced by Mircea Abrudean (PNL). This replacement was because Bolojan was invested in Prime Minister's office.

Party	Election seating		+/–	Present seating	
Party	Seats	% (Note: Excluding vacant seats)		Seats	%
Social Democratic Party	36	26.87%	+2	38	28.36%
Alliance for the Union of Romanians	28	20.90%	—	28	20.90%
National Liberal Party	22	16.42%	—	22	16.42%
Save Romania Union	19	14.18%	—	19	14.18%
S.O.S. Romania	12	8.96%	–11	1 (Note: Sitting as unaffiliated senators)	0.75%
Democratic Union of Hungarians	10	7.46%	—	10	7.46%
Party of Young People	7	5.22%	–2	5	3.73%
PEACE – Romania First	—	—	+11	11 (Note: PEACE – Romania First did not exist at the time of the 2024 legislative elections. All deputies were elected on POT's and SOS RO's list.)	8.21%
Vacant	2		—	2	
TOTAL	134 (+2 vacant)		—	134 (+2 vacant)	

== See also ==
- Parliament of Romania
- Politics of Romania
- List of members of the Chamber of Deputies of Romania (2020–2024)
