= Niculescu cabinet =

136th government of Romania

- 136th Cabinet of Romania

- Date formed: 20 October 2026

People and organisations
- President: Nicușor Dan
- Prime Minister: Luca Niculescu
- Deputy Prime Ministers: Marian Neacșu
- Secretary-General: Gabriel-Ciprian Ene
- No. of ministers: 19
- Total no. of members: 19
- Member parties: PSD
- Status in legislature: Minority with confidence and supply from the PNL, UDMR, UPR, Minority parties and independents 132 / 464
- Opposition parties: AUR; USR; SOS

History
- Election: 2024
- Legislature term: 2024–2028
- Predecessor: Bolojan

The Niculescu cabinet is the 136th government of Romania, since 20 October 2026. The government is led by Luca Niculescu.

The cabinet was formed following a political crisis that started in May 2026, when Prime Minister Ilie Bolojan was removed through a motion of no confidence supported by the Social Democratic Party (PSD) and the opposition Alliance for the Union of Romanians (AUR). After three unsuccessful attempts to appoint a successor, President Nicușor Dan nominated Niculescu on 5 October. Niculescu subsequently secured parliamentary approval for his cabinet on 20 October, ending months of political deadlock.

== Composition ==
Composition
Position	Minister	Party	Date sworn in	Left office
Prime Minister (Romanian: Prim-ministru)	Luca Niculescu	Independent	20 October 2026	Incumbent
Deputy Prime Minister, Minister of Internal Affairs (Romanian: Viceprim-ministru, Ministrul Afacerilor Interne)	Marian Neacșu	PSD	20 October 2026	Incumbent
Minister of National Defence (Romanian: Ministrul Apărării Naționale)	Ștefan-Radu Oprea	PSD	20 October 2026	Incumbent
Minister of Agriculture, and Rural Development (Romanian: Ministrul Agriculturii și Dezvoltării Rurale)	Florin-Ionuț Barbu	PSD	20 October 2026	Incumbent
Minister of Culture (Romanian: Ministrul Culturii)	Ioana Ciocan	Independent	20 October 2026	Incumbent
Minister of Development, Public Works, and Administration (Romanian: Ministrul Dezvoltării, Lucrărilor Publice și Administrației)	Alexandru Stoica	PSD	20 October 2026	Incumbent
Minister of Economy, Digitalisation, Entrepreneurship, and Tourism (Romanian: Ministrul Economiei, Digitalizării, Antreprenoriatului și Turismului)	Daniel Zamfir	PSD	20 October 2026	Incumbent
Minister of Education and Research (Romanian: Ministrul Educației și Cercetării)	Sorin Costreie	Independent	20 October 2026	Incumbent
Minister delegate for Pre-university Education (Romanian: Ministrul delegat pentru Educație Preuniversitară)	Sorin Ionescu	PSD	20 October 2026	Incumbent
Minister of Digitalisation and Artificial Intelligence (Romanian: Ministrul Digitalizării și Intelgenței Artificiale)	Bogdan Dumitru	Independent	20 October 2026	Incumbent
Minister of Energy (Romanian: Ministrul Energiei)	Dumitru Chisăliță	Independent	20 October 2026	Incumbent
Minister of Environment, Water, and Forests (Romanian: Ministrul Mediului, Apelor și Pădurilor)	Natalia-Elena Intotero	PSD	20 October 2026	Incumbent
Minister of Finance (Romanian: Ministrul Finanțelor)	Alexandru Nazare	Independent	23 June 2025	Incumbent
Minister of Foreign Affairs (Romanian: Ministrul Afacerilor Externe)	Dan Neculăescu	Independent	20 October 2026	Incumbent
Minister of Health (Romanian: Ministrul Sănătății)	Alexandru Rogobete	PSD	20 October 2026	Incumbent
Minister of Investments and European Projects (Romanian: Ministrul Investițiilor și Proiectelor Europene)	Mihai Ghigiu	PSD	20 October 2026	Incumbent
Minister of Justice (Romanian: Ministrul Justiției)	Radu Marinescu	PSD	20 October 2026	Incumbent
Minister of Labour, Family, Youth, and Social Solidarity (Romanian: Ministrul Muncii, Familiei, Tineretului și Solidarității Sociale)	Florin Manole	PSD	20 October 2026	Incumbent
Minister of Transport and Infrastructure (Romanian: Ministrul Transporturilor și Infrastructurii)	Ștefan-Ovidiu Popa	PSD	20 October 2026	Incumbent
