= Bolojan cabinet =

135th government of Romania

- 135th Cabinet of Romania

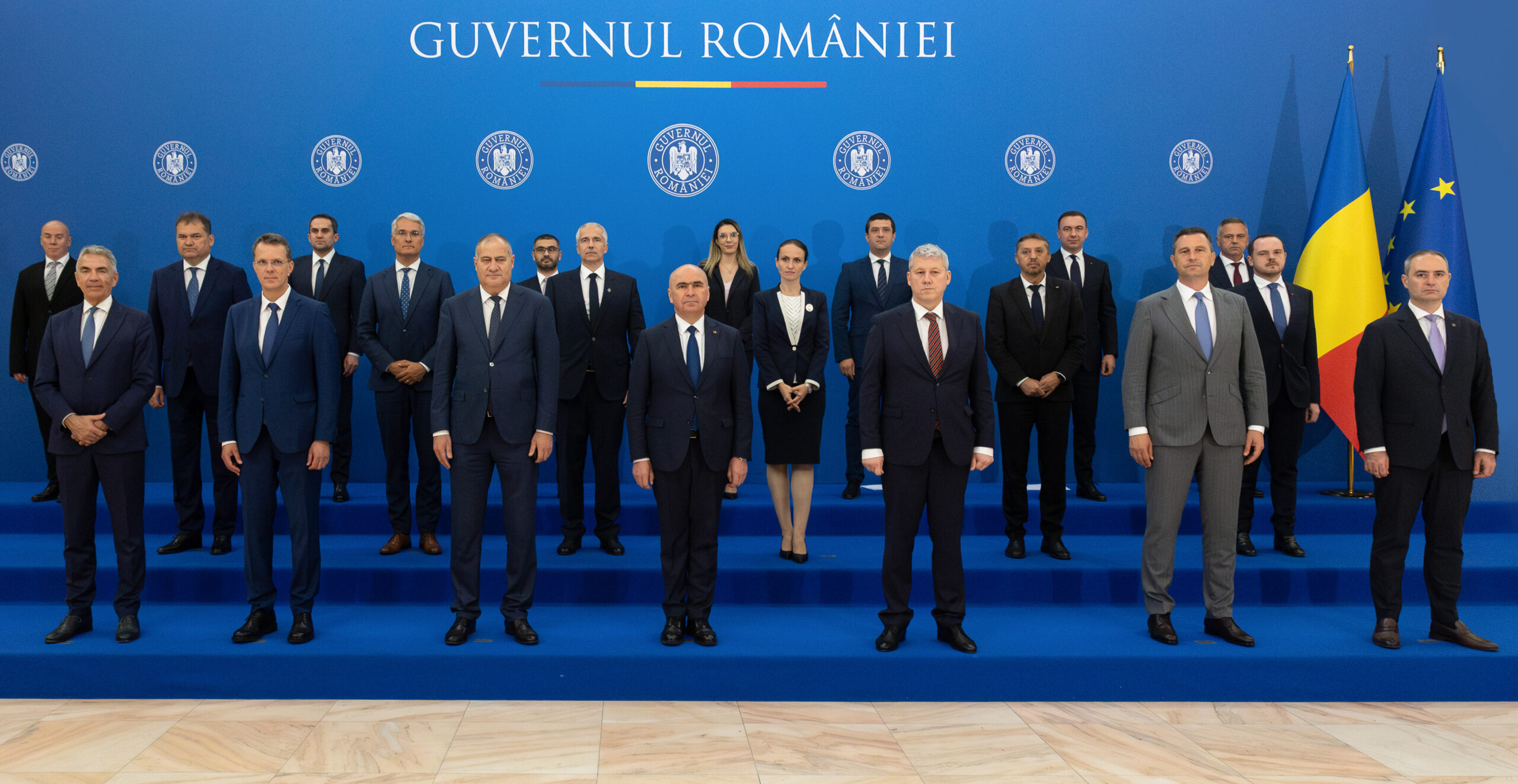
- Date formed: 23 June 2025
- Date dissolved: 20 October 2026

People and organisations
- President: Nicușor Dan
- Prime Minister: Ilie Bolojan
- Deputy Prime Ministers: Cătălin Predoiu; Barna Tánczos; Oana Gheorghiu (since October 2025); Radu Miruță (since December 2025); Dragoș Anastasiu (until July 2025); Ionuț Moșteanu (until November 2025); Marian Neacșu (until April 2026)
- Secretary-General: Ștefan-Radu Oprea
- No. of ministers: 16
- Total no. of members: 19
- Member parties: PNL; USR; UDMR/RMDSZ; PSD (until 2026)
- Status in legislature: Majority (rotative coalition) (2025–2026); Minority (coalition) (2026); Caretaker government (2026–2026)
- Opposition parties: PSD (from 2026); AUR; SOS; UPR; PACE

History
- Election: 2024
- Legislature term: 2024–2028
- Predecessor: Ciolacu II
- Successor: Niculescu

The Bolojan cabinet was the 135th government of Romania, from 23 June 2025 until 20 October 2026, also in a caretaker capacity since 5 May 2026 to its end. The government is led by Ilie Bolojan, the leader of the National Liberal Party (PNL). On 5 May 2025, the day after the 2025 Romanian presidential election, then incumbent prime minister Marcel Ciolacu of the Social Democratic Party (PSD) announced his resignation.

On 16 June, President Nicușor Dan hinted that he would appoint Bolojan prime minister later that week, with a coalition deal with the PSD being confirmed the following day. The deal involved Bolojan being appointed prime minister first yet with the mention that he should leave office in 2027 for a PSD prime minister to take over the position. Bolojan was formally nominated on 20 June and confirmed by the Chamber of Deputies in a 301 to 9 vote on 23 June.

The PSD subsequently withdrew from the government in April 2026 and redacted a motion of no confidence together with the far-right party Alliance for the Union of Romanians (AUR). According to The Wall Street Journal, the United States ambassador to Greece Kimberly Guilfoyle allegedly said at a dinner in Athens in March 2026 that the United States had been involved in the fall of the Bolojan government, adding that the United States could do the same to any country; Guilfoyle's lawyer disputed the account, while the Financial Times independently corroborated The Wall Street Journal's report.

== Composition ==
Composition
Position	Minister	Party	Date sworn in	Left office
Prime Minister (Romanian: Prim-ministru)	Ilie Bolojan	PNL	23 June 2025	20 October 2026
Deputy Prime Minister (Romanian: Viceprim-ministru)	Dragoș Anastasiu	Independent	23 June 2025	27 July 2025
Deputy Prime Minister (Romanian: Viceprim-ministru)	Oana Gheorghiu	PNL	30 October 2025	20 October 2026
Deputy Prime Minister (Romanian: Viceprim-ministru)	Ionuț Moșteanu	USR	23 June 2025	28 November 2025
Deputy Prime Minister (Romanian: Viceprim-ministru)	Radu Miruță	USR	23 December 2025	20 October 2026
Deputy Prime Minister (Romanian: Viceprim-ministru)	Marian Neacșu	PSD	23 June 2025	25 April 2026
Deputy Prime Minister (Romanian: Viceprim-ministru)	Cătălin Predoiu	PNL	23 June 2025	20 October 2026
Deputy Prime Minister (Romanian: Viceprim-ministru)	Barna Tánczos	UDMR/RMDSZ	23 June 2025	20 October 2026
Minister of Internal Affairs (Romanian: Ministrul Afacerilor Interne)	Cătălin Predoiu	PNL	23 June 2025	20 October 2026
Minister of National Defence (Romanian: Ministrul Apărării Naționale)	Ionuț Moșteanu	USR	23 June 2025	28 November 2025
Minister of National Defence (Romanian: Ministrul Apărării Naționale)	Radu Miruță	USR	28 November 2025 23 December 2025	20 October 2026
Minister of Agriculture, and Rural Development (Romanian: Ministrul Agriculturii și Dezvoltării Rurale)	Florin-Ionuț Barbu	PSD	23 June 2025	25 April 2026
Minister of Agriculture, and Rural Development (Romanian: Ministrul Agriculturii și Dezvoltării Rurale)	Barna Tánczos	UDMR/RMDSZ	25 April 2026	20 October 2026
Minister of Culture (Romanian: Ministrul Culturii)	András István Demeter	UDMR/RMDSZ	23 June 2025	20 October 2026
Minister of Development, Public Works, and Administration (Romanian: Ministrul Dezvoltării, Lucrărilor Publice și Administrației)	Attila Cseke	UDMR/RMDSZ	23 June 2025	20 October 2026
Minister of Economy, Digitalisation, Entrepreneurship, and Tourism (Romanian: Ministrul Economiei, Digitalizării, Antreprenoriatului și Turismului)	Radu Miruță	USR	23 June 2025	23 December 2025
Minister of Economy, Digitalisation, Entrepreneurship, and Tourism (Romanian: Ministrul Economiei, Digitalizării, Antreprenoriatului și Turismului)	Ambrozie-Irineu Darău	USR	23 December 2025	20 October 2026
Minister of Education and Research (Romanian: Ministrul Educației și Cercetării)	Daniel David	Independent proposed by PNL	23 June 2025	14 January 2026
Minister of Education and Research (Romanian: Ministrul Educației și Cercetării)	Ilie Bolojan	PNL	14 January 2026	27 February 2026
Minister of Education and Research (Romanian: Ministrul Educației și Cercetării)	Mihai Dimian	Independent proposed by PNL	3 March 2026	20 October 2026
Minister of Energy (Romanian: Ministrul Energiei)	Bogdan Ivan	PSD	23 June 2025	25 April 2026
Minister of Energy (Romanian: Ministrul Energiei)	Ilie Bolojan	PNL	25 April 2026	20 October 2026
Minister of Environment, Water, and Forests (Romanian: Ministrul Mediului, Apelor și Pădurilor)	Diana Buzoianu	USR	23 June 2025	20 October 2026
Minister of Finance (Romanian: Ministrul Finanțelor)	Alexandru Nazare	Independent proposed by PNL	23 June 2025	20 October 2026
Minister of Foreign Affairs (Romanian: Ministrul Afacerilor Externe)	Oana Țoiu	USR	23 June 2025	20 October 2026
Minister of Health (Romanian: Ministrul Sănătății)	Alexandru Rogobete	PSD	23 June 2025	25 April 2026
Minister of Health (Romanian: Ministrul Sănătății)	Attila Cseke	UDMR/RMDSZ	25 April 2026	20 October 2026
Minister of Investments and European Projects (Romanian: Ministrul Investițiilor și Proiectelor Europene)	Dragoș Pîslaru	PNL	23 June 2025	20 October 2026
Minister of Justice (Romanian: Ministrul Justiției)	Radu Marinescu	PSD	23 June 2025	25 April 2026
Minister of Justice (Romanian: Ministrul Justiției)	Cătălin Predoiu	PNL	25 April 2026	20 October 2026
Minister of Labour, Family, Youth, and Social Solidarity (Romanian: Ministrul Muncii, Familiei, Tineretului și Solidarității Sociale)	Florin Manole	PSD	23 June 2025	25 April 2026
Minister of Labour, Family, Youth, and Social Solidarity (Romanian: Ministrul Muncii, Familiei, Tineretului și Solidarității Sociale)	Dragoș Pîslaru	PNL	25 April 2026	20 October 2026
Minister of Transport and Infrastructure (Romanian: Ministrul Transporturilor și Infrastructurii)	Ciprian-Constantin Șerban	PSD	23 June 2025	25 April 2026
Minister of Transport and Infrastructure (Romanian: Ministrul Transporturilor și Infrastructurii)	Radu Miruță	USR	25 April 2026	20 October 2026

== Party breakdown ==
Party	Leader	Ideology	Deputies	Senators	Ministers
National Liberal Party	Ilie Bolojan	Liberal Conservatism	55 / 330	26 / 134	7 / 16
Save Romania Union	Dominic Fritz	Liberalism	40 / 330	18 / 134	5 / 16
Democratic Union of Hungarians in Romania	Hunor Kelemen	Hungarian minority interests	21 / 330	10 / 134	4 / 16
Government			116 / 330	54 / 134	16
Support			17 / 330	54 / 134	16
Total			133 / 330	54 / 134	16
