= Second Ciolacu cabinet =

134rd government of Romania

Second Ciolacu Cabinet
- 134th Cabinet of Romania

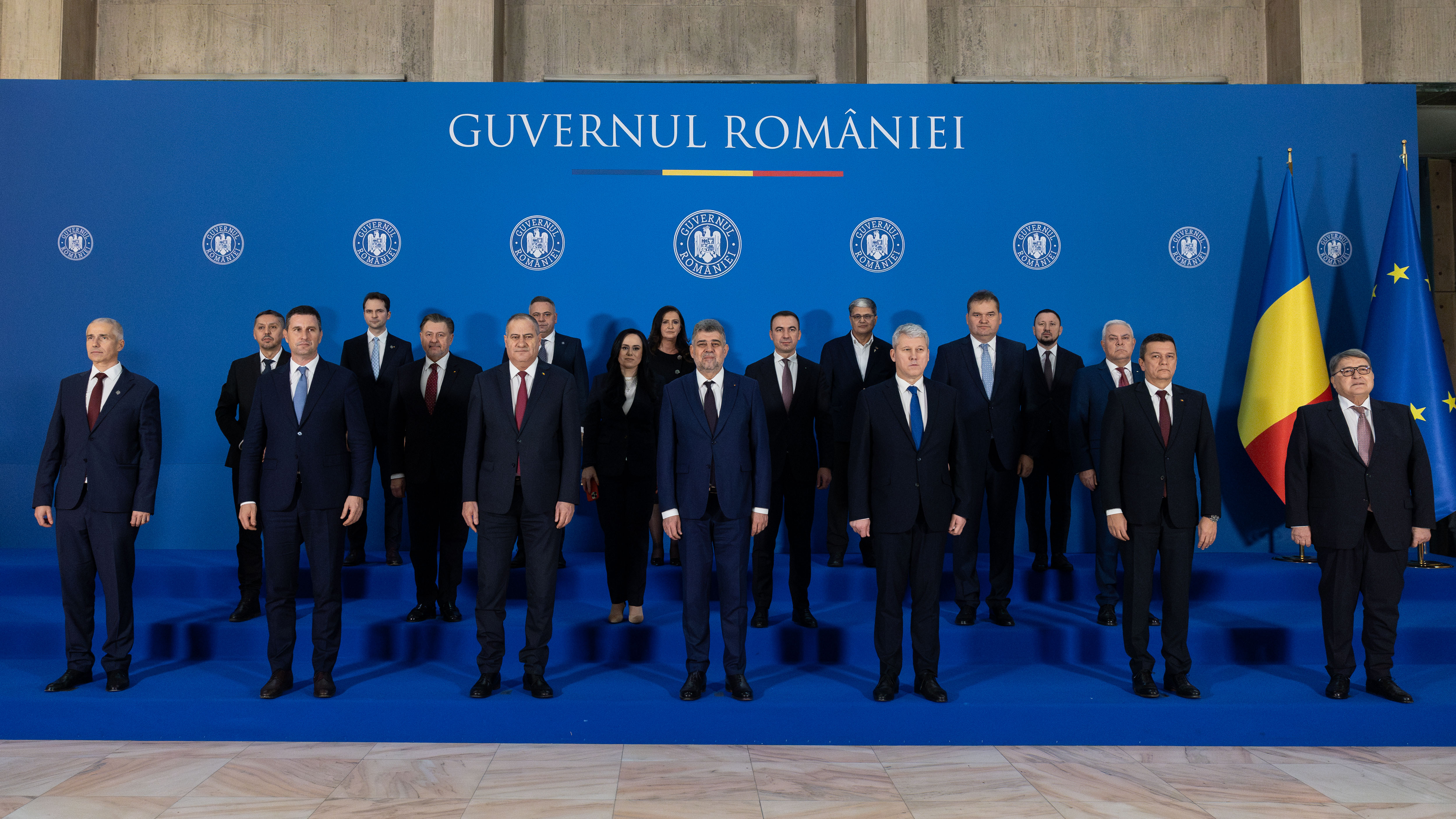
- Date formed: 23 December 2024
- Date dissolved: 23 June 2025

People and organisations
- President: Klaus Iohannis; Ilie Bolojan (acting); Nicușor Dan
- Prime Minister: Marcel Ciolacu (PSD) (Until 2025); Cătălin Predoiu (PNL) (Acting in 2025)
- Deputy Prime Ministers: Marian Neacșu (PSD); Cătălin Predoiu (PNL); Barna Tánczos (UDMR/RMDSZ)
- Secretary-General: Mihnea-Claudiu Drumea (PNL)
- No. of ministers: 16
- Total no. of members: 18
- Member parties: PSD; PNL; UDMR/RMDSZ
- Status in legislature: Coalition (Minority) (2024–2025) (with confidence and supply from the national minorities parliamentary group); Caretaker government (2025) (with confidence and supply from the national minorities parliamentary group)
- Opposition parties: AUR; USR; SOS; POT
- Opposition leaders: George Simion (AUR); Dominic Fritz (USR); Diana Iovanovici Șoșoacă (SOS); Anamaria Gavrilă (POT)

History
- Election: 2024
- Legislature term: 2024–2028
- Predecessor: Ciolacu I
- Successor: Bolojan

The Second Ciolacu Cabinet was the 134th government of Romania, from 23 December 2024 to 23 June 2025. The government was led by Marcel Ciolacu who was the leader of the Social Democratic Party (PSD) until his resignation in 2025 and the withdrawal of support for the government by his party. Cătălin Predoiu was appointed to lead the government in acting capacity on 6 May.

The cabinet was the result of the Coalition talks following the 2024 Romanian legislative election.

Following the results of the 2025 Romanian presidential election, Marcel Ciolacu announced that PSD would leave Romania Forward Alliance (A.RO), and resigned from the position of Prime Minister, which resulted in the collapse of the coalition.

== Composition ==
Composition
Position	Minister	Party	Date sworn in	Left office
Prime Minister (Romanian: Prim-ministru)	Marcel Ciolacu	PSD	23 December 2024	6 May 2025
Prime Minister (Romanian: Prim-ministru)	Cătălin Predoiu (Acting)	PNL	6 May 2025	23 June 2025
Deputy Prime Minister (Romanian: Viceprim-ministru)	Marian Neacșu	PSD	23 December 2024	23 June 2025
Deputy Prime Minister, Minister of Internal Affairs (Romanian: Viceprim-ministru, Ministrul Afacerilor Interne)	Cătălin Predoiu	PNL	23 December 2024	23 June 2025
Deputy Prime Minister, Minister of Finance (Romanian: Viceprim-ministru, Ministrul Finanțelor)	Barna Tánczos	UDMR/RMDSZ	23 December 2024	23 June 2025
Minister of Transport and Infrastructure (Romanian: Ministrul Transporturilor și Infrastructurii)	Sorin Grindeanu	PSD	23 December 2024	23 June 2025
Minister of Justice (Romanian: Ministrul Justiției)	Radu Marinescu	PSD	23 December 2024	23 June 2025
Minister of National Defence (Romanian: Ministrul Apărării Naționale)	Angel Tîlvăr	PSD	23 December 2024	23 June 2025
Minister of Economy, Digitalisation, Entrepreneurship, and Tourism (Romanian: Ministrul Economiei, Digitalizării, Antreprenoriatului și Turismului)	Bogdan-Gruia Ivan	PSD	23 December 2024	23 June 2025
Minister of Health (Romanian: Ministrul Sănătății)	Alexandru Rafila	PSD	23 December 2024	23 June 2025
Minister of Development, Public Works, and Administration (Romanian: Ministrul Dezvoltării, Lucrărilor Publice și Administrației)	Attila Cseke	UDMR/RMDSZ	23 December 2024	23 June 2025
Minister of Agriculture, and Rural Development (Romanian: Ministrul Agriculturii și Dezvoltării Rurale)	Florin-Ionuț Barbu	PSD	23 December 2024	23 June 2025
Minister of Labour, Family, Youth, and Social Solidarity (Romanian: Ministrul Muncii, Familiei, Tineretului și Solidarității Sociale)	Simona Bucura-Oprescu	PSD	23 December 2024	23 June 2025
Minister of Culture (Romanian: Ministrul Culturii)	Natalia-Elena Intotero	PSD	23 December 2024	23 June 2025
Minister of Education, and Research (Romanian: Ministrul Educației și Cercetării)	Daniel David	Independent proposed by PNL	23 December 2024	23 June 2025
Minister of Foreign Affairs (Romanian: Ministrul Afacerilor Externe)	Emil Hurezeanu	Independent proposed by PNL	23 December 2024	23 June 2025
Minister of Investments and European Projects (Romanian: Ministrul Investițiilor și Proiectelor Europene)	Marcel Boloș	PNL	23 December 2024	23 June 2025
Minister of Energy (Romanian: Ministrul Energiei)	Sebastian Burduja	PNL	23 December 2024	23 June 2025
Minister of Environment, Water, and Forests (Romanian: Ministrul Mediului, Apelor și Pădurilor)	Mircea Fechet	PNL	23 December 2024	23 June 2025

== Party breakdown ==
Party	Leader	Ideology	Deputies	Senators	Ministers
Social Democratic Party	Sorin Grindeanu	Social democracy	86 / 330	36 / 136	8 / 16
National Liberal Party	Ilie Bolojan	Christian democracy	49 / 330	22 / 136	6 / 16
Democratic Union of Hungarians in Romania	Hunor Kelemen	Hungarian minority interests	23 / 330	10 / 136	2 / 16
Government			158 / 330	68 / 136	16
Support			17 / 330	68 / 136	16
Total			175 / 330	68 / 136	16

== See also ==
- Accession of Bulgaria and Romania to the Schengen Area
