= 2020–2024 legislature of the Romanian Parliament =

Current legislature of the Parliament of Romania

Parliament of Romania LVI legislature
←	2016–2020	2024-2028	→

Overview
- Term: 20 December 2020 – 20 December 2024
- Government: PNL, USR PLUS, UDMR/RMDSZ PSD, PNL, UDMR/RMDSZ PSD, PNL
- Opposition: PSD, AUR USR, AUR, FD USR, AUR, UDMR/RMDSZ, FD, REPER

Senate
- Political structure of the Senate
- Members: 136
- President of the Senate: Anca Dragu (USR) (23 December 2020 – 23 November 2021) Florin Cîțu (PNL) (23 November 2021 – 29 June 2022); Alina Gorghiu (PNL) (29 June 2022 – 13 June 2023) Nicolae Ciucă (PNL) (13 June 2023 – 23 December 2024)
- PSD leader: Lucian Romașcanu
- PNL leader: Daniel Fenechiu
- USR leader: Radu Mihail
- AUR leader: Claudiu Târziu
- UDMR leader: Lóránd Turos

Chamber of Deputies
- Political structure of the Chamber of Deputies
- Members: 330
- President of the Chamber of Deputies: Ludovic Orban (PNL) (23 December 2020 – 13 October 2021) Florin Roman (PNL) (acting; 13 October 2021 – 2 November 2021); Sorin Grindeanu (PSD) (2 November 2021 – 23 November 2021); Marcel Ciolacu (PSD) (23 November 2021 – 15 June 2023); Alfred Simonis (PSD) (15 June 2023 – 2 September 2024) Daniel Suciu (PSD) (2 September 2024 – 23 December 2024)
- PSD leader: Alfred Simonis
- PNL leader: Florin Roman
- USR leader: Ionuț Moșteanu
- AUR leader: George Simion
- UDMR leader: Botond Csoma
- FD leader: Violeta Alexandru

Government
- Cîțu Cabinet (coalition): Florin Cîțu (23 December 2020 – 25 November 2021)
- Ciucă Cabinet (coalition): Nicolae Ciucă (25 November 2021 – 15 June 2023)
- Ciolacu Cabinet (coalition): Marcel Ciolacu (15 June 2023 – 23 December 2024)

Sessions
- 1st: December 2020 – February 2021
- 2nd: February 2021 – September 2021
- 3rd: September 2021 – February 2022
- 4th: February 2022 – September 2022
- 5th: February 2023 – September 2023
- 6th: February 2024 – September 2024

The 2020–2024 legislature of the Romanian Parliament was legislature of the Parliament of Romania, elected on 6 December 2020. In the said election, no party won an outright majority, but the Social Democratic Party (PSD) remained the largest political force in the parliament, in opposition however. The National Liberal Party (PNL), the Save Romania Union (USR), and the Democratic Alliance of Hungarians in Romania (UDMR/RMDSZ) formed a coalition government. The USR ran within a political alliance it established with a smaller party, more specifically the Freedom, Unity and Solidarity Party (PLUS), which was eventually absorbed by the former. The Alliance for the Union of Romanians (AUR) entered parliament starting this legislature with an unexpected high score, gaining more popularity ever since.

The PNL-USR-PLUS-UDMR/RMDSZ coalition was dissolved in early September 2021 following dispute over the so-called Anghel Saligny program and subsequent ousting of Justice Minister Stelian Ion (USR) by Prime Minister Florin Cîțu (PNL). This led to a months-long political crisis until the National Coalition for Romania (consisting of PSD, PNL, and UDMR/RMDSZ) was formed in late November 2021, forming the incumbent Ciucă Cabinet. The crisis also led to a PNL splinter, more specifically the Force of the Right (FD).

== Chamber of Deputies ==
The President of the Chamber of Deputies for this legislature was initially Ludovic Orban (PNL) from December 2020 until his resignation in October 2021. Since 23 November 2021, the office had been held by Marcel Ciolacu (PSD).

Between Orban's and Ciolacu's terms, there were two acting Chamber presidents: Florin Roman and Sorin Grindeanu.

Seats in the Chamber of Deputies of Romania
Party	Election seating		Lost	Won	Present seating	
Party	Seats	%	Lost	Won	Seats	%
Social Democratic Party	110	33.33%	6	1	105	31.81%
National Liberal Party	93	28.18%	16	2	79	23.93%
Save Romania Union	55	16.66%	0	0	55	16.66%
Alliance for the Union of Romanians	33	10%	5	1	29	8.78%
Democratic Alliance of Hungarians in Romania	21	6.36%	1	0	20	6.06%
Parties of ethnic minorities	18	5.45%	0	0	18	5.45%
Force of the Right	—	—	1	14	13	3.93%
Social Liberal Humanist Party	—	—	0	4	4	1.21%
Independents	—	—	0	3	3	0.90%
Romanian Nationhood Party	—	—	0	1	1	0.73%
Alliance for the Homeland	—	—	0	1	1	0.73%
Total	330	100	—		330	100

Notes:

^{1} FD did not exist at the time of the 2020 legislative elections. All deputies were elected on PNL's list.

^{2} All deputies of PUSL were elected on PSD's list.

^{3} The PNR deputy was elected on AUR's list.

== Senate ==
The President of the Senate for this legislature was initially Anca Dragu (USR), from December 2020 until her removal from office on 23 November 2021, being shortly afterwards replaced by Florin Cîțu (PNL).

Seats in the Senate of Romania
Party	Election seating		Lost	Won	Present seating	
Party	Seats	%	Lost	Won	Seats	%
Social Democratic Party	47	34.55%	1	0	46	33.82%
National Liberal Party	41	30.14%	3	0	38	27.94%
Save Romania Union	25	18.38%	0	0	25	18.38%
Alliance for the Union of Romanians	14	10.29%	1	0	13	9.56%
Democratic Alliance of Hungarians in Romania	9	6.61%	0	0	9	6.61%
Force of the Right^{1}	—	—	0	3	3	2.20%
Social Liberal Humanist Party^{2}	—	—	0	1	1	0.73%
Romanian Nationhood Party^{3}	—	—	0	1	1	0.73%
Total	136	100	—		136	100

Notes:

^{1} FD did not exist at the time of the 2020 legislative elections. All senators were elected on PNL's list.

^{2} The PUSL senator was elected on PSD's list.

^{3} The PNR senator was elected on AUR's list.

== See also ==
- Parliament of Romania
- Politics of Romania
- List of members of the Chamber of Deputies of Romania (2020–2024)
