= Ștefan-Ovidiu Popa =

Romanian politician (born 1985)

Minister of Transport and Infrastructure
- Incumbent
- Assumed office 20 October 2026
- Prime Minister: Luca Niculescu
- Preceded by: Radu Miruță (acting)

Personal details
- Born: 25 June 1985 (age 41) Drăgășani, Romania
- Party: Social Democratic Party

Ștefan-Ovidiu Popa (born 25 June 1985) is a Romanian politician serving as minister of transport and infrastructure since 2026. He has been a member of the Chamber of Deputies since 2016.
