= Radu Marinescu =

Romanian politician (born 1959)

Minister of Justice
- Incumbent
- Assumed office 20 October 2026
- Prime Minister: Luca Niculescu
- Preceded by: Cătălin Predoiu (acting)
- In office 23 December 2024 – 25 April 2026
- Prime Minister: Marcel Ciolacu; Cătălin Predoiu (acting); Ilie Bolojan
- Preceded by: Alina Gorghiu
- Succeeded by: Cătălin Predoiu (acting)

Member of the Chamber of Deputies
- Incumbent
- Assumed office 20 December 2024
- Constituency: Dolj

Personal details
- Party: Social Democratic Party

Radu Marinescu is a Romanian lawyer and politician serving as a member of the Chamber of Deputies since 2024. From 2020 to 2024, he was a municipal councillor of Craiova.
