= PSD–PNL Alliance =

Generic name for Romanian political alliances

The Social Democratic Party (PSD) and the National Liberal Party (PNL) are two of the major political parties in Romania. They have formed multiple alliances with each other in modern Romanian history:

- The Social Liberal Union (USL), 2011–2014
- The National Coalition for Romania (CNR), 2021–2025
- The Romania Forward Electoral Alliance (A.RO), 2025
