= Simona Bucura-Oprescu =

Romanian politician and economist

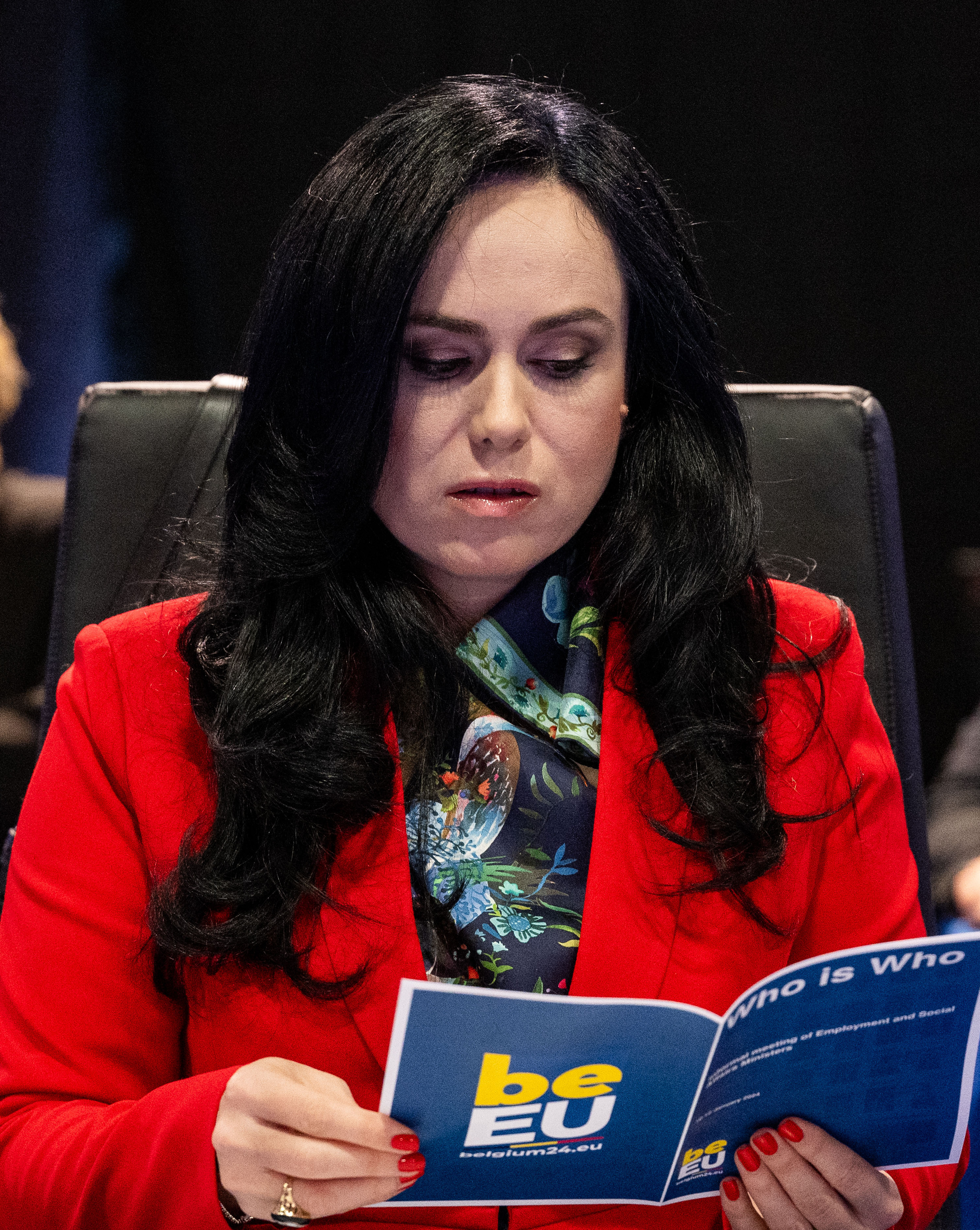
- Bucura-Oprescu in 2024

Minister of Labor and Social Solidarity
- In office 19 July 2023 – 23 June 2025
- Prime Minister: Marcel Ciolacu
- Preceded by: Marius-Constantin Budăi
- Succeeded by: Florin Manole

Personal details
- Born: February 2, 1980 (age 46) Câmpulung, Romania
- Party: Social Democratic Party (SDP)
- Education: Jagiellonian University

Simona Bucura-Oprescu (born 2 April 1980) is a Romanian politician from the Social Democratic Party (PSD).

On 19 July 2023, she was sworn in as Minister of Labor and Social Solidarity in the Ciolacu Cabinet.

She has been elected to the Chamber of Deputies in 2012, 2016 and 2020 for the Argeș County and is the president of the Commission for Public Administration and Territorial Planning since 22 December 2020.
