= Radu Mihail =

Romanian politician (born 1969)

Member of the Senate
- Incumbent
- Assumed office 21 December 2016
- Constituency: Romanian diaspora

Personal details
- Born: 8 April 1969 (age 57)
- Party: Save Romania Union

Radu-Mihai Mihail (born 8 April 1969) is a Romanian politician of the Save Romania Union serving as a member of the Senate. He was first elected in the 2016 parliamentary election, and was re-elected in 2020. He serves as leader of the Save Romania Union in the Senate.
