= Ciprian-Constantin Șerban =

Romanian politician (born 1985)

Minister of Transport and Infrastructure
- In office 23 June 2025 – 25 April 2026
- Prime Minister: Ilie Bolojan
- Preceded by: Sorin Grindeanu
- Succeeded by: Radu Miruță (acting)

President of the Chamber of Deputies of Romania
- In office 23 December 2024 – 23 June 2025
- Preceded by: Vasile-Daniel Suciu
- Succeeded by: Sorin Grindeanu

Member of the Chamber of Deputies
- Incumbent
- Assumed office 21 December 2016
- Constituency: Neamț

Personal details
- Born: 22 December 1985 (age 40)
- Party: Social Democratic Party

Ciprian-Constantin Șerban (born 22 December 1985) is a Romanian politician of the Social Democratic Party. He has been a member of the Chamber of Deputies since 2016. Since 2023, he has served as group leader of the Social Democratic Party in the chamber.
