= Crin Antonescu =

Romanian politician and history teacher (born 1959)

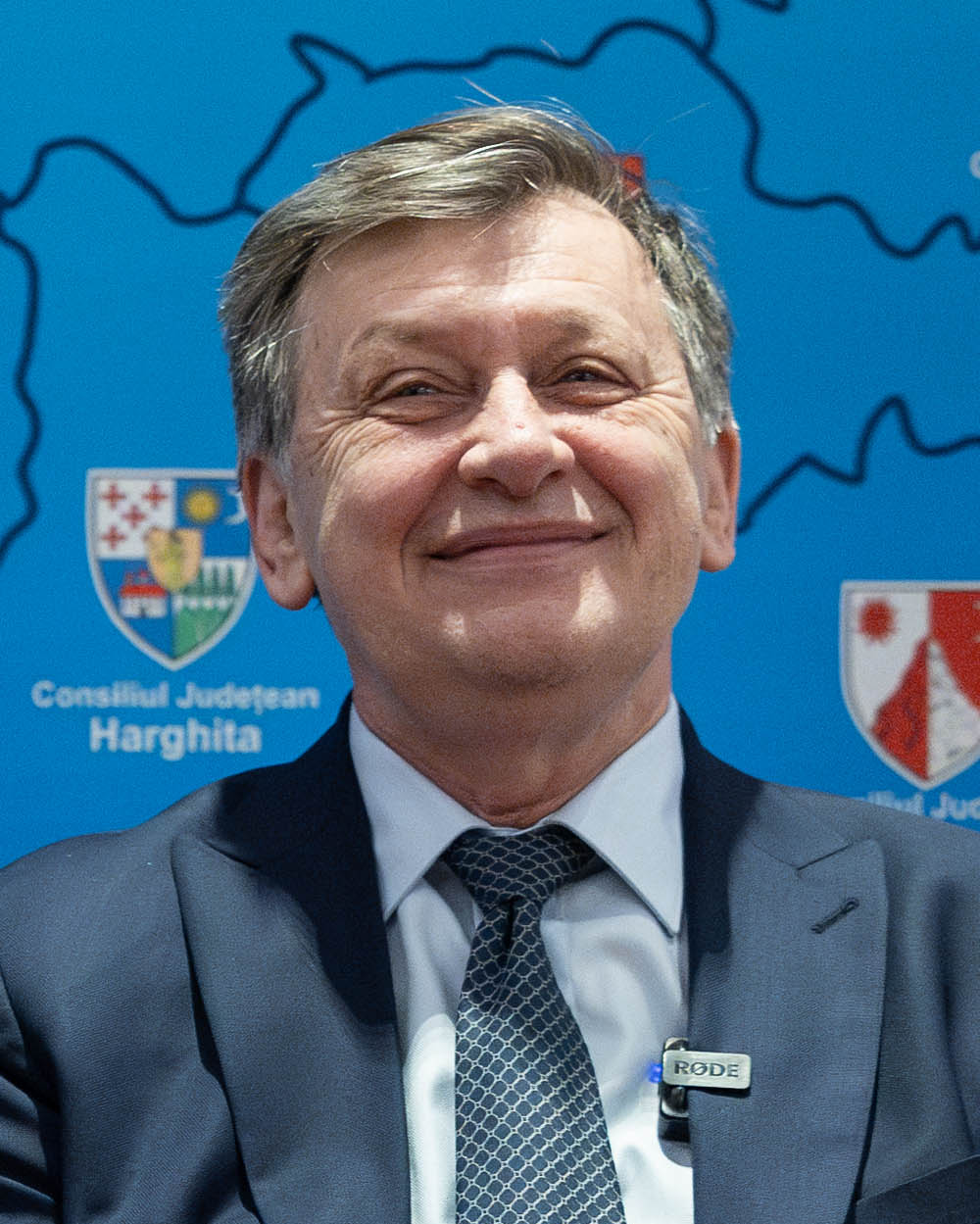
- Antonescu in 2025

Acting President of Romania^{[a]}
- In office 10 July 2012 – 27 August 2012
- Prime Minister: Victor Ponta
- Preceded by: Traian Băsescu
- Succeeded by: Traian Băsescu

President of the Senate of Romania
- In office 3 July 2012 – 4 March 2014
- President: Traian Băsescu
- Preceded by: Vasile Blaga
- Succeeded by: Călin Popescu-Tăriceanu

Leader of the National Liberal Party
- In office 20 March 2009 – 31 May 2014
- Preceded by: Călin Popescu-Tăriceanu
- Succeeded by: Klaus Iohannis

Minister of Youth and Sport
- In office 5 December 1997 – 28 December 2000
- Prime Minister: Victor Ciorbea; Gavril Dejeu (Acting); Radu Vasile; Alexandru Athanasiu (Acting); Mugur Isărescu
- Preceded by: Mihai-Sorin Stănescu
- Succeeded by: Georgiu Gingăraș

Member of the Senate of Romania
- In office 19 December 2012 – 16 December 2016
- Constituency: Teleorman County
- In office 15 December 2008 – 18 December 2012
- Constituency: Bucharest

Member of the Chamber of Deputies
- In office 13 December 2004 – 14 December 2008
- Constituency: Bucharest
- In office 1996 – 12 December 2004
- Constituency: Teleorman County
- In office 16 October 1992 – 1996
- Constituency: Tulcea County

Personal details
- Born: 21 September 1959 (age 67) Tulcea, Romania
- Party: Independent
- Other political affiliations: Civic Alliance Party (1992–1993); Liberal Party 1993 (1993–1995); Independent (1995–1996); PNL (1996–2025) (Note: He temporarily suspended his membership in the PNL during his tenure as acting President, in accordance with constitutional requirements.); Romania Forward Electoral Alliance (2025)
- Spouse(s): Aurelia Antonescu (died 2004) Adina-Ioana Vălean (m. 2009)
- Children: Irina Antonescu
- Education: University of Bucharest
- a. During the second impeachment trial of President Traian Băsescu

George Crin Laurențiu Antonescu (Romanian: [ˈdʒe̯ordʒe ˈkrin la.uˈrentsju antoˈnesku]; born 21 September 1959) is a Romanian politician and history teacher who served as Acting President of Romania in 2012. He was also candidate in the 2009 and 2025 presidential elections, finishing both in third place.

Before and after his brief acting presidency, Antonescu was Member of the Chamber of Deputies from 1992 to 2008, Minister of Youth and Sport from 1997 to 2000, Member of the Senate from 2008 to 2016, President of the National Liberal Party (PNL) from 2009 to 2014, as well as President of the Senate from 2012 to 2014.

Antonescu became Acting President of Romania on 10 July 2012, a few days after President Traian Băsescu was suspended for a second time, and ended his term on 27 August the same year. He continued as President of the Senate until March 2014, after which he slowly withdrew from politics before unsuccessfully returning as the A.Ro candidate in the 2025 presidential election.

== Early life and education ==
Antonescu was born in Tulcea, Tulcea County, Socialist Republic of Romania. After his parents' divorce, he was raised by his father who encouraged him to attend the Faculty of History and Philosophy at the University of Bucharest, in order to become a history teacher.

== Professional career ==
Upon graduating in 1985, Crin Antonescu worked as a History teacher in the village of Solești, Vaslui County. He later returned to Tulcea, continuing his teaching activity in Niculițel until 1989. Antonescu worked as a curator for the Tulcea Museum of History and Archaeology from 1989 to 1990, when he resumed his teaching activity at the "Spiru Haret" High School in Tulcea, prior to being elected to the Chamber of Deputies.

== Political career ==
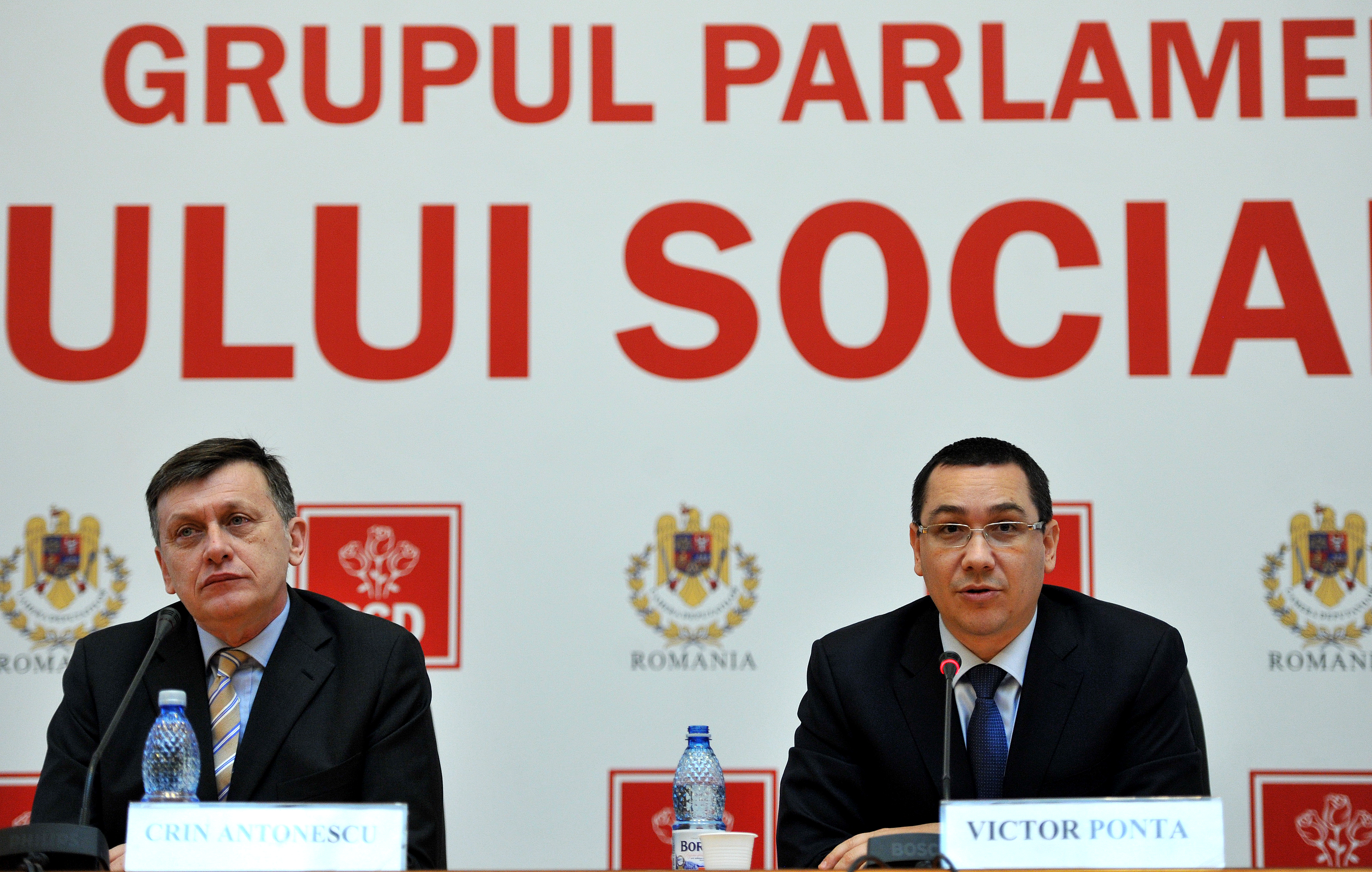
Antonescu and Victor Ponta in 2013

Upon joining the National Liberal Party (PNL), Antonescu helped organize the Tulcea branch of the party. In 1995, he was elected PNL Vice President and, subsequently, leader of the liberal politicians active in the Chamber of Deputies, holding that position for two non-consecutive mandates. During his activity in the Chamber of Deputies, he was a member of the Committee for Education, Youth, and Sports, the Foreign Affairs Committee and the Committee of Culture, Arts, and Media.

Antonescu was the Romanian Minister of Youth and Sports from 1997 to 2000. He initiated a series of reforms, the most prominent being the legal perpetuity for Romanian athletes with significant Olympic results.

As of 20 March 2009, Antonescu was the President of the National Liberal Party (PNL), in addition to being the party's candidate for the 2009 presidential elections in Romania. In September 2009, Antonescu was situated third in Romanians' voting preferences for the 2009 Presidential elections.

After President Traian Băsescu's suspension on 3 July 2012, he assumed acting Presidency of Romania. After the end of the ad interim term as President of Romania, Antonescu continued to serve as Senate President until the dissolution of USL, after which he resigned from this dignity. After 2014, he slowly but steadily withdrew from politics, resigning from his last remaining political position in late February 2015.

Antonescu was selected as the presidential candidate for the 2025 presidential election by the incumbent minority government under the electoral pact Romania Forward Electoral Alliance. Antonescu placed third in the first round of voting on 4 May with 20.34% of the vote.

Presidential styles of Crin Antonescu
- Reference style: Președintele interimar (ad interim President)
- Spoken style: Președintele interimar (ad interim President)
- Alternative style: Domnia Sa/Excelența Sa (His Excellency)

== Personal life ==
Antonescu's first wife Aurelia committed suicide in 2004 due to an incurable disease. The two have a daughter, Irina, born in 2001. In June 2009, Antonescu announced he will get married again to party colleague Adina Vălean. The couple got married on 25 September 2009.

== Electoral history ==
=== Presidential elections ===
Election	Affiliation	First round			Second round		
Election	Affiliation	Votes	Percentage	Position	Votes	Percentage	Position
2009	PNL	1,945,831	20.02%	3rd	not qualified		
2025	A.Ro	1,892,930	20.07%	3rd	not qualified		

== Notes ==
Political offices
Preceded by Mihai-Sorin Stănescu	Minister of Youth and Sport; 1997–2000	Succeeded by Georgiu Gingăraș
Preceded by Vasile Blaga	President of the Romanian Senate; 2012–2014	Succeeded by Călin Popescu-Tăriceanu
Preceded by Traian Băsescu	President of Romania; Acting; 2012	Succeeded by Traian Băsescu
Party political offices
Preceded by Călin Popescu-Tăriceanu	Leader of the National Liberal Party; 2009–2014	Succeeded by Klaus Iohannis
