= Florin-Ionuț Barbu =

Romanian politician (born 1980)

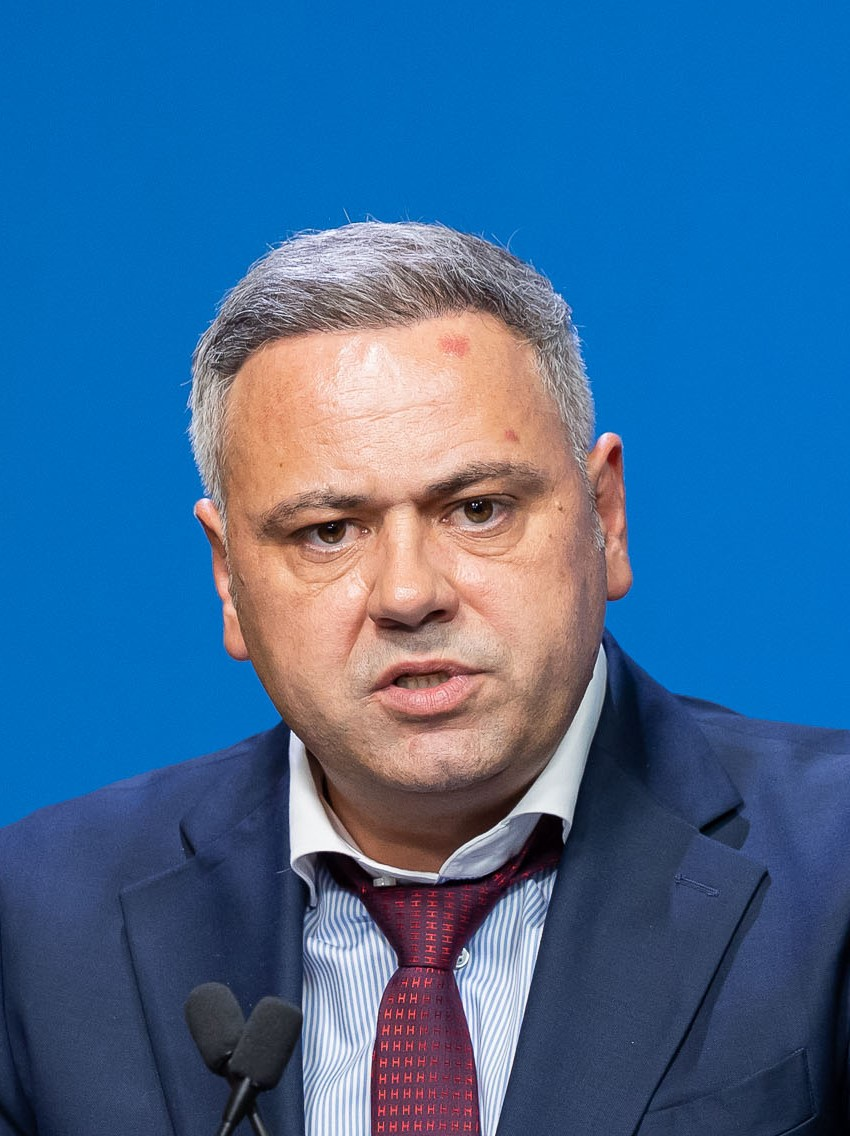
- Barbu in 2023

Minister of Agriculture and Rural Development
- Incumbent
- Assumed office 20 October 2026
- Prime Minister: Luca Niculescu
- Preceded by: Barna Tánczos (acting)
- In office 15 June 2023 – 25 April 2026
- Prime Minister: Marcel Ciolacu; Cătălin Predoiu (acting); Ilie Bolojan
- Preceded by: Petre Daea
- Succeeded by: Barna Tánczos (acting)

Member of the Chamber of Deputies
- Incumbent
- Assumed office 21 December 2020
- Constituency: Olt

Personal details
- Born: 4 September 1980 (age 46)
- Party: Social Democratic
- Education: University of Craiova

Florin-Ionuț Barbu (born 4 September 1980) is a Romanian politician of the Social Democratic Party. Since 2023, he has served as minister of agriculture and rural development. He was elected member of the Chamber of Deputies in the 2020 parliamentary election, and chaired the agriculture committee from 2021 to 2023.
