= National Coalition for Romania =

Grand coalition in Romania

National Coalition for Romania Coaliția Națională pentru România
- Founder: Florin Cîțu; Rareș Bogdan; Marcel Ciolacu; Hunor Kelemen; Varujan Pambuccian
- Founded: 25 November 2021 (as CNR); 19 February 2025 (as A.RO)
- Dissolved: 5 May 2025
- Ideology: Economic patriotism Social conservatism
- Political position: Big tent
- Colours: Orange (2021–2025); Turquoise (February–May 2025)
- Slogan: Stabilitate și dezvoltare ! ('Stability and Development!')
- Constituent parties: PSD; PNL; UDMR/RMDSZ (2021–23; 2024–25)

Website
- stabilitate.ro

The National Coalition for Romania (Romanian: Coaliția Națională pentru România, CNR), initially referred to as the Coalition for Resilience, Development and Prosperity (Romanian: Coaliția pentru Reziliență, Dezvoltare și Prosperitate, CRDP), was a big tent grand coalition in Romania, which included the Social Democratic Party (PSD) and the National Liberal Party (PNL). The CNR also included the Democratic Union of Hungarians in Romania (UDMR/RMDSZ) with a short break.

== History ==
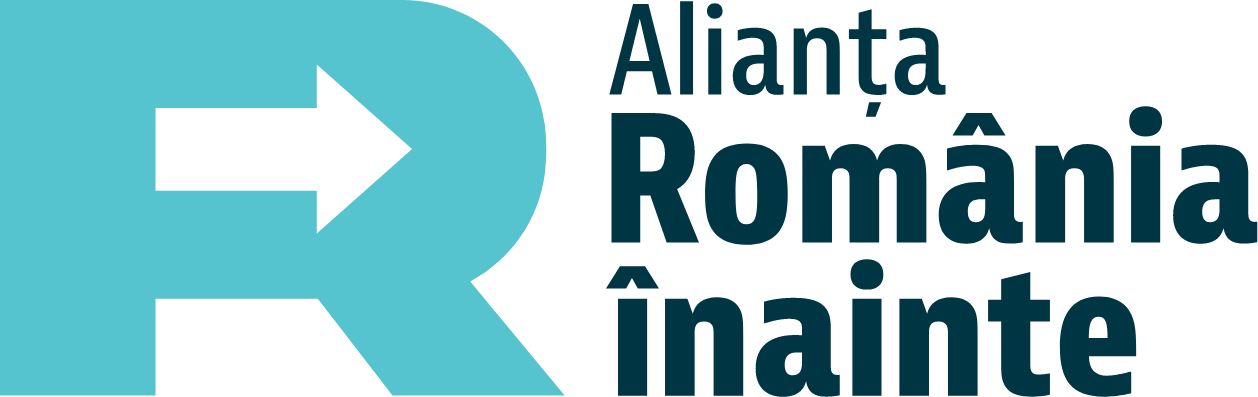
Logo of Romania Forward Electoral Alliance (February-May 2025)

After the 2021 Romanian political crisis, PNL, PSD, and UDMR/RMDSZ reached an agreement to rule the country together through a grand coalition for the next seven years. Thus, it was agreed that the prime minister of Romania and several other important ministries should be changed every year and a half. Consequently, the first prime minister to be appointed was Nicolae Ciucă of PNL. Ciucă Cabinet was sworn in on 25 November, the day Florin Cîțu, Rareș Bogdan, Marcel Ciolacu, Hunor Kelemen, and Varujan Pambuccian founded the coalition. Up until the swearing in of Ciucă's cabinet, it was referred to as the CRDP. On 23 November 2021, Marcel Ciolacu (PSD) was elected president of the Chamber of Deputies. On the same day, Anca Dragu (USR) was dismissed as Senate of Romania chairman, being replaced by the former prime minister Florin Cîțu (PNL). In early 2022, the coalition's activity was praised by Iohannis, who is the incumbent president of Romania, stating that "the Romanian political class has shown democratic maturity".

On 12 June 2023, according to the protocol of the CNR, Ciucă resigned. The next day, Iohannis designated Marcel Ciolacu to be the next prime minister. Ciucă became the president of the Senate of Romania on 13 June 2023. UDMR also withdrew from the coalition after PNL decided to take the Minister of Development, Public Works and Administration, which was held by UDMR in the Ciucă Cabinet. On 15 June 2023, the Parliament of Romania voted the Ciolacu Cabinet. Iohannis praised the new PSD-PNL coalition, saying that this new model implemented in Romanian politics, in reference to the government rotation, "has worked very well so far". He also declared that "the fact that today we are here to formalize the rotation of the prime ministers shows a new level of seriousness of the coalition." According to the World Press Freedom Index, the freedom of the press in Romania declined during Ciucă's premiership, from 75.09 in 2021 to 69.04 in 2023.

After the 2024 Romanian parliamentary election Marcel Ciolacu's Second Cabinet was sworned with the rejoining of UDMR/RMDSZ. On 19 February 2025, the grand coalition was succeeded by the Romania Forward Electoral Alliance for supporting the presidency of Crin Antonescu. It was a social conservative electoral alliance in Romania, consisting of the Social Democratic Party (PSD), the National Liberal Party (PNL) and the Democratic Union of Hungarians in Romania (UDMR).

The alliance supported the candidacy of former PNL leader Crin Antonescu during the 2025 Romanian presidential election, where he finished third with 20.07% vote. Following the results, Prime Minister Marcel Ciolacu announced that PSD would leave the coalition and resigned from the position of Prime Minister, which resulted in the coalition falling.

== Ideology ==
Although they have opposing ideologies, both PSD and PNL claim to have formed a reformist-minded alliance. The parties in the coalition have been variously described as taking an overall comparatively state-oriented and conservative approach, the main common idea of the two being economic patriotism.

While former PSD and PNL rivals claim to have made the alliance in the interest of the people, there was heavy criticism of both parties because they promised not to form an alliance with each other. Iohannis, who is rumored to be the coalition's architect, was sharply criticized because, between 2018 and 2020, he had repeatedly criticized PSD, then brought it back to government. At one point, PNL president Florin Cîțu stated: "Our [PNL's] former [coalition] partners [the USR] shook hands with the PSD, [and] they didn't want to shake hands with us [the PNL] anymore."

Critics called the coalition the second monstrous coalition, or USL 2.0, as well as kleptocratic, authoritarian, autocratic, illiberal, and corrupt. Ludovic Orban, former PNL president and prime minister, has seen the coalition as a "danger for Romanian democracy". According to the Freedom House, Romania experienced "democratic backsliding" during Ciucă's premiership, with The Economist ranking it last in the European Union in terms of democracy, behind the democratic backsliding under Viktor Orbán.

In the 2024 The Economist Democracy Index, Romania was downgraded from flawed democracy to a hybrid regime, becoming the only EU country to be classified as such.

== Electoral history ==
On 21 February 2024, PNL and PSD announced in a joint declaration that they would participate together in the 2024 European Parliament election in Romania.

=== European election ===
Election	Votes	%	Seats	Position	EU party	EP group
2024	4,341,686	48.55	19 / 33	1st ^{1}	PES/EPP	S&D/EPP Group

Note: ^{1} National Coalition for Romania members: PSD (11 MEPs) and PNL (8 MEPs).

=== Presidential election ===
Election	Candidate	First round			Second round		
Election	Candidate	Votes	Percentage	Position	Votes	Percentage	Position
2025	Crin Antonescu	1,892,930	20.07%	3rd	not qualified		

== See also ==
- Social Liberal Union (USL), a similar political alliance active between 2011 and 2014
- Grand coalition
- PSD–PNL Alliance
