= Mircea Abrudean =

Romanian politician

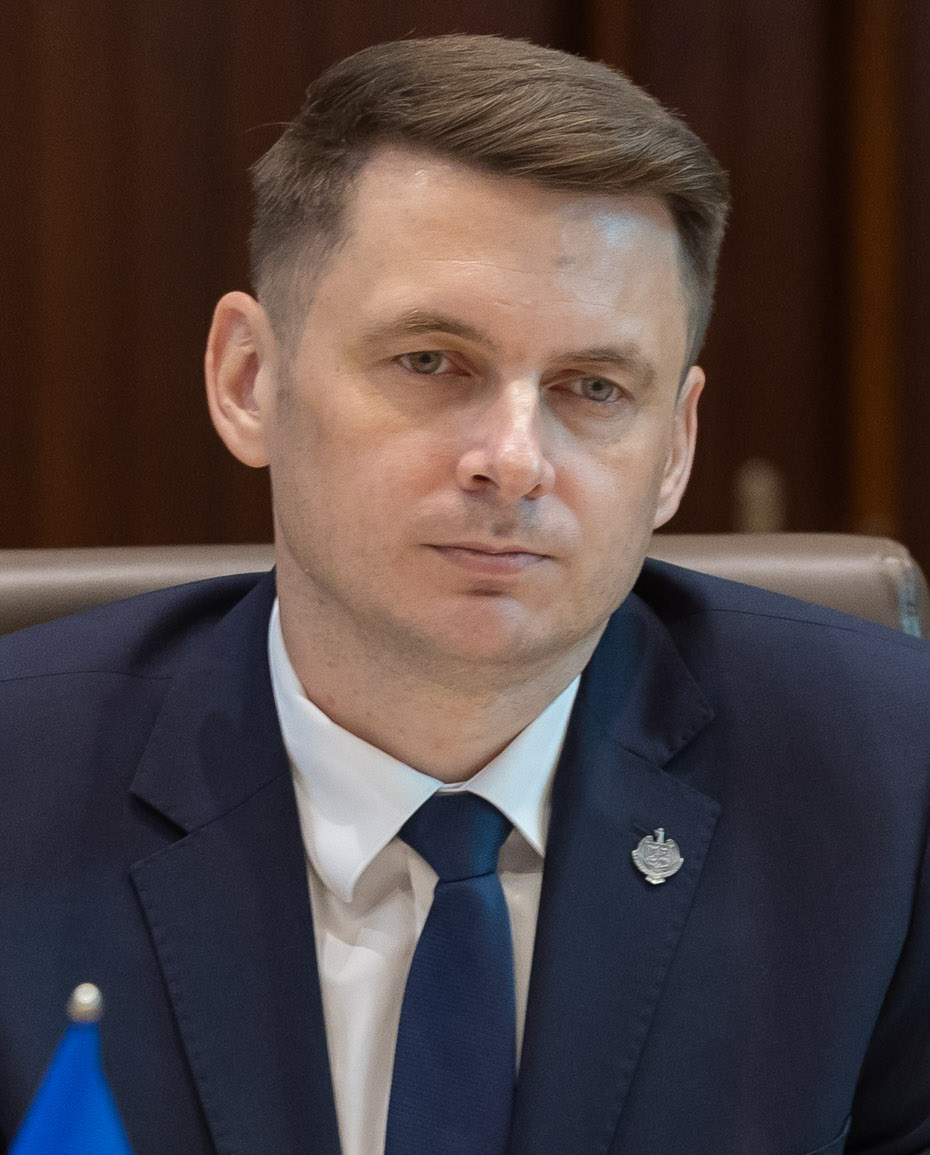
- Abrudean in 2025

President of the Senate
- Incumbent
- Assumed office 24 June 2025
- President: Nicușor Dan
- Preceded by: Ilie Bolojan
- Acting; 12 February 2025 – 26 May 2025
- President: Ilie Bolojan (acting)
- Preceded by: Ilie Bolojan
- Succeeded by: Ilie Bolojan

Secretary-General of the Romanian Government
- In office 15 June 2023 – 23 December 2024
- President: Klaus Iohannis; Ilie Bolojan (acting)
- Prime Minister: Marcel Ciolacu
- Preceded by: Marian Neacșu
- Succeeded by: Mihnea-Claudiu Drumea

Personal details
- Born: 23 July 1984 (age 41) Cluj-Napoca, Romania
- Party: National Liberal
- Spouse: Adina Abrudean
- Children: 1
- Education: Babeș-Bolyai University; National University of Political Studies and Public Administration

Mircea Abrudean (born 23 July 1984) is a Romanian politician who has been President of the Senate of Romania and in the senate as a member of the National Liberal Party since 2025. Prior to his tenure in the senate he was active in the local politics of Cluj County.

== Early life and education ==
Mircea Abrudean was born in Cluj-Napoca on 23 July 1984. From 1998 he attended the Petru Maior Theoretical High School in Gherla, graduating in 2002. He then studied at Babeș-Bolyai University in Cluj-Napoca, graduating with a bachelor's degree in international relations and European studies in 2006. He attended the National University of Political Studies and Public Administration from to 2007 to 2008, graduating with a master's degree in project management.

== Career ==
The Cluj County Council selected Abrudean to represent it in Brussels for the National Union of County Councils in 2006. He was head of the Senate Cabinet, a role in which managed relations with the media and carried out parliamentary interpellations, from 2009 to 2012. Abrudean was the Prefect of Cluj County from 2019 to 2021. On 3 February 2021, he became the Deputy Secretary General of the Government.

In the 2024 election Abrudean won a seat in the senate from the 13th district as a member of the National Liberal Party. During his tenure in the senate he served on the Energy, Energy Infrastructure and Mineral Resources, and the Human Rights, Equal Opportunities, Religions and Minorities committees. On 24 June 2025, he was elected president of the Senate.

== Personal life ==
Abrudean can speak Romanian, English, French, and German.

== Works cited ==
=== News ===
- "Mircea ABRUDEAN CV" (PDF). G4 Media. Archived (PDF) from the original on 11 December 2024.

=== Web ===
- "Mircea Abrudean". OECD. Archived from the original on 12 May 2025.
- "Mircea ABRUDEAN". Senate of Romania. Archived from the original on 27 June 2025.
