= Ciolacu cabinet =

Ciolacu Cabinet may refer to:

- First Ciolacu cabinet, 2023–2024
- Second Ciolacu Cabinet, 2024–2025
