= Marian Neacșu =

Romanian politician (born 1964)

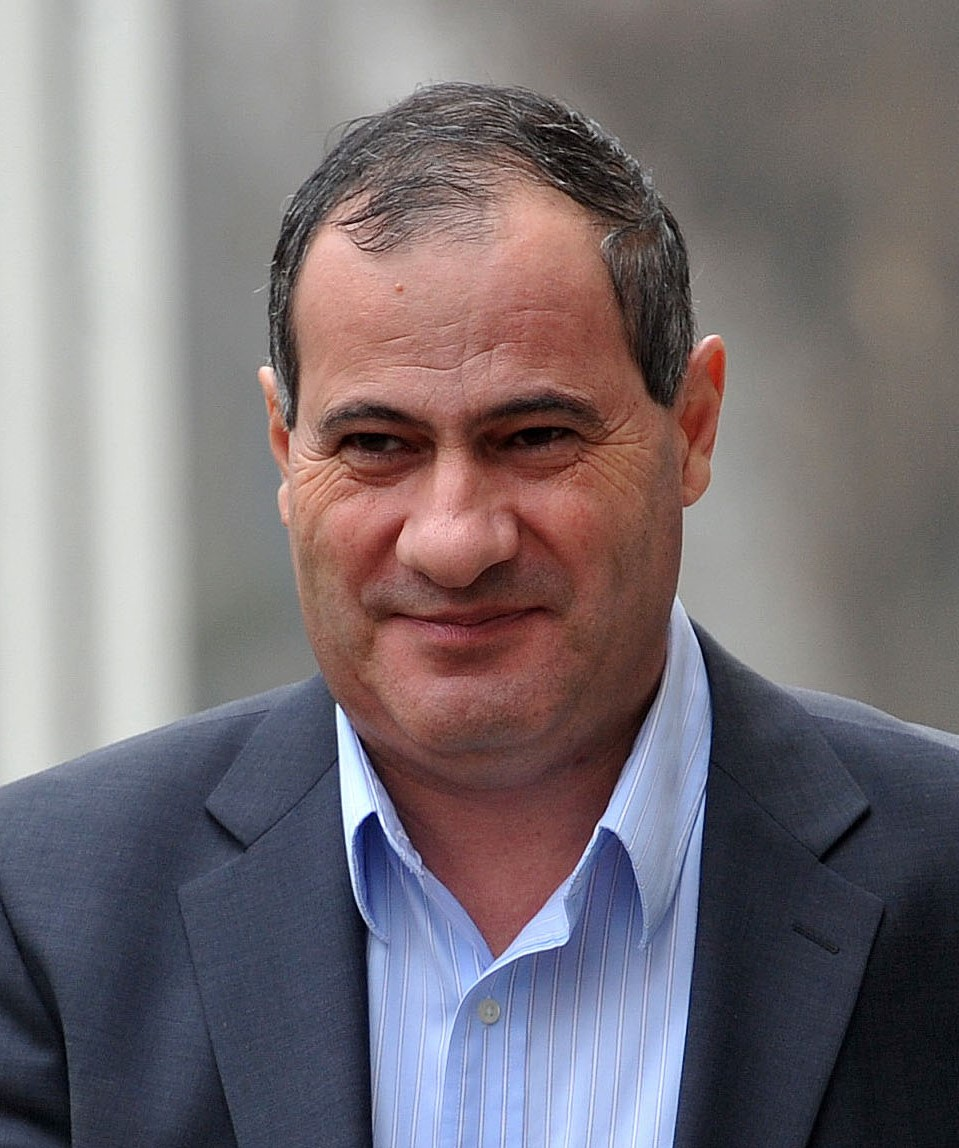
- Neacșu in 2014

Deputy Prime Minister of Romania
- Incumbent
- Assumed office 20 October 2026
- President: Nicușor Dan
- Prime Minister: Luca Niculescu
- Preceded by: Cătălin Predoiu; Radu Miruță; Barna Tánczos
- In office 15 June 2023 – 25 April 2026
- President: Klaus Iohannis; Ilie Bolojan (acting); Nicușor Dan
- Prime Minister: Marcel Ciolacu; Cătălin Predoiu (acting); Ilie Bolojan
- Preceded by: Sorin Grindeanu; Kelemen Hunor

Minister of Internal Affairs
- Incumbent
- Assumed office 20 October 2026
- Prime Minister: Luca Niculescu
- Preceded by: Cătălin Predoiu

Secretary-General of the Romanian Government
- In office 7 December 2021 – 15 June 2023
- President: Klaus Iohannis
- Prime Minister: Nicolae Ciucă; Cătălin Predoiu (acting)
- Preceded by: Tiberiu-Horațiu Gorun
- Succeeded by: Mircea Abrudean

Member of the Chamber of Deputies
- In office 2008–2016
- Constituency: Ialomița County

Personal details
- Born: 27 May 1964 (age 62) Coșereni, Romanian People's Republic
- Party: Social Democratic Party (until 2019; since 2021)
- Other political affiliations: PRO Romania (2019–21); Greater Romania Party (until early 2000s)
- Education: University of Craiova; Dimitrie Cantemir Christian University; Valahia University of Târgoviște
- Profession: economist

Marian Neacșu (Note: Romanian pronunciation: [maˈrian ˈne̯akʃu]) (born 27 May 1964) is a Romanian politician who was deputy in the Romanian Parliament in the 2008–2012 and 2012–2016 legislatures elected on behalf of the Social Democratic Party (PSD), Ialomița constituency. Between 7 December 2021 and 15 June 2023 he was the Secretary-General of the Ciucă Cabinet. On 15 June 2023 he became Deputy Prime Minister in the Ciolacu Cabinet.

== Criminal conviction ==
Neacșu was definitively sentenced to six months in prison with suspension for committing the crime of conflict of interest, in 2016. He illegally hired his daughter at his parliamentary office. This fact was brought back to public attention in November 2021, when he was proposed and subsequently appointed as Secretary General of the Government. On this occasion, Curentul claimed that in 2012 he facilitated the appointment of his wife in the position of general manager of the insurer PAID Romania, although he did not meet all the necessary conditions for this position.
