= Sorin Grindeanu =

President of the Chamber of Deputies of Romania

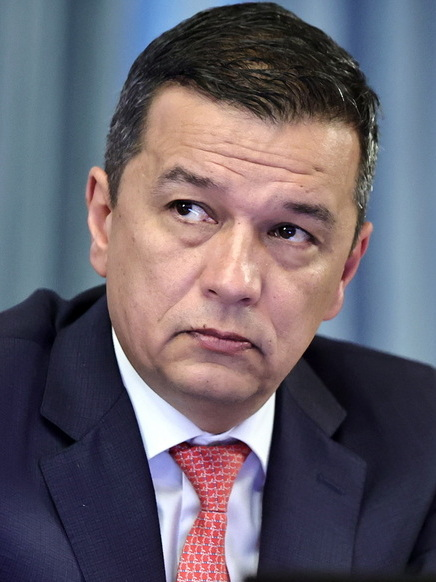
- Grindeanu in 2022

President of the Chamber of Deputies
- Incumbent
- Assumed office 24 June 2025
- President: Nicușor Dan
- Preceded by: Ciprian Șerban
- Acting; 2 November 2021 – 23 November 2021
- President: Klaus Iohannis
- Preceded by: Florin Roman (acting)
- Succeeded by: Marcel Ciolacu

Prime Minister of Romania
- In office 4 January 2017 – 29 June 2017
- President: Klaus Iohannis
- Preceded by: Dacian Cioloș
- Succeeded by: Mihai Tudose

Deputy Prime Minister of Romania
- In office 25 November 2021 – 15 June 2023 Serving with Hunor Kelemen
- President: Klaus Iohannis
- Prime Minister: Nicolae Ciucă
- Preceded by: Dan Barna
- Succeeded by: Marian Neacșu; Cătălin Predoiu

Leader of the Social Democratic Party
- Incumbent
- Assumed office 20 May 2025 (Note: Acting: 20 May – 7 November 2025)
- Preceded by: Marcel Ciolacu
Ministerial positions
Minister of Transport and Infrastructure
In office 25 November 2021 – 23 June 2025
Prime Minister	Nicolae Ciucă; Marcel Ciolacu; Cătălin Predoiu (Acting)
Preceded by	Dan Vîlceanu (acting)
Succeeded by	Ciprian Șerban
Minister of Communications
In office 17 December 2014 – 17 November 2015
Prime Minister	Victor Ponta
Preceded by	Răzvan Cotovelea
Succeeded by	Marius Bostan

Member of the Chamber of Deputies
- Incumbent
- Assumed office 21 December 2020
- Constituency: Timiș County
- In office 19 December 2012 – 26 June 2016
- Constituency: Timiș County
Local offices
President of the Timiș County Council
In office 26 June 2016 – 4 January 2017
Preceded by	Titu Bojin
Succeeded by	Călin-Ionel Dobra
Deputy Mayor of Timișoara
In office June 2008 – December 2012
Mayor	Gheorghe Ciuhandu
Member of the Local Council of Timișoara
In office June 2004 – June 2008
Mayor	Gheorghe Ciuhandu

Personal details
- Born: Sorin Mihai Grindeanu; 5 December 1973 (age 52) Caransebeș, Caraș-Severin County, Romania
- Party: Social Democratic Party
- Spouse: Mihaela Grindeanu
- Children: 2
- Education: West University of Timișoara

Sorin Mihai Grindeanu (Note: Romanian pronunciation: [soˈrin miˈhaj ɡrinˈde̯anu]) (born 5 December 1973) is a Romanian politician who has served as President of the Chamber of Deputies since 24 June 2025 previously holding the office ad interim in November 2021. Grindeanu is president of the Social Democratic Party (PSD) since 7 November 2025, after previously holding the position in acting capacity from May to November 2025. He served as Prime Minister of Romania from January to June 2017 when he was removed by a motion of no confidence adopted by the Parliament. He served as Deputy Prime Minister of Romania during the Ciucă Cabinet, along with Hunor Kelemen.

Grindeanu was a member of the Chamber of Deputies from 2012 until the June 2016 local election, when he became president of the Timiș County Council.

A member of the Social Democratic Party (PSD), he was nominated by the leader of the party, Liviu Dragnea, on 28 December 2016 to form a new government after the party won the legislative election of the previous year in a landslide. Two days later, President Klaus Iohannis officially appointed him as prime minister. He assumed office on 4 January 2017. He was also Minister for Communications under the fourth cabinet of Victor Ponta, between 17 December 2014 and 17 November 2015.

In early 2017, his government adopted a decree decriminalising certain official misconduct, sparking widespread protests.

== Early life and studies ==
Born on 5 December 1973, in Caransebeș, Grindeanu is the only child of Ana and Nicolae Grindeanu. Both of his parents were teachers, his father having been headmaster at the Constantin Diaconovici Loga National College, a high school in Caransebeș and a school inspector of the Caraș-Severin County. Nicolae Grindeanu also entered politics, having served as leader of the local organisation of the Social Democratic Party (PSD) in Caransebeș and currently serving a term as county councillor in the Caraș-Severin local council.

Starting in 1992, Grindeanu attended the West University of Timișoara where he received a degree in Mathematics and Informatics after graduating in 1997. In 1999 he attended the University of Bologna for three months under a TEMPUS scholarship and received a degree in Social statistics. He has also received degrees in various fields from the Institute for Adult Education in Frankfurt, the University of Aveiro, and the Leeds Beckett University.

In 2013 he received a postgraduate degree in Military science, Information and Public Order from the National Intelligence Academy.

== Political career ==
Grindeanu entered politics in November 1996 as a member of the Partidul Democrației Sociale din România (Party of Social Democracy of Romania), which would be later renamed the Social Democratic Party, following its merger with another minor left-wing party and becoming a member of the Socialist International. Two years later, in October 1998, he became Vice President of the Youth Organisation of the party in Timiș and in October 2002 he was promoted to the county executive bureau of the party. Throughout the early 2000s he continued to climb the ranks of the party, becoming a prominent member of the local organisation in Timiș and its president in December 2003. He made his entry into national politics in 2012 when he was elected for a four-years term as deputy in the Parliament of Romania. As MP, Grindeanu has co-authored several legislative initiatives on the fiscal code, social dialogue, the Labour Code, the functioning of owners' associations, individual insolvency, energy and gas laws or credit contracts for consumers. He has also supported a proposal for the chemical castration of those accused of paedophilia.

Grindeanu was appointed Minister of Communications on 17 December 2014 as part of the Ponta Cabinet, a position he held until the latter's resignation on 5 November 2015 and the subsequent dissolution of his government on 17 November 2015.

On 30 June 2016, Grindeanu resigned as MP to return to his home county of Timiș, where he was elected President of the local county council as part of a deal between the social-democrats, PMP, and ALDE.

=== As prime minister ===
==== Appointment ====
Following the electoral victory of the Social Democratic Party in the legislative election, Liviu Dragnea, the party's leader was set to become the next prime minister after he secured an alliance with former Prime Minister Călin Popescu-Tăriceanu's party and formed a parliamentary coalition. As per the Romanian constitution, after a legislative election, the President of Romania, after consulting all the parties in Parliament, has to designate an individual proposed by the coalition or the party that has an absolute majority in Parliament to become the next prime minister. President Iohannis had said before and after the election that he would not appoint an individual that was either prosecuted or convicted before, alluding to Dragnea's two-year suspended sentence in a case of electoral fraud. After exhausting all possible ways of removing his sentence, Dragnea decided to stop pursuing the premiership and nominated Sevil Shhaideh for the position. President Iohannis, however, refused to nominate Shhaideh, did not offer a reason for his refusal, and requested that the leaders of the majority coalition make another proposal. Had she been designated and sworn into office, Shhaideh would have been the first woman PM, the first PM from an ethnic minority and also the first PM from a religious minority.

Following the refusal, Dragnea mentioned a possible impeachment of the president, but ultimately decided to make another nomination. Grindeanu became the coalition's second proposal. President Iohannis designated Grindeanu as prime minister on 30 December 2016 and he was finally sworn in on 4 January 2017.

==== Ordinance Bill No. 13 ====
Early into his premiership, Grindeanu was faced with widespread protests all over the country after his government proposed an ordinance bill regarding the pardoning of certain committed crimes, and the amendment of the Penal Code of Romania to decriminalise abuse of power if the amount of money stolen was less than 200,000 RON. Despite the negative reactions from both the judicial institutions and the public, the newly sworn in government approved an ordinance modifying the Penal Code and Penal Procedure Code during the night of 31 January. Soon after a government meeting, the Ministry of Justice published the bills on its website and sent them to the relevant judicial institutions for consultations. The government's main stated reason for these bills was that prisons were overcrowded and in order to avoid paying a fine to the European Court of Human Rights, such measures were needed to improve the conditions in prisons. Opponents raised accusations that the ordinance was intended for decriminalisation of government corruption, and to help hundreds of current and former politicians to escape ongoing criminal investigations or prison sentences. Over the span of a few days, the protests had become the largest since the Romanian Revolution of 1989, with the number of protesters on the streets of Bucharest peaking to 600,000 on 5 February 2017. This prompted Grindeanu and his government to repeal the ordinance, and the Minister of Justice, Florin Iordache resigned on 9 February 2017.

==== Loss of political support ====
The relationship between Dragnea and Grindeanu slowly deteriorated starting April 2017 with sources pointing to the lack of trust between the two, the former believing the latter was interesting in creating a power pole in order to challenge his leadership. Dragnea later asked for Grindeanu's resignation as prime minister, which the latter refused. As a consequence, Dragnea convened the executive committee of the Social Democratic Party in order to review the cabinet's implementation of the governing programme with which the party won the legislative election back in 2016. Before the committee came to its conclusion, ALDE had already withdrawn its support of Grindeanu's Cabinet. Soon after Dragnea and PSD also withdrew their support and all the ministers resigned, leaving only Grindeanu as part of the government. Grindeanu refused to resign, citing his responsibility as Prime Minister of Romania. The coalition is expected to start a motion of no confidence against their own government in order to force Grindeanu out, sometime during June.

On 15 June 2017, Grindeanu was excluded from the Social Democratic Party by the executive committee of the PSD. Following Grindeanu's exclusion from the party, wings of the party and certain local organisations (Timiș and Iași) have declared their support for Grindeanu and former PM, Victor Ponta also joined his government as general secretary in spite of Dragnea's threats of exclusion from the party against all those who would abstain or vote against the motion of no confidence. On 21 June 2017, the motion of no confidence was passed by Parliament with 241 votes (233 were needed), thus ending Grindeanu's premiership.

== See also ==
- Grindeanu Cabinet

== Notes ==
Political offices
Preceded by Răzvan Cotovelea	Minister of Communications; 2014–2015	Succeeded by Marius Bostan
Preceded by Dacian Cioloș	Prime Minister of Romania; 2017	Succeeded by Mihai Tudose
Preceded by Dan Vîlceanu; Acting	Minister of Transport and Infrastructure; 2021–2025	Succeeded by Ciprian-Constantin Șerban
Preceded by Ciprian-Constantin Șerban	President of the Chamber of Deputies; 2025–present	Incumbent
Party political offices
Preceded by Marcel Ciolacu	President of the Social Democratic Party; Acting; 2025–present	Incumbent
