= Ilie Bolojan =

Prime Minister of Romania from 2025 to 2026

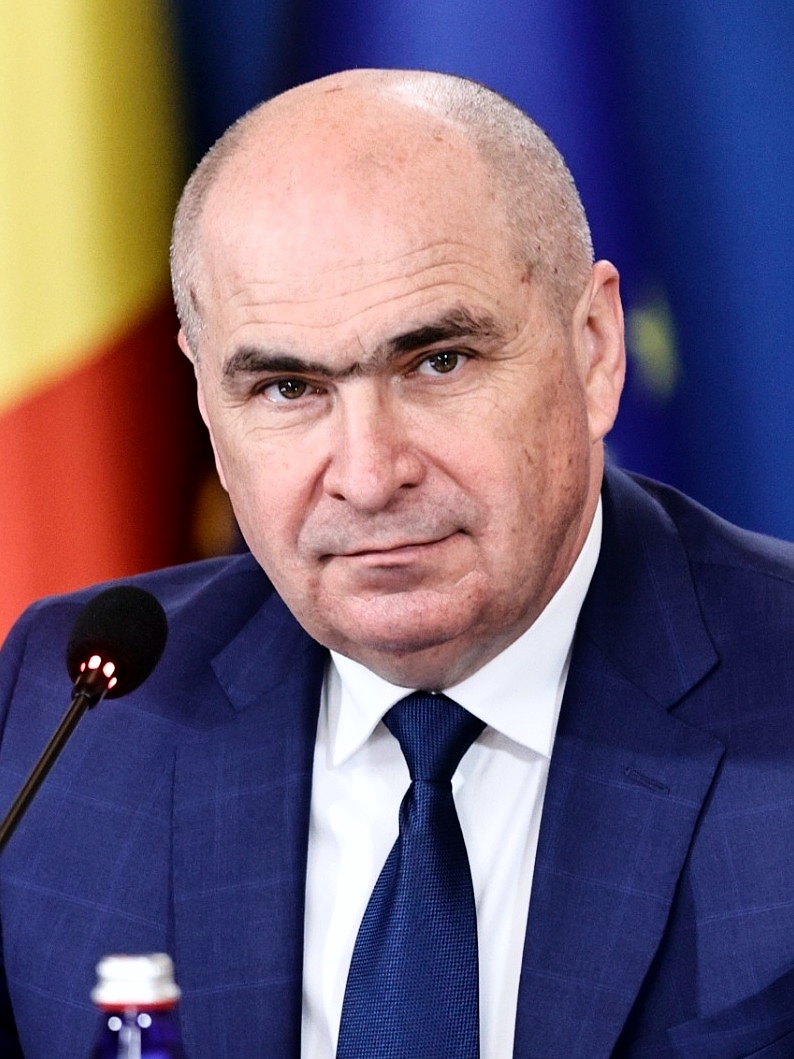
- Bolojan in 2026

Acting President of Romania
- In office 12 February 2025 – 26 May 2025
- Prime Minister: Marcel Ciolacu; Cătălin Predoiu (acting)
- Preceded by: Klaus Iohannis
- Succeeded by: Nicușor Dan

Prime Minister of Romania
- In office 23 June 2025 – 20 October 2026
- President: Nicușor Dan
- Deputy: Dragoș Anastasiu (2025); Liviu-Ionuț Moșteanu (2025); Marian Neacșu (2023–2026); Cătălin Predoiu; Barna Tánczos; Oana Gheorghiu
- Preceded by: Marcel Ciolacu Cătălin Predoiu (acting)
- Succeeded by: Luca Niculescu

President of the Senate of Romania
- In office 23 December 2024 – 24 June 2025 (Note: His term was suspended during his acting presidency in accordance with constitutional requirements. Thus, Mircea Abrudean served as acting president during this period.)
- President: Klaus Iohannis Nicușor Dan
- Preceded by: Nicolae Ciucă
- Succeeded by: Mircea Abrudean

Senator of Romania
- Incumbent
- Assumed office 20 December 2024
- Constituency: Bihor County

President of the National Liberal Party
- Incumbent
- Assumed office 25 November 2024 (Note: Acting: 25 November 2024 – 12 February 2025; 26 May – 12 July 2025)
- Preceded by: Nicolae Ciucă
Further offices held
President of the Bihor County Council
In office 19 October 2020 – 20 December 2024
Preceded by	Sándor Pásztor
Succeeded by	Mircea Mălan
Mayor of Oradea
In office 2008–2020
Preceded by	Mihai Groza
Succeeded by	Florin Birta
Prefect of Bihor County
In office 2005–2007

Personal details
- Born: Ilie Gavril Bolojan; 17 March 1969 (age 57) Vadu Crișului, Bihor County, Socialist Republic of Romania
- Party: National Liberal Party (1993–present)
- Spouse: Florentina Bolojan (m. 1988; div. 2013)
- Children: 2
- Education: West University of Timișoara; Politehnica University of Timișoara
- Profession: Politician

Ilie Gavril Bolojan (Note: Romanian pronunciation: [iˈli.e ɡaˈvril boloˈʒan].) (born 17 March 1969) is a Romanian politician who served as Prime Minister of Romania from 2025 to 2026. Previously, he served as the acting president of Romania in 2025, in his capacity as President of the Senate from 2024 to 2025.

Bolojan previously served as Mayor of Oradea and President of the Bihor County Council. Following the National Liberal Party's defeat in the first round of the later annulled 2024 Romanian presidential election, and the subsequent resignation of Nicolae Ciucă, Bolojan became the party's acting president and was elected president of the Senate of Romania.

On 12 February 2025, following the resignation of Klaus Iohannis, Bolojan became the acting president of Romania, serving until Nicușor Dan's inauguration on 26 May 2025 following his victory in the 2025 Romanian presidential election. During his acting presidency, his term as president of the Senate was suspended. On 20 June 2025, Bolojan was appointed as prime minister by President Dan and was sworn in on 23 June 2025. On 5 May 2026, his government fell after losing a vote of no-confidence, though he remained in office as a caretaker until Luca Niculescu took office on 20 October.

Ideologically described as social conservative, classical liberal, or right-libertarian, his government promoted austerity measures and endorsed a minarchist state. A polarizing figure, he is popular among the urban right-leaning and corporate voters for his staunch anti-social welfare stance, but has faced criticism from the lower and middle classes.

== Early life ==
Bolojan was born on 17 March 1969 in Vadu Crișului, a commune in Bihor County, in the Socialist Republic of Romania, as the son of Ilie and Floare. He is unrelated to Victor Bolojan, a high-ranking Communist politician (Central Committee member 1969–1979) and diplomat. Bolojan graduated from the Emanuil Gojdu Mathematics-Physics High School in Oradea and studied mechanics (1988–1993) at the Traian Vuia Polytechnic Institute in Timișoara and mathematics (1990–1993) at the West University of Timișoara. He became a member of the National Liberal Party (PNL) in 1993. During 1993–1994, he was a teacher at the Tileagd Auxiliary School.

== Political career ==
=== Beginnings (1996–2008) ===
Between 1996 and 2004, Ilie Bolojan was a local councilor of the town of Aleșd, and from 2004 a member of the Bihor County Council. In 2005 and 2006, he attended specialisation courses in public administration in France and at the National Institute of Administration in Bucharest. In the period 2005–2007, he was commissioner ('prefect') of Bihor County, and in the period 2007–2008 he held the position of secretary general of the Government.

=== Mayor of Oradea (2008–2020) ===
In 2008, Bolojan was elected mayor of the municipality of Oradea with 50.37% of the vote, becoming the first mayor of the city elected in the first round after 1989. He started a program of administrative and economic reforms, modernising the infrastructure, rehabilitating the historic center and attracting investors, thus Oradea became more attractive from an economic and tourist point of view. In 2012 and 2016, Bolojan was re-elected mayor, obtaining 66.08%, and 70.95% of the vote, respectively.

=== President of the Bihor County Council (2020–2024) ===
In 2020, Bolojan was elected president of the Bihor County Council with 61.51% of the vote. He continued to promote infrastructural development and investment attraction projects for the county, improving public services and creating a more efficient and transparent administrative system.

=== President of the Senate (2024–2025) ===
Following the December 2024 parliamentary elections, Bolojan became a member of the Romanian Senate, and on 23 December 2024, he was chosen as the president of the Senate of Romania.

=== Acting presidency (February–May 2025) ===
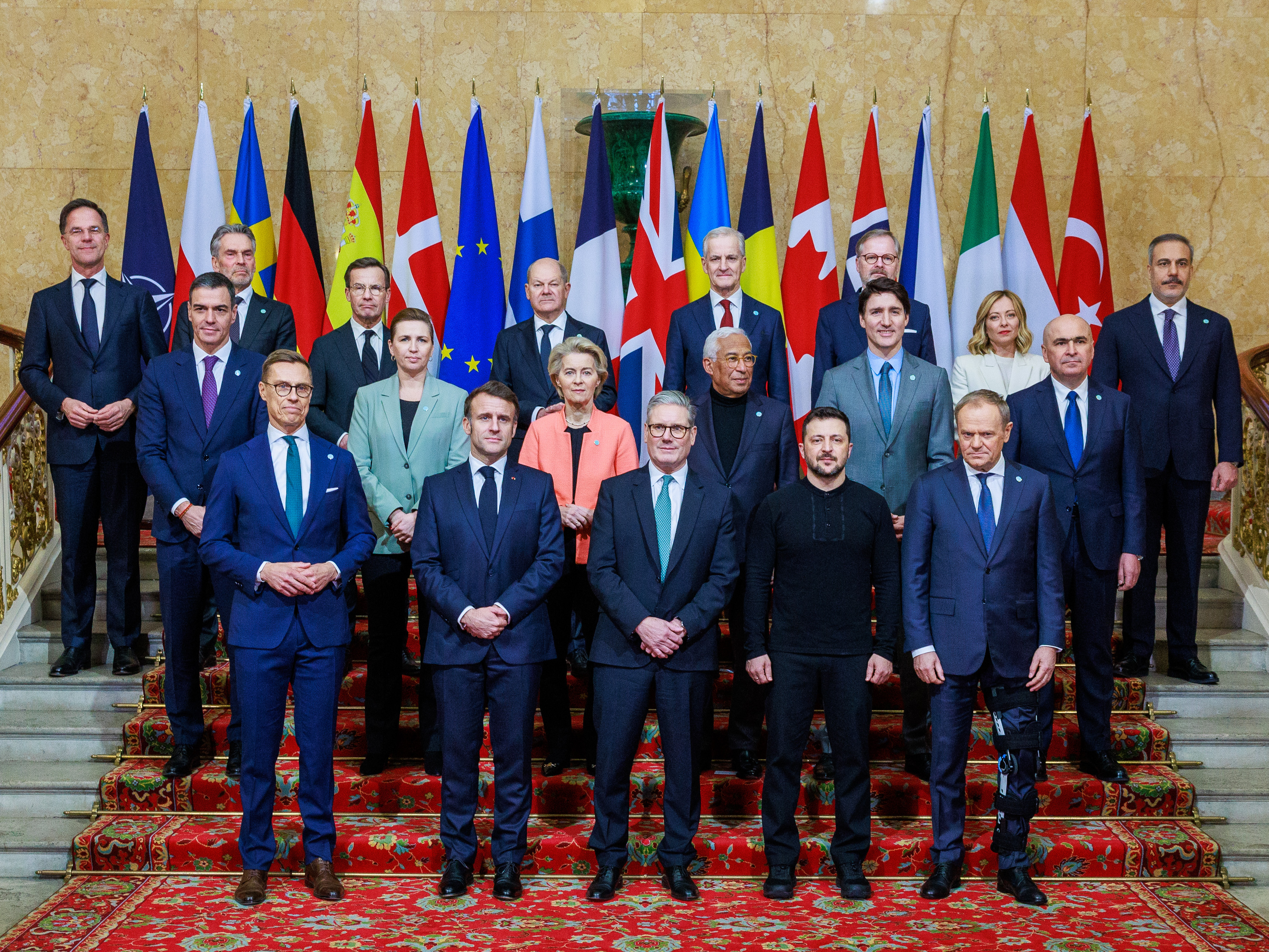
Bolojan (far right) at the 2025 London Summit on Ukraine

Following the resignation of Klaus Iohannis on 12 February 2025, Bolojan became acting president in accordance with the presidential succession laws. During the handover ceremony, Iohannis greeted Bolojan at the Cotroceni Palace and held a brief meeting with him. He served as acting president until 26 May 2025, when Nicușor Dan's presidency began following his victory in the 2025 Romanian presidential election.

During his tenure, the presidency of Romania saw a boost in reputation after the lackluster final years of the Iohannis presidency, with more public appearances and media visibility. In foreign affairs, Bolojan reiterated Romania's commitment to helping Ukraine during the Russian invasion of Ukraine with logistics and additional deliveries, ensured stronger ties with southern neighbor Bulgaria and had a major meeting with Emmanuel Macron regarding French military presence on NATO's Eastern flank, though opposing the presence of additional nuclear weapons.

Domestically, he was seen as a stabilizing force following the social and institutional crisis caused by the annulment of the Presidential elections months prior. He promised a more organized and better regulated presidential election and reiterated the obligation of national institutions to respect and serve the Romanian people. Bolojan met with local banking associations to discuss and implement plans regarding EU funds absorption and investments in local businesses and infrastructure. He also militated for an increase in defense spending in the context of the Russo-Ukrainian War, saying "“defence is no longer a free service". His interim presidency came to an end on 26 May 2025 following Nicusor Dan's win in the presidential elections. After nearly a month of negotiations, he assumed the premiership after being named by Dan.

=== Premiership (2025–2026) ===
On 16 June, President Dan hinted that he would appoint Bolojan prime minister later that week, with the coalition deal with the PSD being confirmed the following day. Under the agreement, Bolojan would be appointed prime minister but would have to leave office for a PSD member in 2027. He was formally nominated on 20 June, and confirmed by the Chamber of Deputies in a 301 to 9 vote three days later.

His term began during a period of high distrust in national institutions. The previous two Ciolacu governments left Romania with the highest inflation rate in the EU at the time of the beginning of their term (5.8% in June 2025) and a budget deficit of 9.3% (also the highest in the EU) of total GDP due to excessive increase in spending; Marcel Ciolacu had previously ignored warnings from his Finance Minister, Marcel Bolos, about the deficit and inflation.

Bolojan collaborated with the ministers of his cabinet in order to tackle these two issues primarily by adopting a number of unpopular economic measures, split into multiple packages. In the first package, the VAT was increased from 19% to 21%, marking the first hike since 2016. Additionally, the government consolidated its reduced VAT rates of 5% and 9% into a single reduced rate of 11%, applicable to a broad range of goods and services. These tax increases were met with challenges: public protests and some limited threats of strikes and a no-confidence vote. Eventually, the measures passed successfully.

The second wave of measures targeted the public sector: the government sought to downsize the administrative apparatus of multiple institutions which were the subject of unmotivated increases in personnel in the years prior, resulting in higher spending. The numbers of employees were reduced and remuneration capping were also targets of the measures. A pressing issue that has been present in Romanian society for a considerable number of years is that of judicial pension reform. Currently, magistrates and judges in Romania can retire much earlier than many other employees and also benefit from a much higher pension than the average. This was a significant measure that the prime minister sought to implement. Still, it was shot down by Romania's supreme court on 20 October 2025.

Initially, Bolojan's premiership was met with public enthusiasm; however, the implementation of strict fiscal measures has elicited criticism from broader society. Among his peers, he is regarded as a serious, disciplined, and calculated politician. His governing ability is constrained by the compromises required to maintain the coalition government he leads. In early January 2026, Bolojan described the U.S. military intervention in Venezuela as a "special operation" that was "not usual". He stated that Romania would align with the EU's position and expressed hope for a democratic transition in Venezuela.

==== 2026 political crisis ====
On 20 April 2026, the Social Democratic Party left Bolojan's coalition government and a week later joined the Alliance for the Union of Romanians to call a vote of no confidence in the government. The vote on 5 May concluded at 281 for his removal and four against. Bolojan remained as carakter prime minister until 20 October, becoming the longest-serving ad interim head of government in Romania's history, surpassing the previous record of 71 days set by Emil Boc of the Democratic Liberal Party (PDL) in 2009.

The United States may have influenced this vote, according to some political scientists. According to reports in The Wall Street Journal, US Ambassador to Greece Kimberly Guilfoyle allegedly boasted that she had brought down the Romanian government. The dispute between the United States and the Romanian government concerned the purchase of American liquefied natural gas (LNG), which was being sold at a price above market rates.

== See also ==
- List of current heads of state and government
- List of heads of the executive by approval rating

== Notes ==
Party political offices
Preceded by Nicolae Ciucă	President of the National Liberal Party; Acting; 2024–2025	Succeeded by Catalin Predoiu; Acting
Political offices
Preceded by Nicolae Ciucă	President of the Senate of Romania; 2024–2025	Succeeded by Mircea Abrudean
Preceded by Klaus Iohannis	President of Romania; Acting; 2025	Succeeded by Nicușor Dan
Preceded by Cătălin Predoiu; Acting	Prime Minister of Romania; 2025–2026	Succeeded by Luca Niculescu
