= Cătălin Predoiu =

Romanian politician (born 1968)

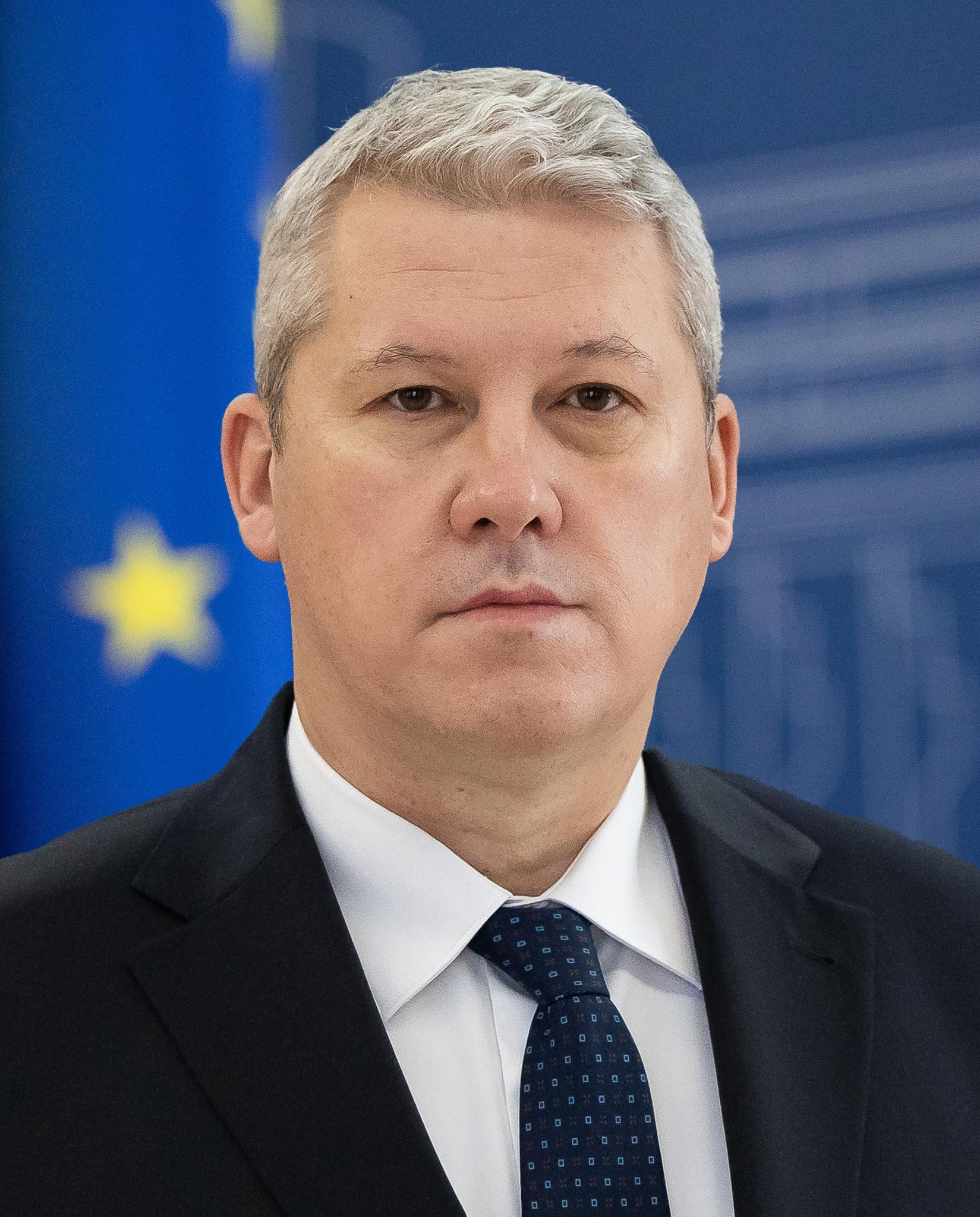
- Predoiu in 2025

Prime Minister of Romania
- Acting
- In office 6 May 2025 – 23 June 2025
- President: Ilie Bolojan (acting); Nicușor Dan
- Deputy: Marian Neacșu; Barna Tánczos
- Preceded by: Marcel Ciolacu
- Succeeded by: Ilie Bolojan
- In office 12 June 2023 – 15 June 2023
- President: Klaus Iohannis
- Deputy: Sorin Grindeanu; Hunor Kelemen
- Preceded by: Nicolae Ciucă
- Succeeded by: Marcel Ciolacu
- In office 6 February 2012 – 9 February 2012
- President: Traian Băsescu
- Deputy: Béla Markó
- Preceded by: Emil Boc
- Succeeded by: Mihai Răzvan Ungureanu
Ministerial offices held
Deputy Prime Minister of Romania
In office 15 June 2023 – 20 October 2026
Prime Minister	Marcel Ciolacu; Himself (acting); Ilie Bolojan
Preceded by	Sorin Grindeanu; Hunor Kelemen
Succeeded by	Marian Neacșu
Minister of Internal Affairs
In office 15 June 2023 – 20 October 2026
Prime Minister	Marcel Ciolacu; Himself (acting); Ilie Bolojan
Preceded by	Lucian Bode
Succeeded by	Marian Neacșu
Minister of Justice
In office 25 November 2021 – 15 June 2023
Prime Minister	Nicolae Ciucă; Himself
Preceded by	Lucian Bode (acting)
Succeeded by	Alina Gorghiu
In office 4 November 2019 – 23 December 2020
Prime Minister	Ludovic Orban
Preceded by	Ana Birchall
Succeeded by	Stelian Ion
In office 29 February 2008 – 7 May 2012
Prime Minister	Călin Popescu-Tăriceanu; Emil Boc; Himself (acting); Mihai Răzvan Ungureanu
Preceded by	Teodor Meleșcanu (acting)
Succeeded by	Titus Corlăţean
Minister of Foreign Affairs
In office 1 October 2009 – 23 December 2009
Prime Minister	Emil Boc
Preceded by	Cristian Diaconescu
Succeeded by	Teodor Baconschi
Other offices held
President of the National Liberal Party
Acting
In office 12 February 2025 – 26 May 2025
Preceded by	Ilie Bolojan (acting)
Succeeded by	Ilie Bolojan (acting)
Senator of Romania
Incumbent
Assumed office 20 December 2024
Constituency	Prahova County
Member of the Chamber of Deputies
In office 21 December 2016 – 20 December 2024
Constituency	Călărași County; Prahova County

Personal details
- Born: Cătălin Marian Predoiu; 27 August 1968 (age 58) Buzău, Romania
- Party: PNL (2014–present)
- Other political affiliations: PNL-AT (1991–1993); PDL (2013–2014)
- Education: University of Bucharest
- Profession: Lawyer

Cătălin Marian Predoiu (Note: Romanian pronunciation: [kətəˈlin mariˈan preˈdoju]) (born 27 August 1968) is a Romanian politician and lawyer who served as the interim prime minister of Romania from 6 May 2025 to 23 June 2025, following the resignation of Marcel Ciolacu; from 12 June to 15 June 2023, following the resignation of Nicolae Ciucă; and from 6 February to 9 February 2012, following the resignation of Emil Boc.

He had previously been the Minister of Justice three times from 2008 to 2012, 2019 to 2020, and from 2021 to 2023.

== Early life and education ==
Cătălin Predoiu graduated from the Faculty of Law at the University of Bucharest in 1991. In 1994 he completed a training program in commercial law at the Caen Bar in France. Since 2003 he is a member of the Council of Bucharest Bar Association.

Between 1994 and 2005 he taught commercial law as a lecturer at University of Bucharest. Predoiu published several articles and studies about commercial law and has received a prize from the Romanian Academy as a co-author of a law treatise. He completed his Ph.D. degree in commercial banks in 2004.

Predoiu was an associate lawyer at the Zamfirescu, Racoți, Predoiu (ZRP) law partnership until 2008 working as a commercial and corporate governance lawyer. His law firm assisted Rompetrol, the company owned by fellow Liberal Dinu Patriciu, as well as the American company Cross Lander during the controversial privatization and bankruptcy of ARO SUV producer.

Predoiu was a member of the board of directors of the state-owned CEC Bank until March 2008, when he resigned due to incompatibility of office.

== Political career ==
Predoiu became a member in 1991 of the National Liberal Party - Young Wing (PNL-AT; a splinter from the National Liberal Party led by Dinu Patriciu and Călin Popescu-Tăriceanu), however this party was soon disbanded in 1993.

On February 29, 2008, in a move that surprised even other leaders of National Liberal Party, Prime-Minister Călin Popescu-Tăriceanu proposed him as Minister of Justice, his candidature being approved by President Traian Băsescu.

He was a candidate from PNL for the Chamber of Deputies in Buzău, however, he got only 28.9% of the votes, losing to Social Democrat Marian Ghiveciu, who got 46.6%. His term as Minister of Justice was extended in the new Emil Boc Cabinet (since 22 December 2008), composed of Social Democratic Party (PSD) and Democratic Liberal Party (PDL) members. This brought criticism from his party, the National Liberal Party (PNL), which led to Predoiu's self-suspension from it. He argued that he accepted this new nomination only to continue his work at the ministry. He was the only independent minister in the first Boc Cabinet.

In the second Boc cabinet, he was one of three independent ministers of that government (together with Mihail Dumitru and Teodor Baconschi) and the only member of the Tăriceanu cabinet still in office.

In December 2009, he was reappointed Minister of Justice, and became the only independent minister, after Dumitru was replaced and Baconschi became a member of PDL. He was replaced in his position on 8 May 2012.

In October 2011, the Ministry of Justice signed a 1.5 million lei contract with RVA Insolvency, a company to which Predoiu's father-in-law was an associate. According to the Ministry, the conflict of interest laws did not apply in this case because the contract was financed by the World Bank, not the government budget.

In 2013, Predoiu became a member of the PDL, being named the First Vice President and Shadow Prime Minister of the party. Following the alliance of PDL and PNL, National Liberal presidential candidate Klaus Iohannis expressed his support for Predoiu as prime-minister.

In 2014, following the merger between PDL and PNL, he became First Vice President of PNL until an unification Congress in the summer of 2017. In the Romanian legislative election of 2016, Predoiu won a seat in the Chamber of Deputies in Călărași on PNL's party list. In November 2019, after the ousting of Viorica Dăncilă's government in a no-confidence motion, Predoiu was reappointed Minister of Justice in the cabinet led by PNL leader Ludovic Orban. He served a 1-year term until Orban's resignation after the loss of the 2020 legislative elections and the appointment of Florin Cîțu to make a coalition government with the USR-PLUS and UDMR.

On 25 November 2021 he was reappointed Minister of Justice again, in the incumbent Ciucă Cabinet.

On 15 June 2023, he was appointed Minister of Internal Affairs in the Ciolacu cabinet. He maintained his position following the reshuffle after the 2024 Romanian parliamentary election.

On 6 May 2025, he was appointed by the interim President Ilie Bolojan to serve as interim Prime Minister until a new cabinet is sworn in following the resignation of Marcel Ciolacu in the aftermath of the 2025 Romanian presidential election.

== Electoral history ==
=== Mayor of Bucharest ===
Election	Affiliation	First round			Second round		
Election	Affiliation	Votes	Percentage	Position	Votes	Percentage	Position
2016	PNL	64,186	11.18%	3rd			

Political offices
Preceded by Emil Boc	Prime Minister of Romania; Acting; 2012	Succeeded by Mihai Răzvan Ungureanu
Preceded by Nicolae Ciucă	Prime Minister of Romania; Acting; 2023	Succeeded by Marcel Ciolacu
Preceded by Marcel Ciolacu	Prime Minister of Romania; Acting; 2025	Succeeded by Ilie Bolojan
