= Luca Niculescu =

Prime Minister of Romania since 2026

- Niculescu in 2026

Prime Minister of Romania
- Incumbent
- Assumed office 20 October 2026
- President: Nicușor Dan
- Deputy: Marian Neacșu
- Preceded by: Ilie Bolojan

Secretary of State in the Ministry of Foreign Affairs and National Coordinator for the Accession Process of Romania to the Organisation for Economic Co-operation and Development (OECD)
- In office 1 September 2022 – 20 October 2026
- Preceded by: Office established
- Succeeded by: TBD
Ambassador positions
Ambassador of Romania to Monaco
In office 21 April 2016 – 11 July 2022
Preceded by	Bogdan Mazuru
Succeeded by	Ioana Bivolaru
Ambassador of Romania to Andorra
In office 14 April 2016 – 11 July 2022
Preceded by	Bogdan Mazuru
Succeeded by	Ioana Bivolaru
Ambassador of Romania to France
In office 9 January 2016 – 11 July 2022
Preceded by	Bogdan Mazuru
Succeeded by	Ioana Bivolaru

Personal details
- Born: 25 April 1971 (age 55) Bucharest, Romania
- Education: University of Bucharest; University of Strasbourg
- Occupation: Journalist; diplomat

Luca Alexandru Niculescu (Note: Romanian pronunciation: [ˈluka alekˈsandru nikuˈlesku]) (born 25 April 1971) is a Romanian journalist and diplomat who has been serving as the Prime Minister of Romania since 20 October 2026. He previously worked as a journalist in Romanian and French media outlets for several years. Niculescu was the ambassador of Romania to France, Andorra and Monaco from 2016 to 2022. From 2022 to 2026, he served as secretary of state of the Ministry of Foreign Affairs of Romania for the country's accession to the Organisation for Economic Co-operation and Development (OECD). On 5 October 2026, he was designated as Prime Minister by President Nicușor Dan and was sworn in on 20 October 2026.

== Biography ==
Luca Niculescu was born on 25 April 1971 in Bucharest, Romania. He graduated from the Faculty of Journalism and Communication Studies of the University of Bucharest in 1995. In 1996, Niculescu obtained a master's degree in European Journalism from the University Center for Journalism Education of the University of Strasbourg in Strasbourg, France.

Niculescu afterwards became a journalist, building a career focused on the field of international relations. He became a journalist for Radio France Internationale (RFI) in 1992 and the editor-in-chief of RFI România, the Romanian-language service of RFI, in 2000. From 2006, he directed the program Afaceri externe ("Foreign Affairs") on the TV channel The Money Channel. Between 2007 and 2012, he moderated several programs on the Romanian public channel TVR 1, namely Arena publică ("Public Arena"), Europa ne privește ("Europe is Watching Us") and Fără frontiere ("Without Borders"). From 2012, Niculescu moderated the programs Imparțial ("Impartial") and Pașaport diplomatic ("Diplomatic Passport") at Digi24. He has also been a permanent correspondent in Romania for multiple French media outlets, such as France Culture, France Info, France Inter, Libération and TV5Monde. Romanian newspaper Adevărul described Niculescu as a "convinced Francophone". Niculescu was the journalist who conducted the first televised interview with Dacian Cioloș, then Prime Minister of Romania, after his cabinet received the vote of confidence from the Parliament.

In 2016, Niculescu became the Romanian ambassador to France, Andorra and Monaco, being accredited by then President of Romania, Klaus Iohannis, as ambassador to France on 9 January, to Andorra on 14 April and to Monaco on 21 April. On 13 February 2019, Niculescu was elected president of the Group of Francophone Ambassadors of France (GAFF), which brings together over 40 ambassadors to France from member, associate and observer states of the Organisation internationale de la Francophonie (OIF), which Romania joined as a full member in 1993. He was recalled from his ambassador post on 11 July 2022. On 1 September 2022, Niculescu was appointed secretary of state of the Ministry of Foreign Affairs of Romania for the country's accession process to the Organisation for Economic Co-operation and Development (OECD).

As of early June 2026, Niculescu and diplomat Mihnea Motoc were being considered as potential Minister of Foreign Affairs in a government to be led by Eugen Tomac as prime minister. However, on 14 June, Tomac withdrew from consideration, having failed to win enough support to form a technocratic government after he was nominated as prime minister.

== Awards and distinctions ==
Niculescu is the recipient of multiple awards, such as the Medal for Loyalty from the Royal House of Romania in 2012; the Order of Arts and Letters in the rank of "Commander", granted by the Minister of Culture of France in 2019; the Cross of the Royal House of Romania, conferred by Margareta, Custodian of the Romanian Crown, in 2022; and the Legion of Honour in the rank of "Commander", given by the President of France in 2023. He was also awarded the Francophone Personality of the Year award in 2003, the Award of the Association of Television Professionals of Romania for the best talk show in 2008 and 2011 for his program Fără frontiere, the European Journalist of the Year award from the European Institute of Romania in 2010 and the Order of Cultural Merit in the rank of "Knight", given by the Romanian president to RFI România in 2015.
