= Second Tăriceanu cabinet =

Tăriceanu II
- 117th Cabinet of Romania

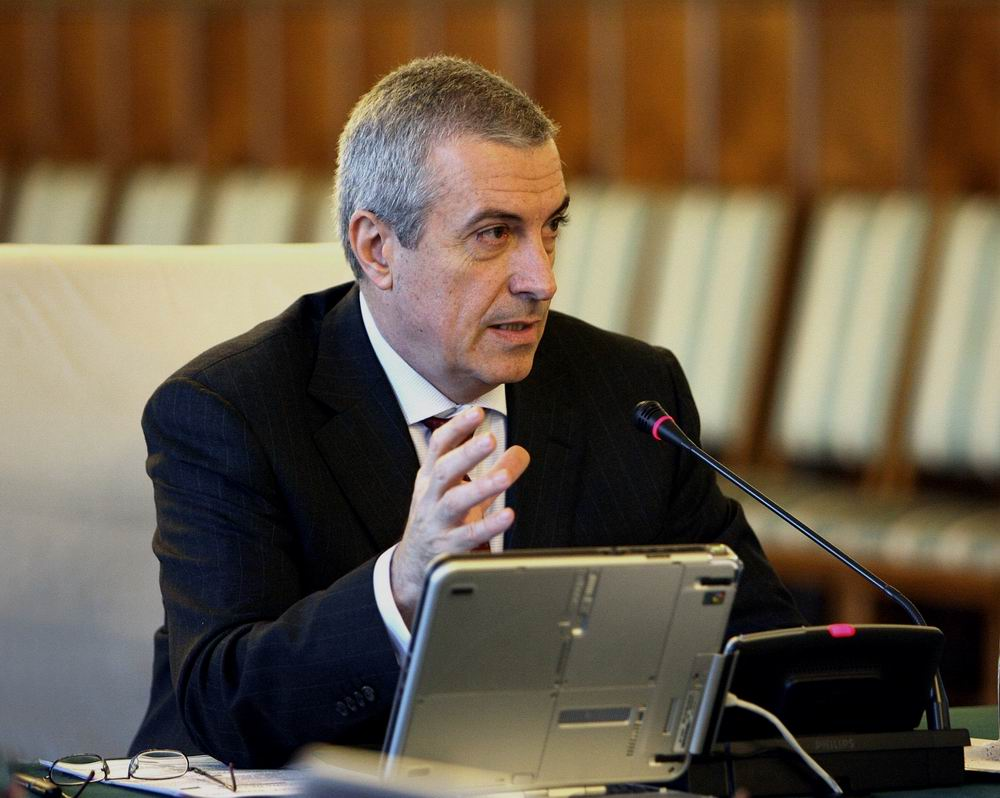
- Date formed: 5 April 2007
- Date dissolved: 22 December 2008

People and organisations
- Head of state: Traian Băsescu
- Head of government: Călin Popescu-Tăriceanu
- Ministers removed: 6
- Total no. of members: 19
- Member party: PNL, UDMR
- Status in legislature: Coalition (Minority)
- Opposition party: PSD, PD/PDL, PC, PRM
- Opposition leader: Mircea Geoană, Corneliu Vadim Tudor

History
- Election: 28 November 2004
- Outgoing election: 30 November 2008
- Legislature term: 2004–2008
- Budget: One
- Predecessor: Tăriceanu I
- Successor: Boc I

The second Tăriceanu cabinet of the government of Romania was composed of 18 ministers, listed below. It was sworn in on 5 April 2007, and experienced some ministerial changes, particularly in the final months of its term. It was a coalition government, formed by the PNL and the UDMR. Its term ended on 22 December 2008, when the new cabinet, headed by Emil Boc, received the vote of confidence from the Parliament and was sworn in at Cotroceni Palace.

Prime Minister	Name	Party	Period
Prime Minister	Călin Popescu-Tăriceanu	National Liberal Party	5 April 2007 – 22 December 2008
Minister of State	Name	Party	Period
Co-ordinating Culture, Education, European Integration	Béla Markó	Democratic Alliance of Hungarians in Romania	5 April 2007 – 3 Jul 2007
Minister	Name	Party	Period
Justice	Tudor Chiuariu	National Liberal Party	5 April 2007 – 15 Jan 2008
Justice	Teodor Meleșcanu (ad interim)	National Liberal Party	15 Jan 2008 – 29 Feb 2008
Justice	Cătălin Predoiu	National Liberal Party	29 Feb 2008 – 22 December 2008
Defense	Teodor Meleșcanu	National Liberal Party	5 April 2007 – 22 December 2008
Ministry of Culture and National Identity	Adrian Iorgulescu	National Liberal Party	5 April 2007 – 22 December 2008
Agriculture, and Rural Development	Decebal Traian Remeș	National Liberal Party	5 April 2007 – Aug. 2007
Agriculture, and Rural Development	Dacian Cioloș	National Liberal Party	5 August 2007 – 22 December 2008
Public Health	Eugen Nicolăescu	National Liberal Party	5 April 2007 – 22 December 2008
Foreign Affairs	Adrian Cioroianu	National Liberal Party	5 Apr 2007 – 15 Apr 2008
Foreign Affairs	Lazăr Comănescu	National Liberal Party	15 Apr 2008 – 22 December 2008
Economy and Finance	Varujan Vosganian	National Liberal Party	5 April 2007 – 22 December 2008
Labor, Family, and Social Solidarity	Paul Păcuraru	National Liberal Party	5 April 2007 – Sep. 2008
Labor, Family, and Social Solidarity	Eugen Nicolăescu (ad interim)	National Liberal Party	Sep. 2008 – 25 Sep 2008
Labor, Family, and Social Solidarity	Mariana Câmpeanu	National Liberal Party	25 Sep 2008 – 22 December 2008
Environment and Sustainable Development	Attila Korodi	Democratic Alliance of Hungarians in Romania	5 April 2007 – 22 December 2008
Transport	Ludovic Orban	National Liberal Party	5 April 2007 – 22 December 2008
Interior and Administrative Reform	Cristian David	National Liberal Party	5 April 2007 – 22 December 2008
Development, Public Works and Dwellings	László Borbély	Democratic Alliance of Hungarians in Romania	5 April 2007 – 22 December 2008
Education, Research and Youth	Cristian Adomniței	National Liberal Party	5 Apr 2007 – 8 Oct 2008
Education, Research and Youth	Anton Anton	National Liberal Party	8 Oct 2008 – 22 December 2008
Communications and Information Technology	Zsolt Nagy	Democratic Alliance of Hungarians in Romania	5 April 2007 – 11 Jun 2007
Communications and Information Technology	Iuliu Winkler	Democratic Alliance of Hungarians in Romania	11 Jun 2007 – Nov. 2007
Communications and Information Technology	Károly Borbély	Democratic Alliance of Hungarians in Romania	Nov. 2007 – 22 December 2008
Small and Medium Enterprises, Commerce, Tourism, and Liberal Occupations	Ovidiu Ioan Silaghi	National Liberal Party	5 April 2007 – 22 December 2008
Minister Delegate	Name	Party	Period
Relations with Parliament	Mihai Voicu	National Liberal Party	5 April 2007 – 22 December 2008
