= List of Romanian governments =

This is a list of the successive governments of Romania.

== Current structure and incumbents ==
Ministry and Cabinet office	Incumbent	Since	Until	Party
Prime Minister	Luca Niculescu	20 October 2026	Present	Independent
Deputy Prime minister	Marian Neacșu	20 October 2026	Present	PSD
Ministry of Finance	Alexandru Nazare	20 October 2026	Present	Independent
Ministry of Internal Affairs	Marian Neacșu	20 October 2026	Present	PSD
Ministry of Foreign Affairs	Dan Neculăescu	20 October 2026	Present	Independent
Ministry of Justice	Radu Marinescu	20 October 2026	Present	PSD
Ministry of National Defence	Ștefan-Radu Oprea	20 October 2026	Present	PSD
Ministry of Economy, Digitalisation, Entrepreneurship, and Tourism	Daniel-Cătălin Zamfir	20 October 2026	Present	PSD
Ministry of Energy	Dumitru Chisăliță	20 October 2026	Present	Independent
Ministry of Transport and Infrastructure	Ștefan-Ovidiu Popa	20 October 2026	Present	PSD
Ministry of Agriculture and Rural Development	Florin-Ionuț Barbu	20 October 2026	Present	PSD
Ministry of Environment, Water and Forests	Natalia-Elena Intotero	20 October 2026	Present	PSD
Ministry of Development, Public Works and Administration	Alexandru Stoica	20 October 2026	Present	PSD
Ministry of Investments and European Projects	Mihai Ghigiu	20 October 2026	Present	PSD
Ministry of Labour and Social Solidarity	Florin Manole	20 October 2026	Present	PSD
Ministry of Health	Alexandru Rogobete	20 October 2026	Present	PSD
Ministry of Education	Sorin Costreie	20 October 2026	Present	Independent
Ministry of Culture	Ioana Ciocan	20 October 2026	Present	Independent
Delegated Ministers
Minister delegate for Pre-university Education	Sorin Ionescu	20 October 2026	Present	PSD
Minister delegate of Digitalisation and Artificial Intelligence	Bogdan Dumitru	20 October 2026	Present	Independent

== History ==
=== First Petre Roman cabinet ===
The first Roman Cabinet was led by Petre Roman between December 1989 – June 28, 1990.

=== Second Petre Roman cabinet ===
The second Roman Cabinet was led by Petre Roman between June 28, 1990 – April 30, 1991.

=== Third Petre Roman cabinet ===
The third Roman Cabinet was led by Petre Roman between April 30, 1991 – October 16, 1991.

=== Theodor Sotolojan cabinet ===
The Stolojan I Cabinet was the Cabinet of the Government of Romania between October 16, 1991, and 1992. It was the fourth Cabinet after the fall of Communism in Romania. The Prime Minister was Theodor Stolojan, former communist official (responsible with the foreign currency), and FSN member at the time he took office.

=== Nicolae Văcăroiu cabinet ===
The Văcăroiu I Cabinet was led by Nicolae Văcăroiu from 1992 to 1996.

=== Victor Ciorbea cabinet ===
The Ciorbea I Cabinet was led by Victor Ciorbea from 1996 to 1998.

=== Radu Vasile cabinet ===
The Vasile I Cabinet was led by Radu Vasile from 1998 to 1999.

=== Mugur Isărescu cabinet ===
The Isărescu I Cabinet was led by Mugur Isărescu from 1999 to 2000.

=== Adrian Năstase cabinet ===
The Năstase I Cabinet was led by Adrian Năstase from 2000 – 29 December 2004.

=== First Călin Popescu-Tăriceanu cabinet ===
The first Tăriceanu Cabinet was the cabinet of the government of Romania led by Călin Popescu-Tăriceanu between December 29, 2004, and April 5, 2007. It succeeded Năstase I Cabinet, and was succeeded by the Tăriceanu II Cabinet.

It was a multiple-party coalition, formed by National Liberal Party (PNL), Democratic Party (PD), Democratic Union of Hungarians in Romania (UDMR), and Romanian Humanist Party/Conservative Party (PUR/PC). It consisted of three Ministers of State (one for each party of the coalition, except for the National Liberal Party, which held the Prime Minister position), 15 Ministers, and six Ministers Delegate. In the early 2007, the Conservative Party withdrew from the coalition. As a result, the Conservative Party's Minister Delegate post was dissolved, and the other Conservative Party's posts were re-shuffled between the National Liberal Party and the Democratic Party.

=== Second Călin Popescu-Tăriceanu cabinet ===
The second Tăriceanu Cabinet of the Government of Romania was composed of 18 ministers, listed below. It was sworn in on April 5, 2007, and has since reshuffled numerous ministers, including in the last two months of term. It was a coalition Government, formed by the PNL, and the UDMR. Its term ended on 22 December 2008, when the new cabinet, headed by Emil Boc received the vote of confidence from the Parliament and was sworn in at Cotroceni Palace.

=== First Emil Boc cabinet ===
The first Boc Cabinet of the Government of Romania was composed of 20 ministers, listed below. It was sworn in on 22 December 2008, the same day it received the vote of confidence from the Parliament of Romania. It was a grand coalition government, formed by the PD-L and the PSD. The Cabinet could have faced a Constitutional issue, by using the term "Deputy Prime Minister", instead of the one used in the previous cabinets "Minister of State".

Following the resignation of Liviu Dragnea (PSD) from the office of Minister of Administration and Interior, on February 2, 2009, the Parliament voted to unify the post of Deputy Prime Minister with the post of Minister of Administration and Interior.

On October 1, 2009, following the removal from office of the Deputy Prime Minister, Minister of Administration and Interior, Dan Nica (PSD), all the PSD Ministers resigned from the cabinet. As a result, all their offices were taken, ad interim by the PD-L, for a period no longer than 45 days. The cabinet should have received a new vote from the Parliament, as its political composition was changed. On 13 October 2009 the Parliament voted for a motion of no confidence. As a result, this Cabinet was just an acting Cabinet. Its term ended on 23 December 2009, when the new cabinet, headed also by Emil Boc received the vote of confidence from the Parliament and was sworn in at Cotroceni Palace. During the interim period, Traian Băsescu nominated repeatedly friendly candidates, despite the fact that the then opposition parties (PNL, PSD, UDMR, and the 18 representatives of the national ethnic minorities), having an absolute majority in both Houses of Parliament, expressed their will to nominate the Mayor of Sibiu Klaus Iohannis as Prime Minister.
