= Shale gas by country =

Shale gas is an unconventional natural gas produced from shale, a type of sedimentary rock. Shale gas has become an increasingly important source of natural gas in the United States over the past decade, and interest has spread to potential gas shales in Canada, Europe, Asia, and Australia. One analyst expects shale gas to supply as much as half the natural gas production in North America by 2020.

In a 2013 report, the US Energy Information Administration estimated the quantity of technically recoverable shale gas for 41 countries. North America leads the worldwide production of shale gas, with the US and Canada having significant levels. Beyond the US and Canada, shale gas is so far produced at a commercial scale only in Argentina and China. While the shale gas potential of many nations seems promising, there are several obstacles spanning several economic, environmental, technical and social issues grouped in major categories such as access to resources, infrastructure and governance.

Shale gas production has been blocked in many countries largely because of the environmental risks involved. These risks and social concerns have resulted in legal restrictions on hydraulic fracturing, that have prevented a more extensive development of shale gas worldwide.

== Africa ==
=== South Africa ===
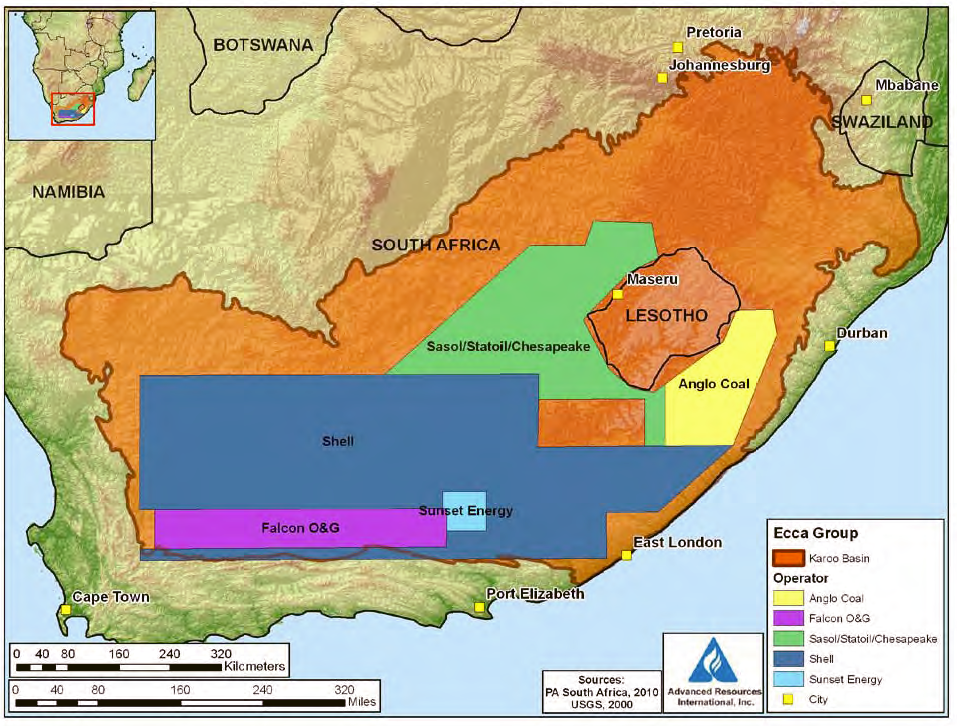
Map Showing Operator Permits in the Karoo Basin, South Africa

South Africa has a major sedimentary basin that contains thick organic-rich shales: the Karoo Basin in central and southern South Africa. The Karoo Basin is large, extending across nearly two-thirds of the country, with the southern portion of the basin potentially favorable for shale gas. However, the basin contains significant areas of igneous sill intrusions that may impact the quality of the shale gas resources, limit the use of seismic imaging, and increase the risks of shale gas exploration. The Karoo is estimated to have technically recoverable resource of 485 trillion cubic feet (Tcf) of gas.

Several companies intend to explore for shale gas using hydraulic fracturing in the Karoo region. This is bitterly opposed by a coalition of environmentalists, farmers and local residents.

Falcon Oil & Gas Ltd. was an early entrant into the shale gas play of South Africa, obtaining an 11,600-mi2 (30,000-km2) Technical Cooperation Permit (TCP) along the southern edge of the Karoo Basin. Shell obtained a larger 71,400-mi2 (185,000-km2) TCP surrounding the Falcon area, while Sunset Energy holds a 1,780 mi2 (4,600-km2) TCP to the west of Falcon. The Sasol/Chesapeake/Statoil JV TCP area of 34,000-mi2 (88,000-km2) and the Anglo Coal TCP application area of 19,300 mi2 (50,000-km2) is to the north and east of Shell's TPC.

== Americas ==
=== Argentina ===
In June 2013, the US Energy Information Administration estimated that Argentina held 802 trillion cubic feet of recoverable shale gas reserves, the third largest in the world. Large reserves of tight oil and gas were in the Vaca Muerta formation. In 2014, three-quarters of the shale gas and oil concessions in the country were held by the Argentinian company YPF (nationalised in 2012) which committed to develop the Vaca Muerta field with US company Chevron Corporation. However, in spite of a hydrocarbons law favourable to exploring and developing companies and passed by the Argentine Senate in 2014, the Financial Times noted that "Some analysts doubt whether many companies will follow Chevron until Argentine's erratic president Cristina Fernandez, leaves power in 2015."

=== Canada ===
Recent shale gas discoveries have caused a sharp increase in estimated recoverable natural gas in Canada. The nation has a number of prospective shale gas targets in various stages of exploration and exploitation in British Columbia, Alberta, Saskatchewan, Ontario, Quebec, New Brunswick and Nova Scotia.

One major area of exploration in Canada is north of Fort Nelson, in north east British Columbia. Encana and EOG Resources are developing the area known as Horn River due to its high yield shale deposits. A number of these well sites are serviced by Alberta fracturing companies, many of which started out as a one-person operation with the purchase of a cement truck.

This rapid expansion of shale gas in Canada is not without controversy. On 8 March 2011, the Quebec provincial government effectively declared a temporary moratorium on the use of chemical fracturing during shale gas drilling pending a stricter full environment assessment audit. Acting under recommendations from a provincial environmental assessment board, Quebec Minister of Environment Pierre Arcand stated that "We are committed to making sure that it is done properly or it won't be done at all," The assessment board cites the chief concern of groundwater contamination with respect to the St. Lawrence valley, and recommended the audit in order to fully inform and involve communities and the public of the risks involved in shale gas exploitation in Quebec.

=== Mexico ===
Mexico drilled its first shale gas well in 2011, in the Burgos Basin of northern Mexico, in the equivalent of the Eagle Ford Formation of the US. But as of February 2013, there have been only six productive shale gas and tight oil wells drilled in Mexico (a seventh was abandoned as non-productive), all producing from Eagle Ford equivalent. The national oil company Pemex has limited investment capital, and focuses its effort on what it sees as higher-return conventional oil and gas projects, rather than gas shales or tight oil. The US Energy Information Administration estimates Mexico's recoverable reserves of shale gas to be 681 trillion cubic feet, the fourth largest shale gas reserves in the world.

In Mexico's case, the relevance of shale gas passed from official speeches to energy policy priorities, with two scenarios of production included in the Energy Strategy 2012. With five shale basins preliminarily identified, the business-as-usual scenario in the Strategy encompassed the development of only one shale gas play, with the more favorable scenario adding another play. For each scenario, production would start by 2016 with the output expected amounting to 15% and 29% from the total gas production expected by 2026. By early 2013, the thrill of shale gas started to transform, with less fanfare in the edition of the Strategy that year, recognizing that in spite of the considerable shale gas potential, the path of development chosen would be constrained by Mexico's legal and economic framework, with more favorable opportunities depending on the implementation of more ambitious measures, namely an energy reform that could complement the state-owned oil and gas monopoly of more than 75 years

While this reform was eventually accomplished, other challenges must be surmounted. Mexico's shale oil and gas development close to the US border is hampered by the activities of organized criminal groups that include the theft of pipeline products and the extortion to companies in the extractive industries, along with lack of adequate infrastructure; overall, this has resulted in the low economic competitiveness of Mexico's shales in comparison with those across the border in the United States soil. It remains to be seen if the awaited Mexican energy reform will overcome these drawbacks. Owing to Mexico's weak rule of law and poor success in previous major industry reforms, the legal changes brought about might as well end up worsening the drawbacks in the energy sector and namely in the development of the country's shale resources.

=== United States ===
The first commercial gas well drilled in the US, in 1821 in Fredonia, New York, was a shale gas well producing from the Devonian Fredonia Shale formation. After the Drake Oil Well in 1859, however, shale gas production was overshadowed by much larger volumes produced from conventional gas reservoirs.

In 1996, shale gas wells in the United States produced 0.3×10^{12} cu ft (8.5 km^{3}), 1.6% of US gas production; by 2006, production had more than tripled to 1.1×10^{12} cu ft (31 km^{3}) per year, 5.9% of US gas production. By 2005, there were 14,990 shale gas wells in the US. A record 4,185 shale gas wells were completed in the US in 2007. In 2007, shale gas fields included the No. 2 (Barnett/Newark East) and No. 13 (Antrim) sources of natural gas in the United States in terms of gas volumes produced.

A study by MIT says that natural gas will provide 40% of America's energy needs in the future, from 20% today, thanks in part to the abundant supply of shale gas. With 4% annual production growth expected between 2010 and 2030, shale gas has been "a veritable game changer" for the United States.

Shale gas, especially from the Marcellus Shale, have tested up to 16% ethane content. This low priced feedstock for ethylene synthesis has led to a "frenzy" of new ethylene plants in the US.

== Asia ==
Turkiey

According to data obtained from the US energy information. Turkey has 679 billion cubic meter shale gas reserves, especially in the Southeastern Anatolia and Thrace regions, 651 billion cubic meters can be drilled in the first stage.

=== China ===
China has set its companies a target of producing 30 billion cubic meters a year from shale, equivalent to almost half the country's gas consumption in 2008. Potential gas-bearing shales are said to be widespread in China, although as yet undeveloped. In November 2009, US President Barack Obama agreed to share US gas-shale technology with China, and to promote US investment in Chinese shale-gas development.

China launched a national shale gas research centre in August 2010. Based on existing reports, China may have 30 trillion cubic metres of shale gas reserves. In a 2011 report, the US Energy Information Administration estimated that China had 1,275 trillion cubic feet of recoverable shale gas, the largest reserves of all countries surveyed in that report.

As of April 2012, Shell has already drilled a few wells in Sichuan. Notwithstanding the commercial production status reached in 2013, shale gas output remains marginal and at a preliminary stage in China. There are still many challenges to develop this type of unconventional gas resources on a massive scale. Because of the high population density across China, there are considerable water access limitations which must be taken into consideration in any scenario of rapid large-scale production. Oilfield services are dominated by Chinese companies, while the interaction with international companies experienced in the development of shale gas and supply chain solutions is minimal.

=== India ===
Companies including Reliance Industries Limited (E&P), RNRL, Vikas WSP Limited have expressed interest in exploring in India, which is estimated to hold 500 to 2,000 trillion cubic feet of recoverable shale gas. Reliance Industries paid a reported US$1.7 bn for a 40% share in Atlas Energy's leasehold in the Marcellus shale gas play in the eastern US. A complication to shale gas in India is that the government-issued leases for conventional petroleum exploration do not include unconventional sources such as shale gas. However, this policy now has been changed under the Hydrocarbon exploration and licensing policy, which provides a uniform license for exploration of conventional and unconventional oil and gas resources and includes private participation.

In August 2010, a delegation including the director-general of hydrocarbons and officials of the oil ministry is scheduled to meet in Washington with the US Geological Survey to discuss help in identifying and exploiting shale-gas resources in India. Basins of preliminary interest identified by Indian geologists are the Cambay Basin in Gujarat, the Assam-Arakan basin in northeast India, and the Gondwana Basin in central India.

During US President Obama's visit to India in November 2010, India and US decided to cooperate in the fields of clean-tech and shale gas. "We agreed to deepen our co-operation in pursuit of clean energy technologies, including the creation of a new clean energy research centre here in India, and continuing our joint research into solar, biofuels, shale gas and building efficiency," Obama said.

=== Indonesia ===
According to the Geological Agency of the Ministry of Energy and Mineral Resources, Indonesia has proven shale gas resources of 574.07 trillion cubic feet (tcf) or 16.3 trillion cubic meters distributed as follows: Sumatra Island has 233.05 tcf proven resources, Kalimantan Island has 193.93 tcf resources, Papua Island has 94.04 tcf, Java Island has 47.64 tcf, and Sulawesi Island has 5.41 tcf proven resources. In Sumatra Island, the proven shale gas resources are in the North Sumatra province, Central Sumatra, Ombilin, and South Sumatra. Proven shale gas reserves also found in north-west and also north-east of Java Island. In Kalimantan Island, the proven reserves are in Barito, Kutei, Tarakan, Melawi, and Ketungau. Whereas, in Sulawesi Island, there is only one proven reserve, which is Sengkang. Lastly, in Papua Island, the reserves are found in Akimeugah and Bintuni. As of 2012, shale gas, like coal bed methane (CBM), is not yet being developed in Indonesia. The potential reserve of Indonesia shale gas is greater than either CBM or conventional natural gas, with 453 tcf and 334 tcf, respectively.

The Indonesian government has established new regulations to reduce the cost of development of shale gas to ease the advancement of shale gas and bolster exploration both offshore and onshore. The government hopes that these new regulations will attract international as well as national investments. The vital part of this new regulation is that the government now treats oil and gas as oil and natural gas. The government also acknowledges the fracking technology, which makes shale gas exploration possible.

There are some challenges in shale gas development in Indonesia even though that it has abundant resources of shale gas. First, there is a concern that hydraulic fracturing technology could affect the water system in certain areas. Advance and better technology must be applied if the developer wants to utilize the shale gas. Other challenges such as poor local governance, lack of incentives for investors, and insufficient infrastructure must also be addressed.

=== Pakistan ===
As of 2009, Pakistan stands 19th in the world in terms of total technically recoverable shale gas reserves. Pakistan has about 51 trillion cubic feet (Tcf) of shale gas reserves. Pakistan consumes 100% of natural gas that it produces, so shale gas may be an area of future growth in Pakistan.

The US Energy Information Administration (EIA) has estimated shale gas at 586 Tcf against its 2011 estimates of 52 Tcf for Pakistan. More recent estimates as of November 2015, point to over 10,000 Tcf of Shale gas reserves, of which about 205 Tcf is technically recoverable as reported recently by Pakistan's Minister of Petroleum and Natural Resources, Shahid Khaqan Abbasi. Exploratory drilling continues.

== Europe ==
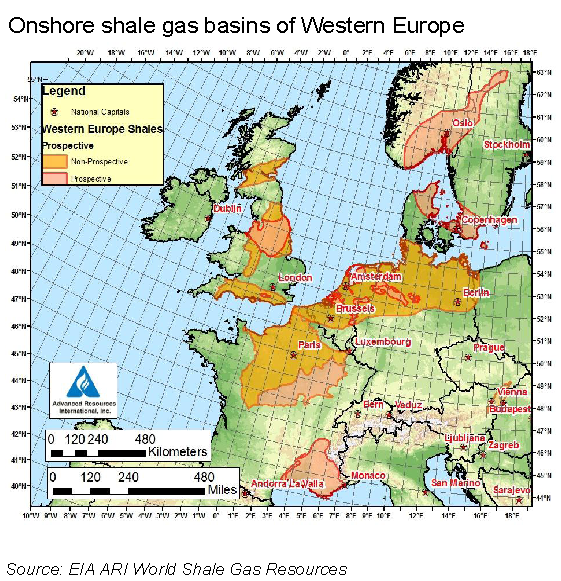
Potential shale gas basins in western Europe (US EIA, 2011)

While Europe has no shale gas production as yet, the success of shale gas in North America has prompted geologists in a number of European countries to examine the productive possibilities of their own organic-rich shales.

Norwegian company Statoil is in a joint venture with Chesapeake Energy to produce Marcellus Formation shale gas in the eastern US, and has indicated interest in bringing knowledge gained in the US to European shale gas prospects. Russian giant Gazprom announced in October 2009 that it may buy a US shale-gas producing company to gain expertise which it could then apply to Russian shale gas prospects. In the Barnett Shale in Texas, French oil firm Total entered a joint venture with Chesapeake Energy, and Italy's ENI purchased an interest in Quicksilver Resources.

A 2012 report from the European Commission states that, unlike the United States, "Shale gas production will not make Europe self-sufficient in natural gas. The best case scenario for shale gas development in Europe is one in which declining conventional production can be replaced and import dependence maintained at a level of around 60%." There is a divergence of opinion among the Weimar Triangle countries with regard to shale gas development. France has introduced a ban, because of the risks connected to the chemicals used in the hydraulic fracturing process, while Germany has suspended operations awaiting further environmental assessments.

In November 2012, a divided European Parliament approved committee reports which recommended that policy on developing shale gas should be set by each member country for itself, rather than by the European Parliament. This was done despite intense lobbying by the Russian gas exporter Gazprom for an EU-wide ban on hydraulic fracturing. As of February 2013, five European countries had bans or moratoriums in place against hydraulic fracturing: France, the Netherlands, Luxembourg, the Czech Republic, and Bulgaria; Romania had recently lifted its moratorium.

The flood of shale gas in North America is credited with lowering the price of natural gas in Europe. Producers of liquified natural gas (LNG), which in 2008 had been preparing to ship their product to the United States, had to find new markets, and so increased their exports to Europe. The increased competition from LNG, as well as the prospect of shale gas development, has given European governments leverage to negotiate price reductions from the Russian gas exporter Gazprom.

European Union Climate Commissioner Connie Hedegaard noted in 2013 that shale gas could be a "game changer" in helping Europe reduce greenhouse gas emissions, as the US has done, by switching from coal to less carbon-intensive natural gas. She cautioned, however, that shale gas would not reduce the need for greater energy efficiency and renewable energy.

=== Austria ===
In 2010 exploration was underway in Austria, where OMV worked on a promising basin near Vienna.

In 2026 OMV announced that it started production with around 11 TWh of gas to be developed in the first phase, and total recoverable resources of up to 48 TWh .

=== Bulgaria ===
Hydraulic fracturing or 'fracking' is prohibited by moratorium despite the 30-million-euro contract signed with Chevron for the exploration of shale gas deposits in Novi Pazar. The exploration plans faced public disaffection that elevated to nationwide protests which led to the decision of the government to ban shale gas exploration in Bulgaria. Study of an additional five sites was planned. The Bulgarian government suspended Chevron's license for shale gas prospecting on 14 January 2012.

=== Denmark ===
The French oil company Total has announced that it will start drilling for shale gas in Denmark in 2013. Total has experience producing shale gas in the US. The Danish affiliate, Total E&P Denmark B.V., and the state-owned oil and gas company Nordsøfonden have been granted two onshore licences for exploration in Northern Jutland and North Zealand. The Danish government has stated, that Denmark should be free of fossil fuels by 2050, and the Danish Energy Agency (Energistyrelsen) has determined that shale gas could be a sustainable link to a green transition in Denmark.

In 2017 Total announced that it had stopped exploring for Shale gas in Denmark,

=== France ===
In 2011, following strong lobbying from Europe Écologie Euro MP José Bové against shale gas exploration in the Larzac area of southern France, the French government suspended three gas exploration permits "until at least this summer". The Environment minister Nathalie Kosciusko-Morizet announced the creation of a commission charged with evaluating the environmental impact of shale gas production, adding "no authorizations for shale gas exploration will be given, or even considered, before the commission reports". The final report was expected in June 2011.

On 20 July 2012, Environment minister Delphine Batho confirmed that the government would maintain a moratorium on shale gas exploration, saying: "nowhere in the world it has been proven that this exploitation can be done without major environmental impact and major health risks". On 14 Sept. 2012, French president François Hollande canceled seven permits for shale gas drilling. He declared "In our current state of knowledge, no one can tell that shale gas and oil extraction by hydraulic fracturing, the only technique known today, is free from serious risks to health and environment."

On 5 November 2012, despite a governmental study 'rapport Gallois' advising continuing study of new extraction methods of shale gas due to the groundwater pollution risks associated with hydraulic fracturing, French president François Hollande refused following pressure from the Green Party.

France derives most of its electricity from nuclear power. As a result, the country often has a surplus of electrical power, which supports use of electric cars.

In December 2017, to fight against global warming, France adopted a law banning new fossil fuel (including shale gas) exploitation projects and closing current ones by 2040 in all of its territories. France thus became the first country to programme the end of fossil fuel exploitation.

=== Germany ===
ExxonMobil holds 750,000 acres (3,000 km^{2}) of leasehold in the Lower Saxony Basin of Germany, where it plans to drill 10 shale-gas wells in 2009.

=== Hungary ===
In 2009, ExxonMobil drilled the first wells for shale gas in the Makó Trough in Hungary.

=== Ireland ===
In February 2011, Enegi Oil was given an option over 495-square kilometers in the Clare Basin, in west of Ireland.

In February 2011, onshore petroleum licences were granted to Tamboran Resources and Lough Allen Natural Gas Company (Langco) in the Northwest Carboniferous Basin of Ireland lasting 24 months covering an area of 1630 km^{2}. Enegi Oil believes that recoverable gas in the option area is between 1.49 TCF and 3.86 TCF."

=== Netherlands ===
Several operators hold a license to explore for shale gas in the Netherlands. In the Netherlands some test wells were planned to be drilled in Boxtel, however it was stopped due to political questions. Up until now there has not been a shale gas well for exploration purposes. The drilling of such a well has been suspended by the Dutch government due to environmental concerns. The Ministry of Economic affairs, Innovation and Agriculture is currently researching the impact of shale gas exploitation, and the results are expected to be published by the end of 2014.

=== Poland ===
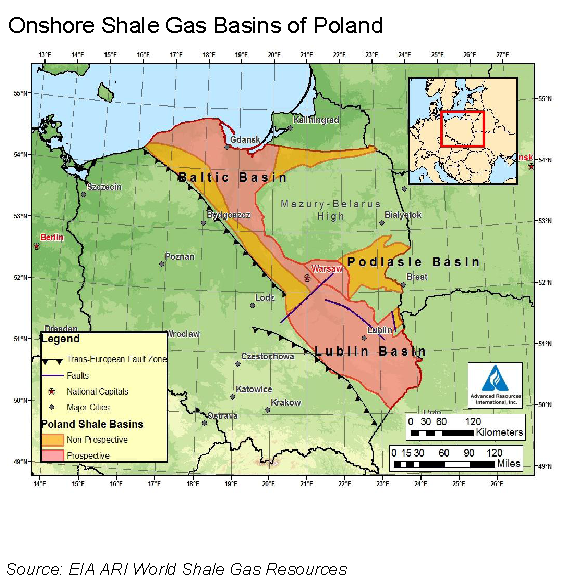
Potential shale gas basins in Poland (US EIA, 2011)

2011 estimates by the US Department of Energy in 2011 pegged out Polish shale reserves as the largest in Europe. The authors of the report calculated that Poland had reserves of about 22.45 trillion cubic meters of shale gas, of which 5.30 trillion cubic meters was recoverable. Most of the shale gas about 3.66 trillion cubic meters is in the Baltic Sea Basin, about 1.25 trillion cubic meters within the region of Lublin province, followed by 0.4 trillion cubic meters in the Podlaskie province. 2012 estimates by the Polish Geological Institute put recoverable reserves at only around 350–750 billion cubic meters, and a 2012 assessment by the U.S. Geological Survey estimated 38.09 billion cubic meters of recoverable gas. The reduced estimates, slow rate of exploration, legal and regulatory wrangling, and challenging geology saw most major companies, including ExxonMobil, Marathon Oil, Eni, and Talisman Energy, pull out of the country. In 2014 Reuters reported that Chevron and ConocoPhillips are the only two major international companies left.

Nevertheless, Poland has more shale-gas exploration, drilling, and extraction in progress than any other European country.

Poland is highly dependent on coal for electrical generation. Unlike in most of Western Europe, Polish coal mines are still active. Methane in the mine workings poses safety problems. Most methane is currently treated as waste, but studies show that coalbed methane can be profitably used as a gas resource. As of 2010, Poland imports two-thirds of its natural gas from Russia. Tapping shale gas resources would greatly boost Poland's proven reserves, and lessen the importance of gas imports from Russia.

In June 2013 Occupy Chevron – an anti-fracking group occupied a field near the Polish village of Żurawlów, close to the city of Zamość. Opinions polls during the same year showed however that more than 70% of Poles were in favour of exploiting their shale resources.

In November 2018 the Polish finance ministry determined that Polish gas would be unprofitable mainly due to the potential taxes that would applied on the gas extraction. The Polish politicians have struggled to curb the near-total dominance of coal within the domestic energy system, but the high hopes placed on shale gas has been a result of overstated gas demand projections combined with insufficient assessment of available shale gas resources, caused by small amounts of research done on the deposits.

=== Romania ===
Romanian shale gas reserves could consolidate the country's role as the largest gas producer in Central Europe. In May 2012, the government temporarily suspended permits for shale gas exploration while waiting for the results of the EU's environmental studies on this energy source. In March 2013, Prime Minister Victor Ponta announced that the moratorium on shale gas exploration in Romania had been lifted. This decision could help boost domestic energy resources and reduce Romania's dependency on Russian gas. This decision sparked large nationwide protests aimed at banning the exploitation of shale gas and to remove the current government of Romania.

Romania's National Agency for Mineral Resources has launched a study to determine the level of national shale gas resources, whilst a study conducted by the US Energy Information Administration, based on estimates made without exploratory drilling, has put Romania's unproven wet shale gas technically recoverable resources (TRR) at a possible 1.4 trillion cubic metres (51 trillion cubic feet): the third largest deposit in Europe behind France and Poland.

Energy company Chevron holds a number of concessions in Romania and has announced plans to begin exploration work there in late 2013. National energy corporation Petrom is also conducting preliminary analyses of its concessions and Romgaz, MOL, Sterling and East-West, and Zeta Petroleum have also all expressed an interest in further opportunities in Romania.

Romania depends on imports to cover about 20% of its overall energy needs, according to data from the World Bank. Natural gas makes up close to 30% of national energy consumption. Of the total gas imported in 2010, (17% of the country's annual consumption) 98% of imports came from Russia. The recent US Energy Information Administration study has reported that there could be enough domestic shale gas to meet the country's needs for 100 years.

Aside from job creation, Chevron has said that its investment alone in the country could total $600 million over the next 15 years. This is before the investment of other oil and gas exploration companies is taken into account.

The Romanian government has come out in support of shale gas, citing energy independence and a decrease in the price of gas as motivations to pursue shale gas avenues. Energy Minister Constantin Niță has called for more exploration to determine the size of the shale gas deposits. Prime Minister Victor Ponta has also endorsed shale gas, saying he supports both exploration and exploitation.

=== Sweden ===
Royal Dutch Shell evaluated the viability of the Alum Shale in southern Sweden as a source of shale gas, but as of 2011 has declared that it is not viable and decided to abandon the operation.

Other companies, e.g. Gripen Gas and Aura Energy continue to drill, prospect and report good finds.

The company Gripen Gas completed test drillings outside Motala in the south-east of Sweden and reported that if all the gas were extracted, it would allow Sweden to keep up its current gas usage rate for 1,000 years. Gripen Gas announced in April 2012 the drilling results from their Ekeby Permit, onshore Sweden. Four shallow vertical wells tested the prospectivity of biogenic gas from the organic rich Cambro-Ordovician Alum Shale over an area covering about 150 km^{2}. The prospective Alum Shale was encountered at depths of 75–85 metres in the wells and all wells had gas shows whilst drilling. One well cored the Alum Shale section. All wells were drill stem tested. Gripen Gas confirmed in October 2012 that Bergsstaten (Swedish Mines Inspectorate) had awarded the Sandön exploration licence covering 162 km^{2} in the western part of lake Vättern, in Östergötland County. The exploration licence is for biogenic gas exploration in the organic rich Alum shale formation. This new award plus the existing licences make Gripen Gas AB the principal gas explorer in Sweden at 583 km^{2}.

Aura Energy's recent announcement that they are about to start drilling at their Motala shale gas project in Sweden, is further evidence of the growing interest in unconventional gas resources. The managing director of Aura Energy, Dr Bob Beeson, a professional geologist with over 35 years of experience in mineral exploration and development, explained the company's position in Sweden. "Aura's Motala Project covers approximately 140 square kilometres of the Alum Shale. Dr Beeson said he was very excited about the project's potential, particularly as the Motala shale may share some similarities with a highly successful play in North America. "Gas flows of up to 50 cubic metres per hour have been reported from drill holes used to extract water, so it is definitely worth investigation," he said. "Because of existing gas production in the region, rigs are available and we have already started to drill two out of the five holes."

=== Ukraine ===
Ukraine has Europe's 3rd largest shale gas reserves at 42 trillion cubic feet (1.2 trillion cubic meters).

Ukraine relies heavily on Russia for its gas imports. The EIA notes that the country produces 30% of its natural gas requirements and makes up the bulk from Russian and Turkmenistan imports. The administration states that its location makes it an important transit country for Russian gas supplies, and disputes have resulted in supply disruptions.

Shale gas discoveries are potentially changing the game. Shell has signed on to explore an area that government estimates indicate could have 113 Bcm (4 Tcf) in reserves.

The country's gas reserves have geologic similarities to its neighbor Poland, and the Lublin basin could be 10 to 15 times the size of the Barnett shale. It also suffers less from population and water issues that plague its neighbor to the northwest. But it suffers from the same bureaucratic issues that affect many other countries with shale deposits. "Lousy domestic policy remains the single greatest impediment to gas investments in Ukraine," said Edward Chow, a senior fellow at the Center of Strategic and International Studies.

Despite these issues, Chevron was proceeding with its plans to explore for shale in the Olesska field in the west of the country, according to Reuters. A government draft for a $10 billion shale gas production-sharing agreement has been approved. The draft was sent to the Cabinet of Ministers for a signature, the article states. On 15 December 2014, Chevron declared that it is pulling out of Ukraine due to the Governments inability to successfully reform the taxation system. Royal Dutch Shell received a shale agreement with the government earlier in 2013 to explore in Yuzivska in the Eastern part of the country, however it halted its activities due to the war in Donbas. The two projects could have result in 11 Bcm to 16 Bcm (388 Bcf to 563 Bcf) within five years, according to Reuters.

=== United Kingdom ===
Shale gas in the United Kingdom has attracted increasing attention since 2007, following the large-scale production of natural gas from shales in the US and Canada. A number of wells have been drilled and a single shale gas well has been hydraulically fractured, but as of 2019, there has been no commercial production of shale gas in the UK. On 1 November 2019, following a report from the Oil and Gas Authority, the government called a halt to all fracking in the UK "with immediate effect" and warned shale gas companies that it would not support future projects.

== See also ==
- Natural gas by country
- List of countries by recoverable shale gas
- Hydraulic fracturing by country
