= Alexandru Rafila =

Romanian politician (born 1961)

Dr. Alexandru Rafila M. D.
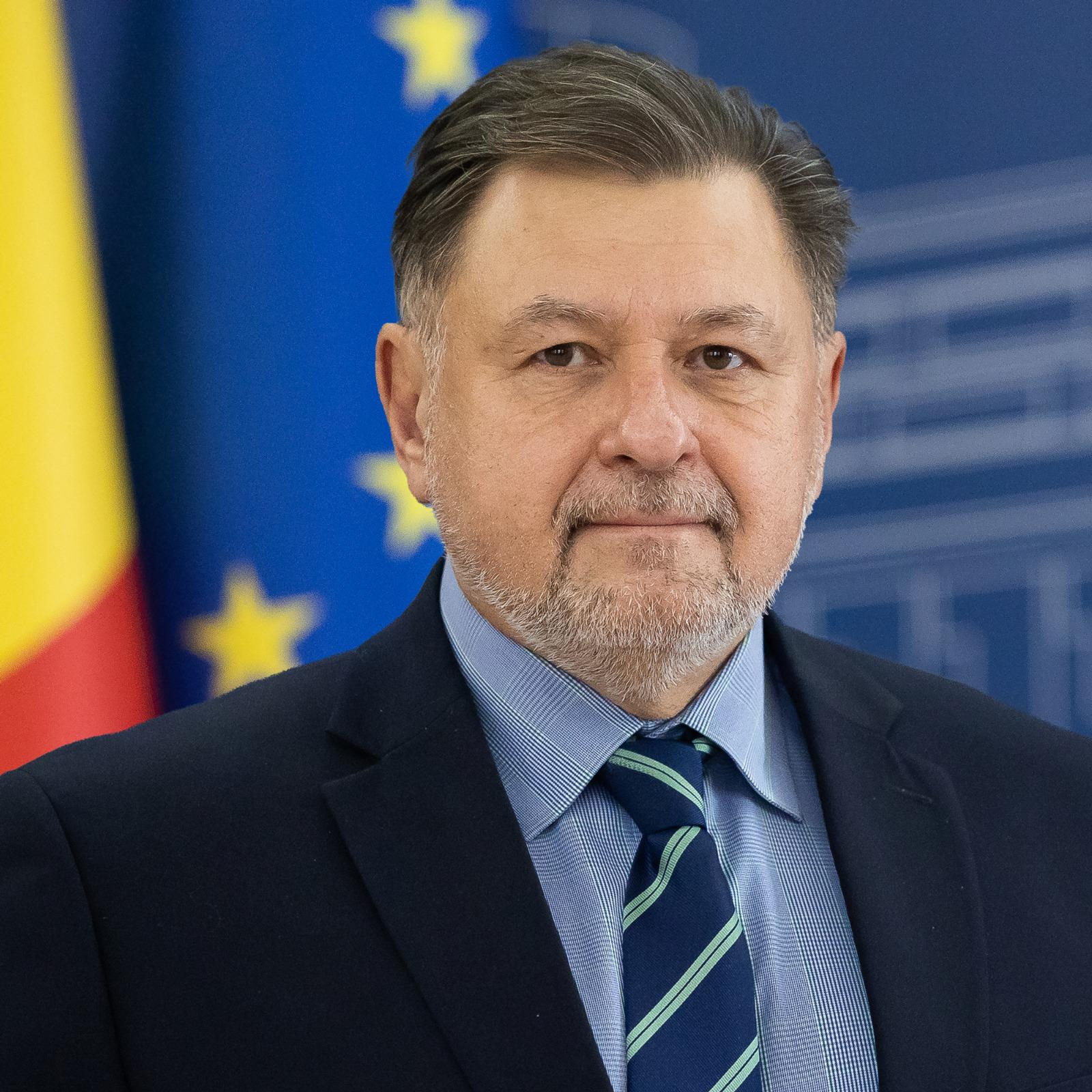
- Official portrait, 2021

Minister of Health
- In office 25 November 2021 – 23 June 2025
- Preceded by: Attila Cseke (Acting)
- Succeeded by: Alexandru Rogobete

Member of the Chamber of Deputies
- Incumbent
- Assumed office 21 December 2020
- Constituency: Bucharest

Personal details
- Born: December 27, 1961 (age 64) Bucharest, Romanian People's Republic
- Party: Social Democratic Party (PSD)
- Education: Carol Davila University of Medicine and Pharmacy (1987)

Alexandru Rafila (Romanian pronunciation: [alekˈsandru raˈfila]; born 27 December 1961) is a Romanian physician, academic and politician who served as the Minister of Health of Romania from 2021 until 2025.

== Biography ==
Rafila was admitted to a medical school in 1980. He graduated from college in 1987, did his internship at Sfântu Gheorghe and obtained a doctorate in medicine in 2004.

Rafila held the position of member of the Executive Committee of the World Health Organization (WHO) between 2014 and 2017 and represented Romania in the steering committee of the European Centre for Disease Prevention and Control (ECDC) between 2009 and 2014. Furthermore, he also represented Romania in the WHO on the steering committee of this organization until 2021.

Rafila is an active organizer and participant in numerous national and international medical conferences and events related to public health and microbiology. He is the author of several articles, manuals, book chapters and guides for public health practice and microbiology. He contributed decisively to the 2016 reestablishment of the speciality of Medical Microbiology in Romania, following recommendations from the European Union of Medical Specialists (UEMS), organization in which he used to represent Romania.

In October 2020, he rejoined the Social Democratic Party (PSD), having previously occupied the office of Vice-President of the Health Department of the party in the period of 2011 and 2012. After the 2020 Romanian legislative election, Rafila was PSD's proposal for the position of Prime Minister of Romania. He eventually became Health Minister of Romania in 2021 for the Ciucă Cabinet.
