= Ovidiu Ioan Silaghi =

Romanian politician (BORN 1962)

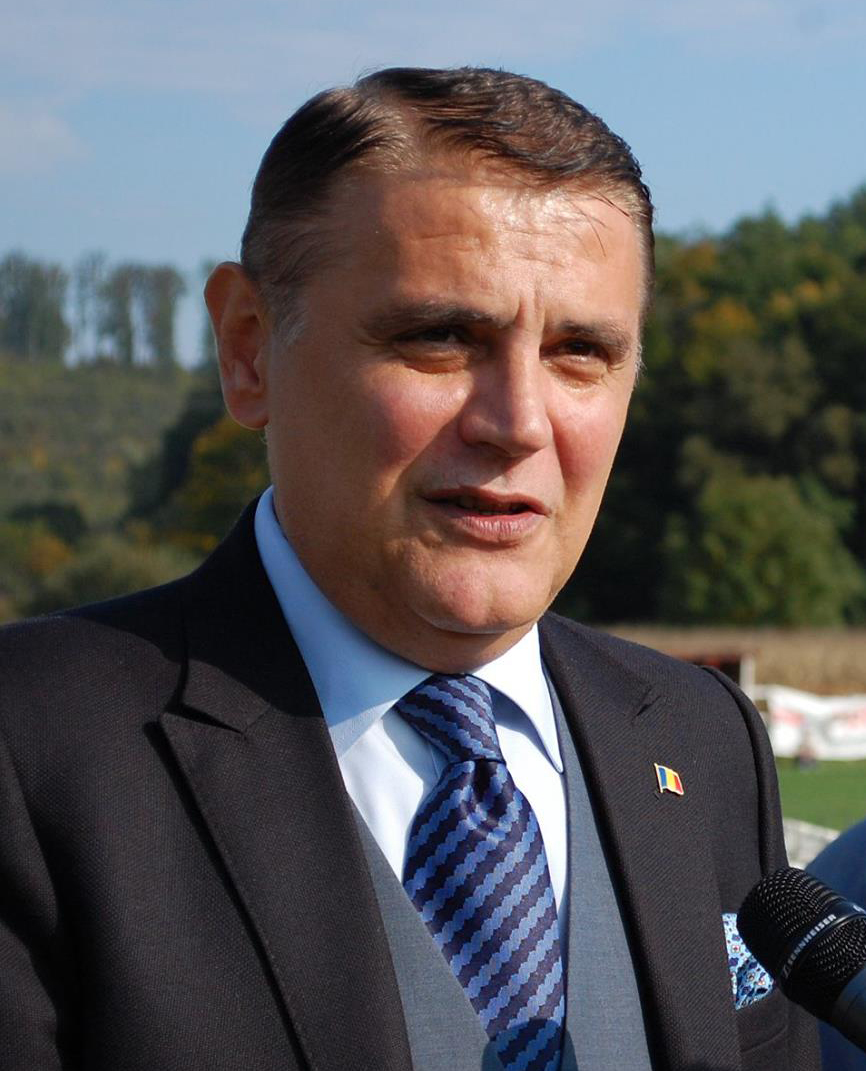

Minister of Transport
- In office 7 May 2012 – 21 December 2012

Minister of Small and Medium Enterprises, Commerce and Business Environment
- In office 5 April 2007 – 22 December 2008
- Succeeded by: Elena Udrea (Minister of Tourism; Constantin Niță (Minister of Small and Medium Enterprises, Commerce and Business Environment

Vice-Chair of European Parliament Committee on Budgetary Control
- In office 31 January 2007 – 2 April 2007

Member of the European Parliament
- In office 4 September 2013 – 10 June 2014
- In office 1 January 2007 – 02 April 2007

Member of the Romanian Parliament (Chamber of Deputies) for Satu Mare County
- Incumbent
- Assumed office 11 June 2014
- In office 2012 – 3 September 2013
- In office 17 December 2004 – 2008

President of the Chamber of Commerce, Industry and Agriculture of Satu Mare County
- In office 1996 – April 2007

Personal details
- Born: 12 December 1962 (age 63) Satu Mare, Satu Mare County, Romania
- Party: National Liberal Party (PNL); Alliance of Liberals and Democrats (ALDE)

Ovidiu Ioan Silaghi (Romanian pronunciation: [oˈvidju iˈo̯an ˈsilaɡi]; born 12 December 1962) is a Romanian politician. A member of the National Liberal Party (PNL), he became Minister for Small and Medium Enterprises in the second Călin Popescu-Tăriceanu cabinet (April 5, 2007).

== Biography ==
Born in Satu Mare, Satu Mare County, Socialist Republic of Romania, Silaghi graduated in Mechanical engineering from the Transylvania University of Braşov (1987), and later (2004) took a master's degree in Public administration from the Vasile Goldiş University in Arad. From the time of his graduation to 1990 (after the Romanian Revolution), he worked as an engineer in his native city, and soon after opened his own private enterprise. In 1999–2004, he was president of the Satu Mare Chamber of Commerce, Industry and Agriculture.

Silaghi joined the PNL in 1990, and was president of its youth wing section in Satu Mare until 1996, while serving as vice president of the main local section. He had other leadership positions until 2000, ultimately becoming president of the PNL section in 2001–2004, and a delegate to the central leadership body in 2002-2004. Between 2000 and 2004, Silaghi was also a member of the Satu Mare City Council.

In the elections of 2004, Silaghi was elected to the Chamber of Deputies for Satu Mare County, sitting on the Committee for Budget, Finance and Banks (until September 2005), the Committee for Information Technology and Communications (after September 2005), and the Committee for Industries and Services (after February 2007).

He became an observer to the European Parliament in September 2005. On 1 January 2007 he became a Member of the European Parliament for the PNL, part of the Alliance of Liberals and Democrats for Europe, with the accession of Romania to the European Union, before being nominated for a ministerial position in early 2007.

Silaghi is married and has two children.
