= Adrian Veștea =

Romanian politician (born 1973)

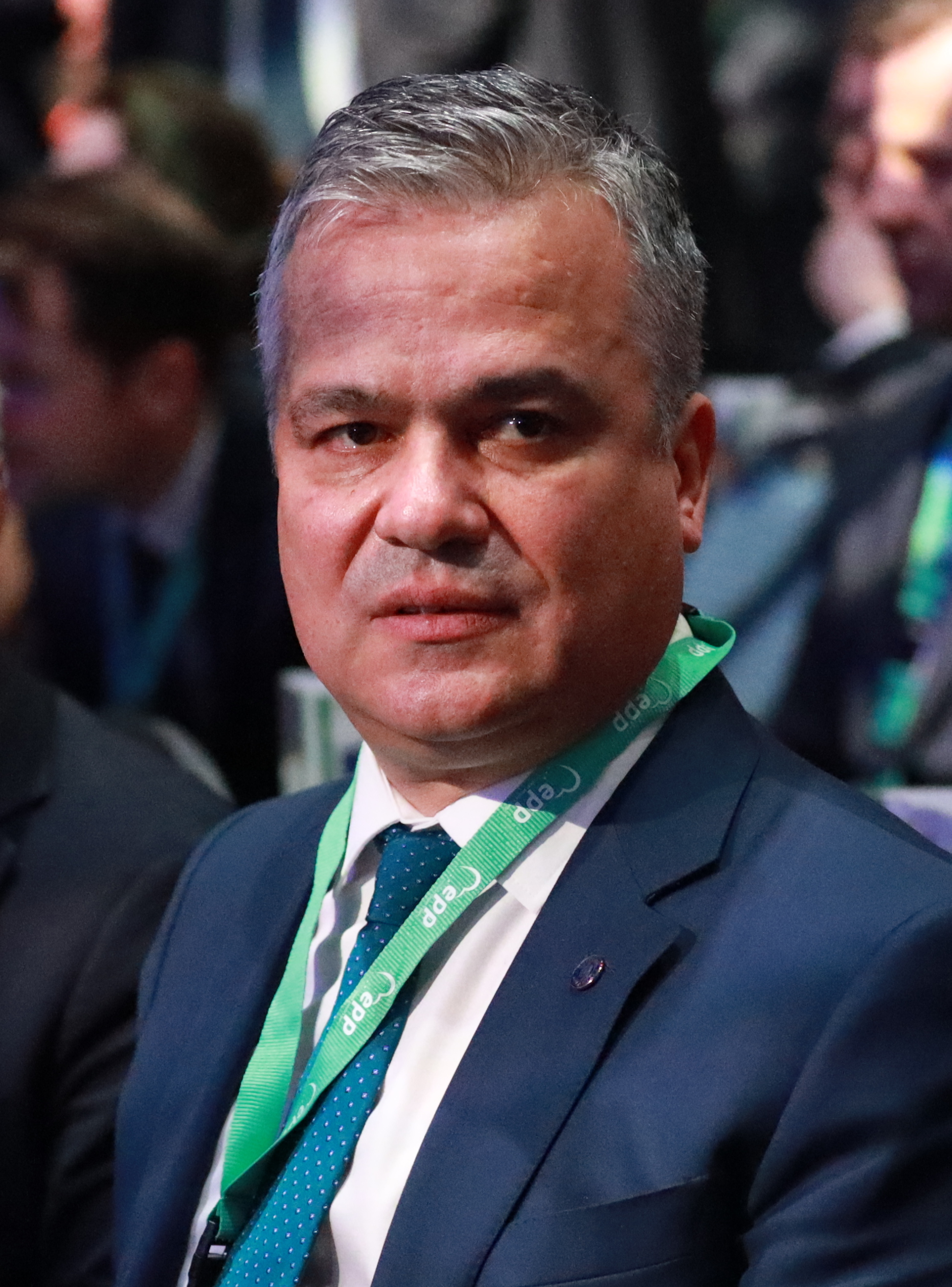
- Veștea in 2024

Minister for Development, Public Works and Administration
- In office 15 June 2023 – 20 November 2024
- Prime Minister: Marcel Ciolacu
- Preceded by: Attila Cseke
- Succeeded by: Attila Cseke

President of Brașov County Council
- Incumbent
- Assumed office 21 November 2024
- In office 5 June 2016 – July 2023
- Preceded by: Aristotel Căncescu

Mayor of Râșnov
- In office 20 June 2004 – 5 June 2016
- Succeeded by: Liviu Butnaru

Personal details
- Born: 14 December 1973 (age 52) Râșnov, Romania
- Party: Independent (since 2026)
- Other political affiliations: PNL (until 2026)
- Education: Bucharest Academy of Economic Studies; Lucian Blaga University of Sibiu

Adrian Ioan Veștea (Note: Romanian pronunciation: [adriˈan iˈo̯an ˈveʃte̯a]) (born 14 December 1973) is a Romanian politician, formerly of the National Liberal Party, who served as Minister of Development in the Ciolacu Cabinet from 15 June 2024 to 20 November 2025 and has since been serving as president of the Brașov county council. He also previously served as Mayor of Râșnov. Veștea was nominated as Prime Minister by President Nicușor Dan on 14 June 2026, but failed to secure a majority in parliament.

== Controversies ==
=== Râșnov land deal ===
In June 2026, following his nomination as prime minister-designate, an investigation by the outlet Snoop revealed a real-estate transaction dating from Veștea's tenure as mayor of Râșnov. According to the investigation, on 18 August 2007 Veștea, acting as a private individual, sold a plot of land near the town to North Capital Baltikum SRL—a company registered in Romania by a group of Norwegian investors—for 2.1 million lei (about €630,000 at the time), a sum recorded in his 2008 wealth declaration. About two months later, on 8 October 2007, Veștea signed, in his capacity as mayor, the urban planning certificate issued to the same company, and subsequently initiated the administrative steps to rezone the land. On 23 April 2008 he also signed the building permit for the company's project, a luxury tourist complex named Cold Mountain Luxury Resort. Veștea did not respond to journalists' requests for comment before publication. Asked about the matter in Parliament, PSD leader Sorin Grindeanu responded that anyone holding such information could file a complaint with the DNA.

=== Designation as Prime Minister and conflict with the PNL (2026) ===
On 14 June 2026, after the withdrawal of Eugen Tomac, President Nicușor Dan designated Veștea—then first vice-president of the PNL—as prime minister, without prior consultation with the party's leadership. Veștea accepted the designation without obtaining a mandate from the PNL, a decision that split the party between liberals who considered that he had betrayed the party line and those who supported him. PNL leader Ilie Bolojan described the designation as "a hostile act" and "an obvious attempt to break up the PNL", while MEP Gheorghe Falcă called him "the black swan of Brașov". The conflict centered on the party's stance toward a coalition with the PSD: the PNL had voted to go into opposition, whereas Veștea sought to form a political government with the PSD, holding negotiations with the social democrats and with the parliamentary group led by Victor Ponta, and counting on votes from AUR.

The PNL's National Political Bureau decided not to support Veștea and demanded that he relinquish his mandate, ruling that members who joined a government led by him would be expelled. Veștea refused to step down, and several liberals supporting him took the party to court, obtaining at the Ilfov Tribunal the suspension of some leadership decisions and later requesting the suspension of the extraordinary congress as well as 4 million lei in moral damages. At the PNL's party congress on 21 June 2026, delegates amended the party statute and re-elected Bolojan as president with 1,769 votes. The congress unanimously called for him, Lucian Bode, Rareș Bogdan, Hubert Thuma and Alina Gorghiu to resign from their party membership, ruling that, absent their resignations by 12:00 on 22 June 2026, expulsion procedures would be initiated.

On 22 June 2026, parliament rejected Vestea's nomination as prime minister, after he failed to win the 233-vote threshold from MPs and saw more than half of the chamber abstaining.
