= Alexandru Rogobete =

Romanian politician (born 1991)

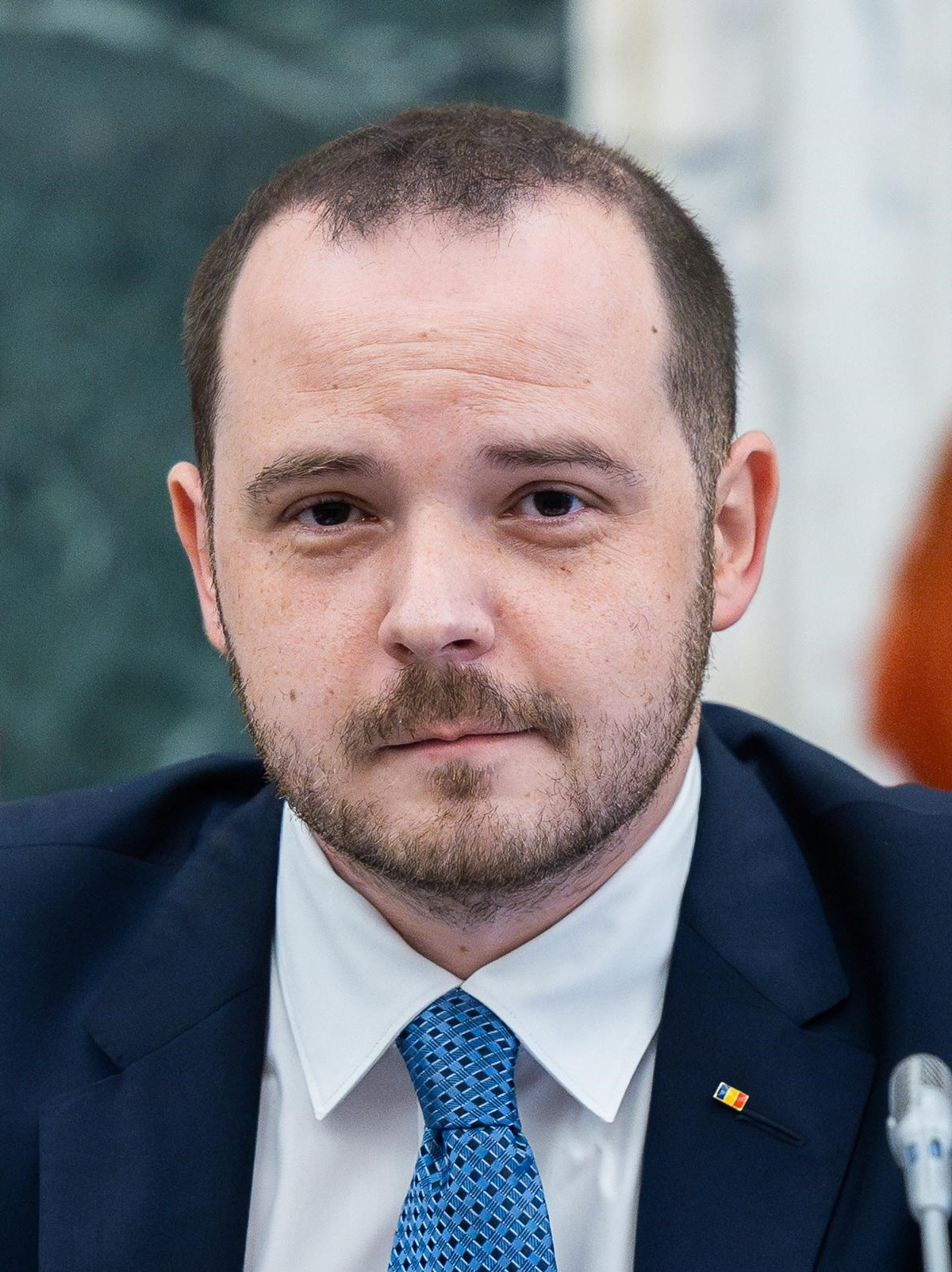
- Rogobete in 2025

Minister of Health
- Incumbent
- Assumed office 20 October 2026
- Preceded by: Attila Cseke (acting)
- In office 23 June 2025 – 25 April 2026
- Preceded by: Alexandru Rafila
- Succeeded by: Attila Cseke (acting)

Member of the Chamber of Deputies
- Incumbent
- Assumed office 20 December 2024
- Constituency: Prahova

Personal details
- Born: 21 April 1991 (age 35) Anina, Caraș-Severin County, Romania
- Party: Social Democratic
- Education: West University of Timișoara; Victor Babeș University of Medicine and Pharmacy of Timișoara

Alexandru-Florin Rogobete (born 21 April 1991) is a Romanian politician serving as a member of the Chamber of Deputies since 2024. He has served as chairman of the health and family committee since 2024.

Rogobete was born in Anina, Caraș-Severin County. He graduated from the Faculty of Chemistry, Biology, and Geography at the West University of Timișoara (2009–2013) and subsequently pursued a master's degree in Chemistry (2012–2015) at the same institution. He also graduated from the Faculty of Medicine at the Victor Babeș University of Medicine and Pharmacy of Timișoara (2012–2019) and completed a master's program in the Management of Social and Health Services and then obtained a PhD in Medicine from that university (2016–2024).
