= Tăriceanu Cabinet =

Tăriceanu Cabinet may refer to:

- Tăriceanu I Cabinet, the cabinet of the government of Romania between 2004 and 2007
- Tăriceanu II Cabinet, the cabinet of the government of Romania between 2007 and 2008
