= Alexandru Stoica =

Alexandru Stoica may refer to:

- Alexandru Stoica (politician) (born 1990), Romanian politician
- Alexandru Iulian Stoica (1997–), Romanian footballer
- Alexandru Ionuț Stoica (2000–), Romanian footballer
