= Anton Anton =

Romanian engineer and politician

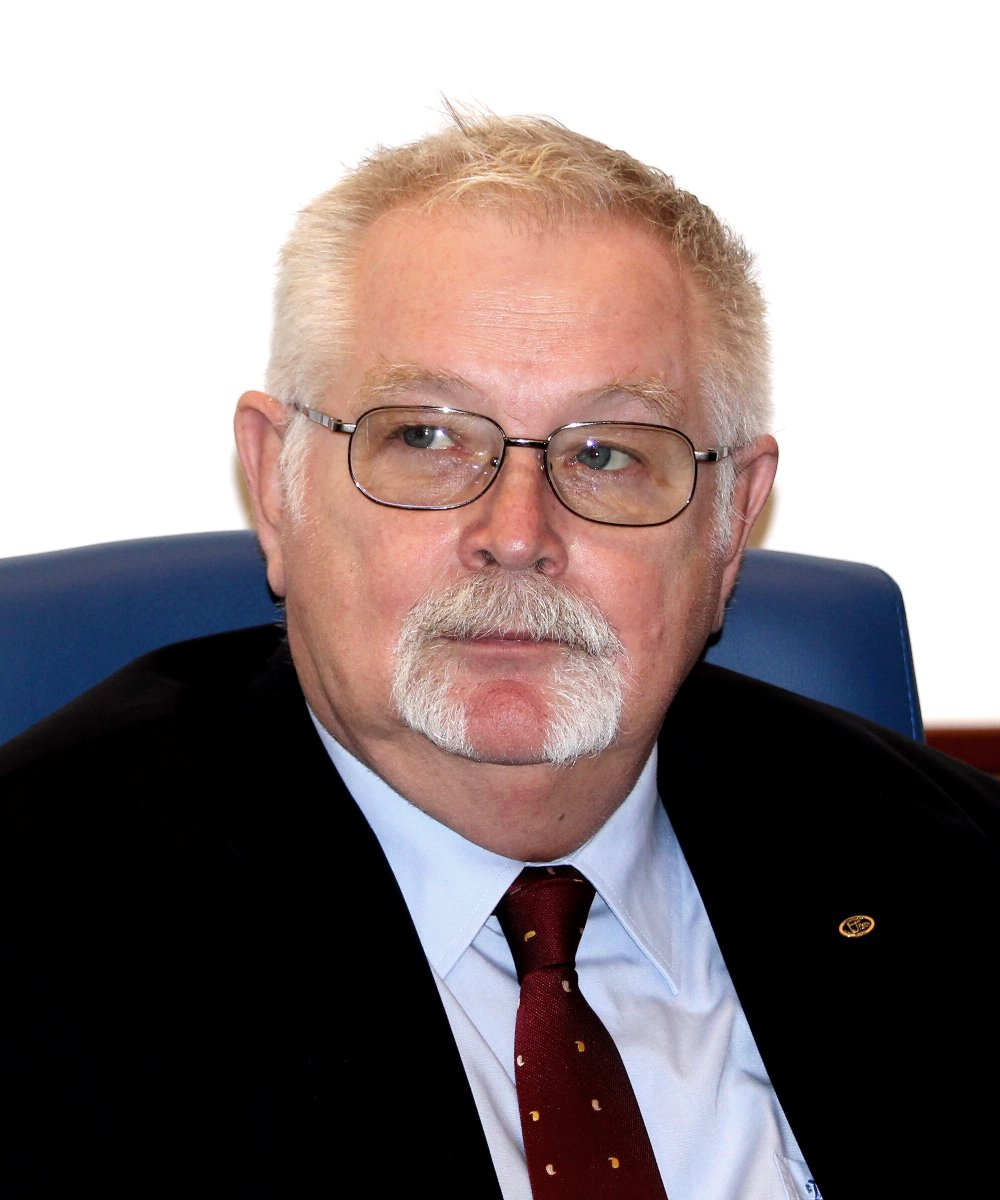
- Anton in 2017

Minister of Energy
- In office 29 January 2018 – 27 August 2019
- Prime Minister: Viorica Dăncilă
- Preceded by: Toma-Florin Petcu
- Succeeded by: Virgil-Daniel Popescu

Minister of Education, Research and Youth
- In office 8 October 2008 – 22 December 2008
- Prime Minister: Călin Popescu-Tăriceanu
- Preceded by: Cristian Adomniței
- Succeeded by: Monica Iacob Ridzi

Personal details
- Born: 22 December 1949 (age 76) Timișoara, Romania
- Party: Alliance of Liberals and Democrats; National Liberal Party
- Education: Politehnica University of Timișoara; University of Bucharest; Johns Hopkins University
- Occupation: Engineer, politician
- Website: www.antonanton.ro (Archived 1 December 2008)

Anton Anton (born 22 December 1949) is a Romanian engineer and politician. A member of the Alliance of Liberals and Democrats (ALDE) and previously of the National Liberal Party (PNL), he served as minister of Education, Research and Youth in the Tăriceanu II Cabinet from October to December 2008, and from 2018 to 2019 served in the Dăncilă Cabinet as Minister of Energy.

He is married.

== Biography ==
He was born in Timișoara, attending the Polytechnic University of Timișoara from 1967 to 1972 and becoming an engineer. From 1973 to 1974, he pursued post-graduate studies in Information Science and Mathematics at the University of Bucharest. He was a Fulbright scholar at Johns Hopkins University in 1977, and from that year until 1986, worked on an Engineering doctorate at the Bucharest Construction Institute (ICB; now the Technical University of Civil Engineering of Bucharest, UTCB). Anton began teaching and researching at ICB in 1972; he was a faculty assistant until 1979 and head of the hydraulics laboratory from 1972 to 2003. From 1979 to 1990, he was chief of operations at ICB, with similar duties. From 1990 to 1995, he was a reader there, and has been a professor at UTCB since 1995. Additionally, he is a prorector at the university since 2008. Among his areas of expertise are ferrous hydrodynamics, experimental hydraulics, hydraulic machines and urban engineering. He holds four patents; has published seven books, including a 2001 one on hydraulic networks that received the Anghel Saligny Prize from the Romanian Academy; and has published 80 articles in scientific journals in Romania and abroad. He has been a member of the European Academy of Sciences and Arts since 2004.

Anton joined the PNL in 1995. From 2005 to 2006, he was a state secretary at the Education Ministry. From 2006 to October 2008, he was president of the National Authority for Scientific Research, an agency of the ministry. On 8 October, following the dismissal of Cristian Adomniței, he was named to the Tăriceanu II Cabinet, serving until the government's term ended on 22 December 2008. At the time, the press noted that Tăriceanu had taught at ICB from 1980 to 1991, and that the former colleagues had remained friends. Also noted was that Anton would have to continue negotiations with teachers' unions, and the possibility of a strike if salaries were not raised. At his investiture, president Traian Băsescu noted Anton was the fourth Education Minister of the 2004-2008 legislature, and "hopefully" the last. Anton ran for a Timișoara seat in the Chamber of Deputies at the November 2008 election, but was defeated. Running on the ALDE ticket, he won a Bucharest seat in the 2016 election. In January 2018, he entered the Dăncilă Cabinet as Energy Minister. Anton resigned after ALDE withdrew from the cabinet on 27 August 2019.
