= Ministry of Small and Medium Enterprises, Commerce and Business Environment (Romania) =

Government ministry of Romania

- Formation: April 2007
- First holder: Ovidiu Ioan Silaghi
- Website: www.mimmctpl.ro

The Ministry of Small and Medium Enterprises, Commerce and Business Environment of Romania (Romanian: Ministerul Întreprinderilor Mici şi Mijlocii, Comerţ şi Mediu de Afaceri) was one of the ministries of the Government of Romania.

The Ministry was founded during the Tăriceanu II government, and was known as the "Ministry of Small and Medium Enterprises, Commerce, Tourism and Liberal Occupations". During the Boc I government, the tourism portfolio was split off to form a separate Ministry of Tourism.

It was dissolved in December 2009.
