= Fracking by country =

Fracking has become a contentious environmental and health issue with Tunisia and France banning the practice and a de facto moratorium in place in Quebec (Canada), and some of the states of the US.

== Australia ==
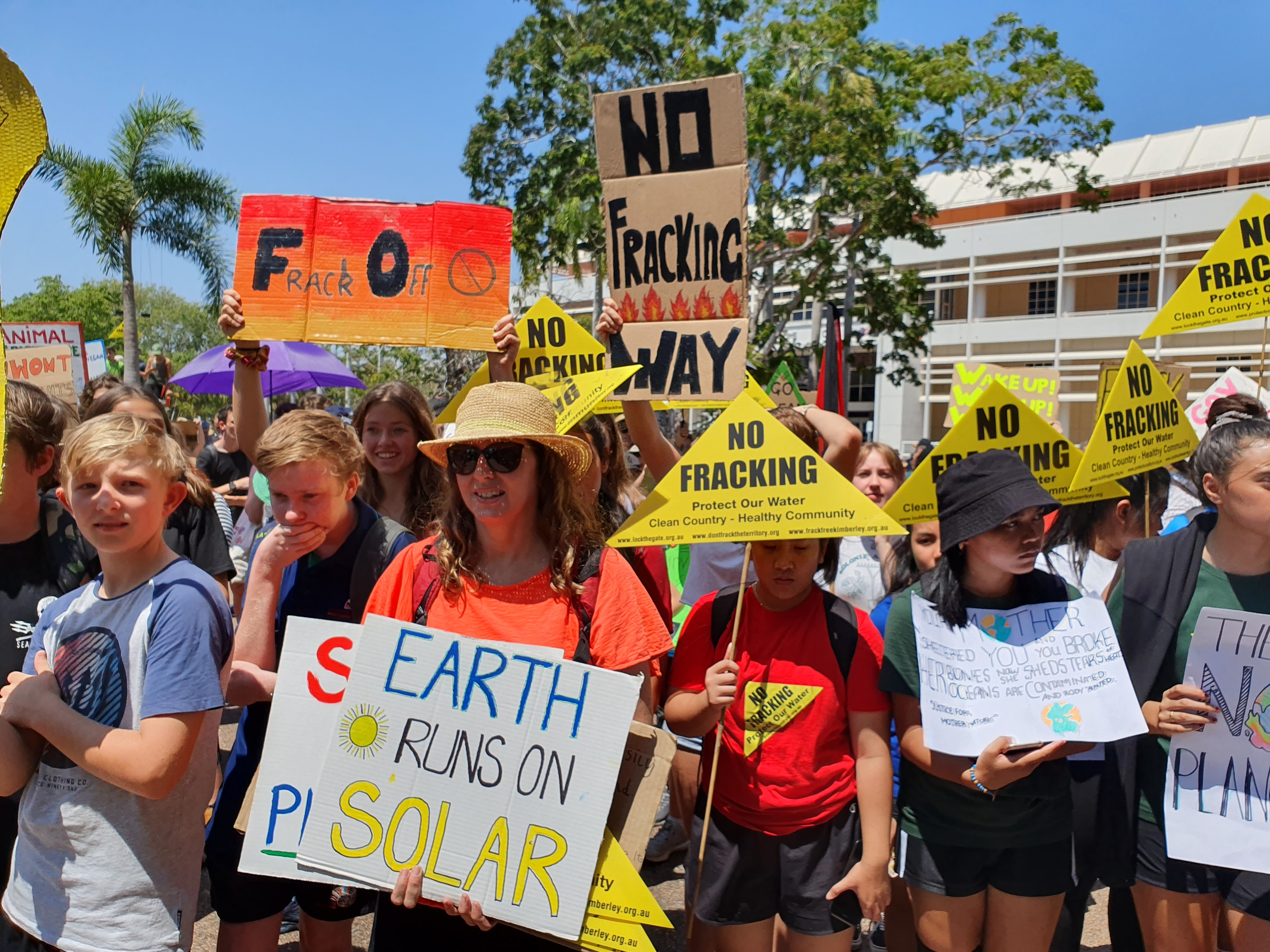
September 2019 climate strike in Darwin, Australia

Up until the mid-2000s, hydraulic fracturing was generally limited to conventional oil and gas wells in the Cooper Basin. This was limited to one, two, or sometimes zero ongoing fracturing operations. The vast majority of coal seam gas wells have not been hydraulically fractured as the wells presently being drilled are in coal seams that have good natural permeability. The NSW Government has banned BTEX chemicals as additives. As of September 2016, Victoria has permanently banned hydraulic fracturing and all forms of unconventional gas extraction. In 2021, Victoria put a fracking ban in the Victorian Constitution. This policy in the Victorian constitution, makes it harder for future governments to change the law.

The Beetaloo Basin, in Arnhem Land in the Northern Territory, has been opened up for fracking, but both pastoralists and the traditional Aboriginal caretakers of the land alike fear that rivers and water sources in the region could be polluted by the waste produced in the fracking process. In addition, Indigenous rangers working in the new Indigenous Protected Area in Mimal are very concerned about the level of greenhouse gases which would be released by the fracking work, potentially jeopardising Australia's Paris emissions reduction target. Fracking has been physically blockaded and disrupted at a number of sites across Australia. An occupation involving thousands of people in 2014 led to the state government suspending miner Metagasco's licence to drill at Bentley, NSW. Communities in areas such as at Tara, Glenugie, Doubtful Creek and Fullerton Cove have also engaged in protest and direct action.

== Bulgaria ==
A number of protests occurred in Bulgaria after the government's decision to grant an approval for Chevron Corporation to research the possibilities of shale gas extraction in the country's northeast in 2011. After a nationwide protest in January 2012, the government decided to ban the hydraulic fracturing technology.

== Canada ==
Fracking has been in common use by the petroleum industry in Canada since at least the mid-1960s. Massive hydraulic fracturing has been widely used in Alberta since the late 1970s to recover gas from low-permeability sandstones of the Spirit River Formation. The method is currently used in development of the Cardium, Duvernay, Montney and Viking in Alberta, Bakken in Saskatchewan, Montney and Horn River in British Columbia.

Concerns about fracking began in late July 2011, when the Government of British Columbia gave Talisman Energy a long-term water licence to draw water from the BC Hydro-owned Williston Lake reservoir, for a twenty-year term. Fracking has also received criticism in New Brunswick and Nova Scotia, and the Nova Scotia government is currently reviewing the practice, with recommendations expected in March 2012. The practice has been temporarily suspended in parts of Quebec, pending an environmental review. The Canadian Centre for Policy Alternatives has also expressed concern.

During October 2013 public conflict began between the Elsipogtog First Nation in New Brunswick and the hydraulic fracturing company SWN. Fuelling the conflict were SWN's plans to use the land of the Elsipogtog Nation for fracking. The First Nations people of the area had previously raised concerns about the environmental impacts of fracking as well as the government's failure to consult with them. Public protests began when the First Nations people realized their voice was not being heard. Much of the media coverage on the protests has portrayed the First Nations people as violent and destructive. However, what most people do not know is that the land in question is legally First Nation land. The Peace and Friendship Treaties of 1760–1761 did not cede land or resources, the government of Canada does not own the land and therefore cannot legally permit SWN to use the land for fracking purposes. On 6 December, SWN announced it was stopping fracking for the year, leaving the job incomplete.

Four out of Canada's 10 provinces currently have province-wide bans on fracking: the provinces of New Brunswick, Newfoundland and Labrador, Nova Scotia and Quebec. In Newfoundland and Labrador this was achieved through the mobilisation of rural communities which engaged in protest activities.

== China ==
China completed its first horizontal shale gas well in 2011 and 200 by 2014. A global shale gas study by the US Energy Information Administration said China's technically recoverable shale gas reserves were almost 50% higher than those of the number two nation, the United States. Regulation of the sector in the country, however, could change its characteristics in the future.

== Denmark ==
In 2012, the first research for shale gas has begun in Denmark, where Total E&P Denmark B.V., a subsidiary of Total S.A., has been granted two exploration licenses in collaboration with the Danish State's oil- and gas company, Nordsøfonden. The exploration license, which runs until 2016, covers the two areas Nordjylland and Nordsjælland, where the geological characteristics are expected to provide the best potential for shale gas.

Danish national media have so far covered both pros and cons of shale gas production and fracking, and a minor NGO has been formed to protest against shale gas. The acknowledged green think tank Concito has produced a report that states, that it will be both practically and technically feasible to establish shale gas production in Denmark without having to fear of contamination of drinking water or the release of methane from wells.

== France ==
Hydraulic fracturing was banned in France in 2011 after public pressure. It was based on the precautionary principle as well as the principal of preventive and corrective action of environmental hazards, using the best available techniques with an acceptable economic cost to insure the protection, the valuation, the restoration, management of spaces, resources and natural environments, of animal and vegetal species, of ecological diversity and equilibriums. The ban was upheld by an October 2013 ruling of the Constitutional Council following complaints by US-based company Schuepbach Energy.

In December 2017, to fight against global warming, France adopted a law banning new fossil fuel exploitation projects and closing current ones by 2040 in all of its territories. France thus became the first country to programme the end of all fossil fuel exploitation.

== Germany ==
Massive hydraulic fracturing of gas wells in tight sandstone began in Germany in 1975, and became common during the period 1978–1985, when more wells received massive hydraulic fracs in Germany than in any other European country. Germany also had the largest hydraulic fracturing jobs in Europe, using up to 650 tonnes of proppant per well. Most German fracs used water- or oil-based gels. The most popular target formation for hydraulic fracturing was the Rotliegend Sandstone. Hydraulically fractured wells are today the source of most of German natural gas production.

In February 2013, the government of Chancellor Angela Merkel announced draft regulations that would allow for the exploitation of shale gas deposits using the same fracking techniques common in the U.S., with the exception only of wetland areas that make up just over 10% of German territory. The draft legislation had come from the Federal Department of Economics, then headed by the party head of Merkel's coalition partner, the pro-business free Democrats. This policy was said to be motivated by fears that consistently high energy costs were harming German industry, facing competitors for example from the U.S. where energy prices had shrunk to less than 25% of German energy costs.

However these plans immediately drew massive critique both from opposition parties and elements of Merkel's own CDU, as well as from major NGOs, large parts of the press and the general public. Within less than a month, the original plan was put on ice for the foreseeable future and a moratorium was declared. Ever since shale gas fracking has de facto been banned in Germany and the stance of the newly formed Grand Coalition government expressed in the coalition treaty is that gas exploration will not be pursued in the country under this government. Here is an excerpt from the coalition contract:

Fracking

According to available studies on its environmental relevance, the fracking technology in unconventional natural gas production – particularly in shale gas production – is a technology with enormous potential risks. The effects on humans, nature and the environment are scientifically not yet sufficiently clarified. Drinking water and health have absolute priority for us.

We reject the use of environmentally toxic substances in the application of fracking technology for exploration and extraction of unconventional natural gas deposits. A request for approval can only be decided upon when the necessary data basis for evaluation exists and is clarified beyond doubt that any adverse change in water quality can be ruled out (precautionary principle of the Water Resources Act). The disposal of flowback from fracking operations with the use environmentally toxic chemicals in injection wells is currently not justifiable due to lack of knowledge of the risks involved.

The Coalition will work – with the involvement of federal states and science – in a collaborative process with the companies. The industry will need to explain the specific objectives of their explorations campaigns which specific findings to eliminate gaps in knowledge and to provide a sufficient basis for possible subsequent steps. This should be done in a transparent process. In a dialogue with all stakeholders – under the auspices of the scientific community – research results will be shared and discussed. The Coalition will soon submit legal changes for a better protection of the drinking water in the Water Provision Act and new Regulations on the Environmental Impact Assessment (EIA) for mining projects. A mandatory EIA and public participation will be required for the licensing of exploration and production of natural gas from unconventional deposits.

Although German laws de jure explicitly prohibit only the use of hydraulic fracturing in designated water preserves, fracking operations generally need be authorized by the government, which has publicly declared a moratorium until long-term damage to residents or the environment brought about by fracking can be ruled out or until alternative extraction methods become available that don't rely on the injection of toxic chemical additives in the fluid system.

In June 2016 German politicians passed a law banning fracking, with limited exceptions for scientific and non-commercial projects. Wintershall and ExxonMobil will now have to abandon their plans to frack in Germany.

== Ireland ==
Fracking is banned on the Irish Onshore and within its internal waters. This followed extensive campaigning and protests by farmers and environmentalists.

== Netherlands ==
In the Netherlands, over 200 wells have so far been hydraulically fractured. Between 2007 and 2011, 22 wells (9 onshore and 13 offshore) were hydraulically fractured.

A temporary moratorium on fracking for shale gas was enacted in September 2013 pending further research.

== New Zealand ==
In New Zealand, hydraulic fracturing is part of petroleum exploration and extraction on a small scale mainly in Taranaki and concerns have been raised by environmentalists.

== Poland ==
Poland is aggressively developing its shale gas reserves, thought to be the largest in Europe, though the latest estimate is significantly lower than that previously provided by the U.S. Department of Energy. A Polish Geological Institute study published in March 2012 concluded that, while fracking at one site had produced toxic waste, the latter was reused and did not harm the environment, though critics said the study was carried out at the start of exploration in Poland and does not reflect dangers from a long-term activity. Large-scale fracking in Poland would relieve some of the EU's dependency on Russian gas, but the Central European state is densely populated and has a large agricultural sector, meaning the massive amounts of water required for fracking have raised additional concerns.

== Romania ==
On 17 October 2013, people in the Pungesti village protested against hydraulic fracturing done by Chevron. Two hundred gendarmes were sent to stop the protest. The land on which Chevron is trying to build the well belonged to the village council but was acquired by the mayor in a way contested by the villagers. The mayor is presumed to have been paid by Chevron in order to permit the building of a gas-well, and a referendum was held to force the mayor to resign.

On 6 and 7 December 2013, protesters tried to stop MIF S.A., a contractor for Chevron, from starting the work at this site and the government brought three hundred gendarmes to keep the protesters away. Protesters clashed with the gendarmes and there were about 50 arrests made. Many protesters claimed they were abused and injured by the government forces. The county police chief instituted a state of necessity barring citizens to travel in or out of that area, imposed a curfew and interdicted any public assembly.

In February 2015 Chevron gave up on its fracking activities in Romania, with the company no longer pursuing shale gas exploration in Europe.

== South Africa ==
Currently around 77% of South Africa's energy generation comes from coal. By the time the last two coal-fired plants come on line, including the world's 4th largest coal-fired power plant, it is estimated that South Africa will be generating 94% of its domestic energy from coal. The South African government is currently (2014) strongly campaigning for fracking to be rolled-out across much of the country to act as a "bridge-fuel" between coal and alternative fuels. However, recent studies show that the loss of methane to the environment during production, transportation, and power generation is considerable, potentially negating benefits. This means that a move to natural gas may have greater greenhouse gas effects than continuing with coal power in the short- and medium-term.

Three companies have received permits to frack roughly 1/5th of the area of South Africa. Shell's portion covers roughly 90,000 km^{2}, Falcon's covers 32,000 km^{2}, and Challenger Energy's (Bundu) covers 3,200 km^{2}. Due to considerable public pressure, a temporary moratorium on hydraulic fracturing for shale gas in South Africa's Karoo region was imposed in July 2011, to examine concerns about safety and environmental degradation, particularly that of water safety. Following the announcement of the moratorium in April 2011, a task team appointed by Mineral Resources minister Susan Shabangu was appointed to investigate the feasibility and environmental impact on fracking. The moratorium was lifted on 7 September 2012, with the team's report not having been made public, and the task team having "met in total secrecy".

=== Rationale for lifting the moratorium ===
The government's rationale for lifting the moratorium included the creation of up to 700 000 jobs, an injection into the economy of up to 200 billion rands ($19.56 billion) a year, and the reduction of reliance on coal energy. With an estimated 13.7 trillion cubic meters of recoverable gas, one study claims that the Karoo could hold enough gas to supply South Africa for 400 years. Despite these benefits, activists vehemently opposed the move by the government and the ruling party, the ANC, and made a series of well-publicised protests at the end of September 2012. Companies are allowed to proceed with the initial stages of exploration, including geological field mapping and other data gathering activities, until such time as an appropriate regulatory framework has been put in place. Actual fracking activities, essential during the later stages of exploration when determining the financial viability of a potential project, would for the time being remain prohibited until a legal framework has been completed. Initial exploration would go a long way towards confirming whether the Karoo indeed held the estimated technically recoverable resource of 485 trillion cubic feet (Tcf) of gas.

=== Opposition to fracking ===
However, local South African campaigners argue that exploration represents the thin-edge of the corporate wedge, and should not go ahead because of concerns about air pollution, groundwater contamination, and health risks associated with fluid additives used for fracturing. Environmental campaigners point out that many of the jobs will go to foreign expertise, little of the money will end up in local hands, and that the natural gas which is made producible by fracturing is not a "bridge" fuel because it produces as much in greenhouse emissions as coal. The karoo, famous for the quality of its lamb, is an arid region that it is largely reliant on underground water for agriculture and drinking supplies.

Organisations in South Africa that oppose fracking include Earthlife Africa Greenpeace, CASABIO, The Home of Biodiversity, The Wildlife and Environment Society of South Africa (WESSA),/ a Facebook group "Stop Fracking", and Treasure the Karoo Action Group (TKAG). Jonathan Deal, CEO of TKAG has also helped form the Sustainable Alternatives to Fracking and Exploration (SAFE) Alliance. This alliance includes The Wilderness Foundation, TKAG, the Endangered Wildlife Trust (EWT), and the African Conservation Trust (ACT).

=== Notable meetings ===
In August 2011, a public forum was held at Kelvin Grove in Cape Town by Shell's environmental consultant, Golder Associates. Lewis Pugh delivered a speech which received a standing ovation from the attending public. He stated that: Never, ever did I think that there would be a debate in this arid country about which was more important – gas or water. We can survive without gas... We cannot live without water. If we damage our limited water supply – and fracking will do just that – we will have conflict again here in South Africa. His final statement was: I have no doubt, that in the end, good will triumph over evil. After Pugh's speech, Bonang Mohale, Shell's representative, announced in reference to fracking that: We will leave the Karoo better than it was when we found it, and: There is zero chance that there will be any contamination of the water. Mohale was effectively silenced by his colleagues after ongoing derision at his statements from the public. Shell was also asked what would happen to the gas. A Shell representative replied that: Shell doesn't expect the gas reserves to be very large, therefore they will be generating electricity and distributing it directly. Shell also agreed to disclose the chemicals they would use in fracking, their water sources and waste disposal methodology. As of 2018, Shell's three exploration licence applications in Karoo have not been granted.

=== Water boreholes ===
Hydraulic fracturing has regularly been used to improve the performance of water boreholes. In the case of water boreholes it is often referred to as hydrofracturing. From 1990 to 1992, 170 boreholes had been hydrofractured in South Africa.

== Tunisia ==
Members of the Constituent Assembly belonging to president Moncef Marzouki's party, the Congress For the Republic, have sponsored a bill for the moratorium of hydraulic fracturing on 6 February 2014.

== Ukraine ==
Ukraine has a long history of hydraulic fracturing, since it has been used there since the 1950s. There has also been a strong recent interest of the hydraulic fracturing industry in Ukraine. According to the U.S. Energy Information Administration, Ukraine has third-largest shale gas reserves in Europe at 128 trillion cubic feet. Since 2011, approximately 22 domestic and foreign-owned companies have been engaged in hydraulic fracturing in Ukraine.

But this growing industry presence is hampered by major obstacles. At least two companies have backed out of a deal to extract shale gas in Eastern Ukraine due to the threat of military action in that area. There are also other challenges to hydraulic fracturing in Ukraine, such as a lack of a proper regulatory framework for its development, opposition of major EU partners to hydraulic fracturing which may seek to influence Ukraine (France for example has an outright ban).

Constitutionally, Ukraine's natural resources belong to the people, with government acting as a trustee. Under Ukraine's constitution, a private investor would need to execute a production-sharing agreement, but would not be entitled to 100% of its production as it has to be shared with the state. The level of potential public opposition to hydraulic fracturing also creates uncertainty. Ukraine's shale gas reserves are deeper than those in the United States, and thus production is bound to be more expensive, which may make it cost-prohibitive, depending on the prevailing market prices for gas. Ukraine continues to vigorously pursue reforms designed to achieve energy independence, which portends well for hydraulic fracturing as a helpful option in that regard.

== United Kingdom ==
Although hydraulic fracturing in the United Kingdom has been common in North Sea oil and gas fields since the late 1970s, and has been used in about 200 British onshore oil and gas wells since the early 1980s, the technique did not attract public attention until its use was proposed for onshore shale gas wells in 2007. As of Jan 2014, the only hydraulic fracturing job that has been performed for shale gas in the United Kingdom was by Cuadrilla Resources in 2011. Other companies have exploration licenses. The process was unofficially suspended for nearly a year in the UK from June 2011 after safety concerns emerged from the occurrence of two small earthquakes, but an expert report in April 2012 concluded the practice could continue under stricter monitoring.

The Royal Academy of Engineering under the banner of the Royal Society published a report in June 2012 that covered all aspects of the technology, and this has informed extensive legislation with the many government licensing authorities, including the requirement that only non hazardous chemicals may be used (see Hydraulic Fracturing in the UK for complete details).

Protest groups have emerged since April 2012, with a major nationwide group being Frack Off with further local groups. As of 2013 the government was optimistic about development of the shale gas industry and was offering favorable tax treatment at a time when local budgets are being slashed.

The Scottish Government has implemented a moratorium to prevent fracking in Scotland. The block was imposed in January 2015 through the planning and environmental permitting systems, pending the devolution of full powers over fracking to the Scottish Government as per the Smith Commission. This moratorium was extended in October 2017, and made 'indefinite' in October 2019. Several environmental groups and opposition parties in the Scottish Parliament stated that a moratorium was inadequate, and a full legal ban was required.

A similar temporary moratorium was announced for Wales by the Welsh Government in February 2015. This policy was formalised in July 2018, and made permanent in December 2018, following the devolution of full powers over onshore petroleum exploration in October 2018.

There is, as of September 2021, a 'presumption against fracking' in Northern Ireland. This is enforced through the planning system, and was introduced in September 2015.

In March 2019, the High Court found the UK government's policy was unlawful and failed to consider the climate impact of shale gas extraction.

In November 2019 the UK government imposed a moratorium against fracking in England. In February 2022, with the moratorium in England still in effect, the UK Government's Oil and Gas Authority ordered the UK's only two shale gas wells, both located at a site in Lancashire, England, to be sealed and abandoned.

== United States ==
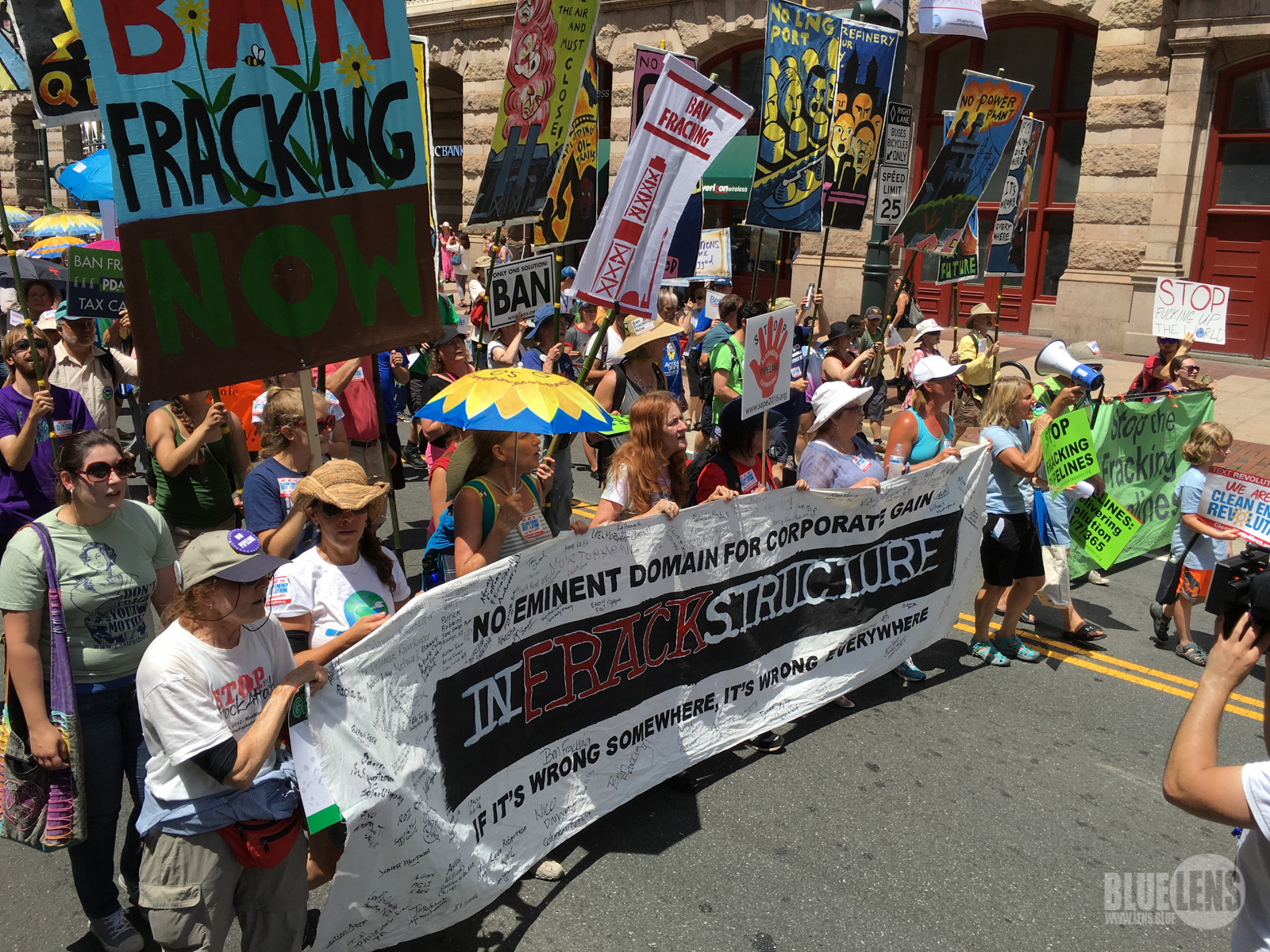
Clean Energy March in Philadelphia

Hydraulic fracturing was exempted from underground injection controls of the Safe Drinking Water Act by the Energy Policy Act of 2005. The Fracturing Responsibility and Awareness of Chemicals Act (later called the FRAC Act) was introduced to end the exemption of hydraulic fracturing practices from the Clean Water Act. This measure was proposed first in 2009 and later in 2011, however failed to pass in Congress on both occasions. Lack of federal regulation for hydraulic fracturing has allowed U.S. States great latitude to decide their own policy, leading to varied regulations across the United States. State policies have been influenced by many factors, including local public opinions on fracking, natural gas reserves within the state, and industrial lobbying.

In May 2012, the state of Vermont became the first state to outlaw hydraulic fracturing; New York, which unlike Vermont has significant gas reserves, banned the practice in December 2014. Maryland introduced a temporary fracking ban in 2015, which was made permanent in 2017. Washington joined these states by banning hydraulic fracturing in May 2019.

A type of fracking technique called slickwater fracking was used in Texas in 1998 to complete natural gas wells in the Barnett Shale. This type of completion was made possible by a number of advances in directional drilling and microseismic 3-dimensional imaging supported by the Department of Energy and other federal agencies, Drilling into shale now accounts for 30 percent of US gas production. This method of well completion has become controversial in high-activity states like Texas, Pennsylvania, Arkansas, West Virginia, Oklahoma, and Ohio, because of the complaints about pollution, health effects and earthquakes.

== See also ==
- Directional drilling
- Environmental impact of fracking
- Environmental impact of the oil shale industry
- Health and environmental impact of the petroleum industry
- ExxonMobil Electrofrac
- List of countries by recoverable shale gas
- Shale gas by country
