= List of countries by recoverable shale gas =

A map of 48 shale basins in 38 countries, based on US Energy Information Administration data, 2011.

This is a list of countries by recoverable shale gas based on data collected by the Energy Information Administration agency of the United States Department of Energy. Numbers for the estimated amount of recoverable shale gas resources are provided alongside numbers for proven natural gas reserves.

From the list, China has the most recoverable shale gas.

== Table ==
* indicates "Natural resources in COUNTRY or TERRITORY" links.

Estimated recoverable reserves
Country	Region	Wet shale gas (trillion cubic feet)	Tight oil (billion barrels)	Year
World	–	7,576.6	418.9	–
China	Asia	1,115.2	32.2	2013
Argentina	South America	801.5	27.0	2013
Algeria	North Africa	706.9	5.7	2013
United States	North America	622.5	78.2	2015
Canada	North America	572.9	8.8	2013
Mexico	North America	545.2	13.1	2013
Australia	Australia	429.3	15.6	2013
South Africa	Sub-Saharan Africa	389.7	0.0	2013
Russia	Eastern Europe	284.5	74.6	2013
Brazil	South America	244.9	5.3	2013
United Arab Emirates	Middle East	205.3	22.6	2014
Venezuela	South America	167.3	13.4	2013
Poland	Eastern Europe	145.8	1.8	2013
France	Western Europe	136.7	4.7	2013
Ukraine	Eastern Europe	127.9	1.1	2013
Libya	North Africa	121.6	26.1	2013
Pakistan	Asia	105.2	9.1	2013
Egypt	North Africa	100.0	4.6	2013
India *	Asia	96.4	3.8	2013
Paraguay	South America	75.3	3.7	2013
Colombia	South America	54.7	6.8	2013
Romania	Eastern Europe	50.7	0.3	2013
Chile	South America	48.5	2.3	2014
Oman	Middle East	48.3	6.2	2014
Indonesia	Asia	46.4	7.9	2013
Chad	Sub-Saharan Africa	44.4	16.2	2013
Bolivia	South America	36.4	0.6	2013
Denmark	Western Europe	31.7	0.0	2013
Kazakhstan	Caspian	27.5	10.6	2014
Netherlands	Western Europe	25.9	2.9	2013
United Kingdom	Western Europe	25.8	0.7	2013
Turkey	Eastern Europe	23.6	4.7	2013
Tunisia	North Africa	22.7	1.5	2013
Germany	Western Europe	17.0	0.7	2013
Bulgaria	Eastern Europe	16.6	0.2	2013
Morocco	North Africa	11.9	0.0	2013
Sweden	Western Europe	9.8	0.0	2013
West Sahara	North Africa	8.6	0.2	2013
Spain	Western Europe	8.4	0.1	2013
Jordan	Middle East	6.8	0.1	2013
Thailand	Asia	5.4	0.0	2013
Uruguay	South America	4.6	0.6	2013
Mongolia	Asia	4.4	3.4	2013
Lithuania	Eastern Europe	2.4	1.4	2013
Mauritania	North Africa	0.0	0.0	2013
Norway	Western Europe	0.0	0.0	2013

== See also ==
- Shale gas by country
- Fracking by country
