= Attila Cseke =

Romanian lawyer and politician (born 1973)

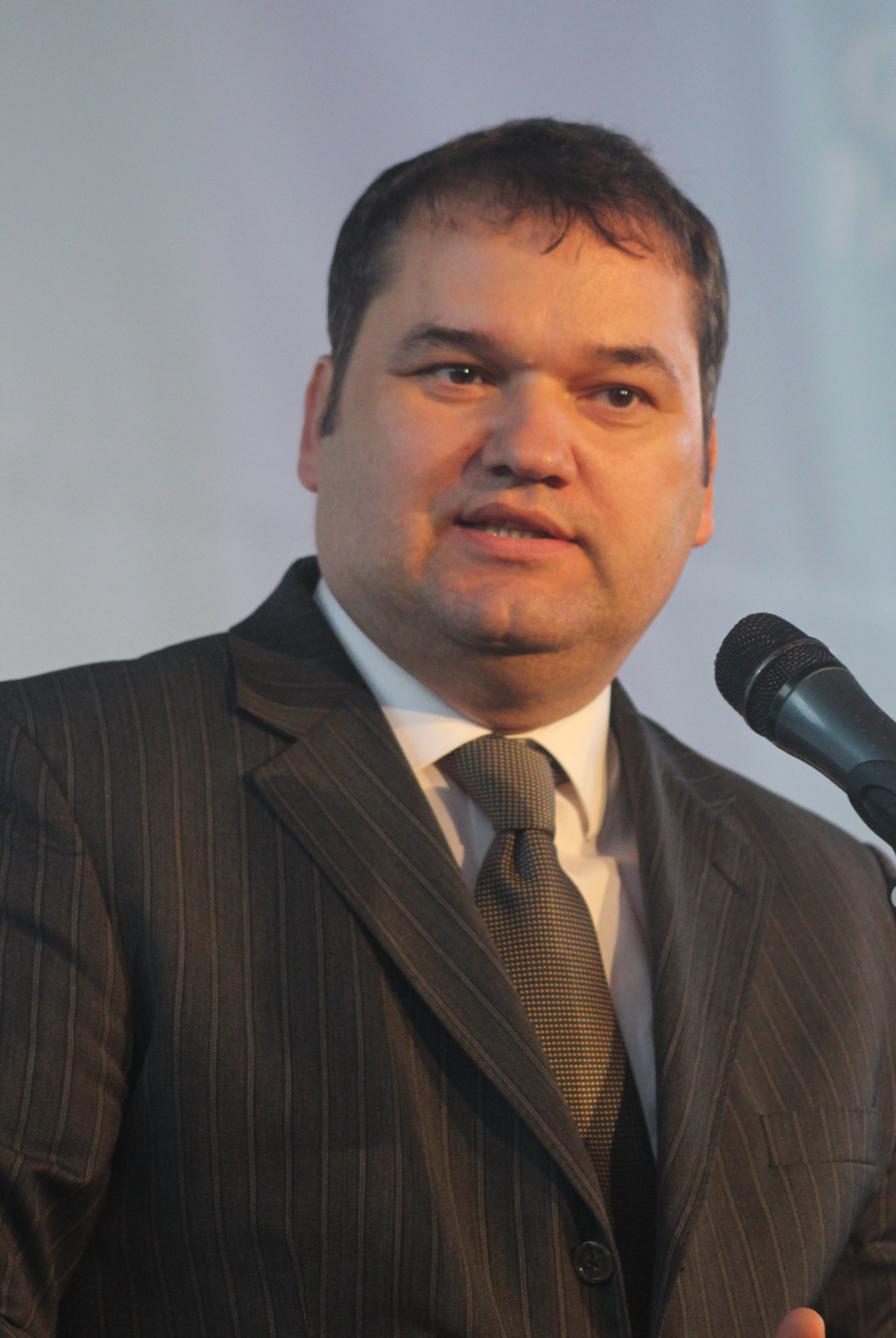
- Cseke in 2017

Minister of Development, Public Works and Administration
- In office 23 December 2024 – 20 October 2026
- Prime Minister: Marcel Ciolacu; Cătălin Predoiu (acting); Ilie Bolojan
- Preceded by: Adrian Veștea
- Succeeded by: Alexandru Stoica
- In office 23 December 2020 – 15 June 2023
- Prime Minister: Florin Cîțu; Nicolae Ciucă
- Preceded by: Ion Ștefan
- Succeeded by: Adrian Veștea

Minister of Health
- In office 23 December 2009 – 17 August 2011
- Prime Minister: Emil Boc
- Preceded by: Adriean Videanu (Note: As Acting Minister of Health.)
- Succeeded by: Ladislau Ritli

Member of the Senate
- Incumbent
- Assumed office 11 December 2016
- Constituency: Bihor County
- In office 30 November 2008 – 18 December 2012
- Constituency: Bihor County

Member of the Chamber of Deputies
- In office 18 December 2012 – 11 December 2016
- Constituency: Bihor County

Personal details
- Born: 9 June 1973 (age 53) Marghita, Bihor County, Romania
- Party: Democratic Alliance of Hungarians in Romania
- Spouse: Ina Fuiorea (m. 2015)
- Children: 1
- Education: Marghita Industrial High School
- Alma mater: University of Oradea
- Occupation: Lawyer; politician

Attila-Zoltán Cseke (born 9 June 1973) is a Romanian lawyer and politician. A member of the Democratic Alliance of Hungarians in Romania (UDMR), he was a member of the Romanian Senate for Bihor County from 2008 to 2012, representing the same county in the Chamber of Deputies from 2012 to 2016 before returning to the Senate. In the Emil Boc cabinet, he was Minister of Health from December 2009 until his resignation in August 2011. From December 2020 to June 2023, he was Minister of Development, Public Works and Administration under Prime Ministers Florin Cîțu and Nicolae Ciucă.

== Biography ==
He was born to ethnic Hungarian parents in Marghita and in 1991 completed secondary studies at the city's Industrial High School. From that year until 1993, he was an administrator at a food company in his native town. From 1996 to 2000, he attended the Juridical and Administrative Sciences Faculty of the University of Oradea, specialising in Law. He also completed postgraduate studies in Public Law there in 2002, and received a master's degree in Private Law from the same institution in 2004. In 2001, Cseke interned at a notary public office in Marghita; from that year until the following, he worked as a reviewer at the UDMR's Bihor County chapter. From 2002 to 2005, he was a legal adviser to the President of the Bihor County Council.

Cseke's political involvement began in 1997, when he joined the UDMR. From 2002 to 2003, he was president of its Bihor County chapter's commission for supervising regulations. In 2003, he became a member of the party's Union Representatives’ Council. From 2003 to 2005, he was executive vice president of the Bihor County UDMR, as well as a member of its county operative council. Following the 2004 local election, he joined the Oradea City Council, where he was secretary of the legal committee. He resigned in January 2005 to become Secretary of State at the Romanian Government's Secretariat General, serving there until December 2008. From 2007 to 2009, he was executive vice president of the UDMR, dealing with local public administration matters.

Cseke was elected to the Senate in 2008. From that time until early 2010, he served on two committees: rules; and justice, appointments, discipline, immunities and confirmations. From that point, he was on the defence, public order and national security committee. In December 2009, when four ministerial portfolios were assigned to the UDMR in a cabinet led by the Democratic Liberal Party's Emil Boc, Cseke's party assigned him to the Health Ministry. The following month, he proposed a tax on fatty, salty and sugary foods, with the revenue to be used in the public health sector. He has called for reforms in Romania's health care system, including a focus on allowing family physicians to practice medicine rather than become entangled in bureaucracy, saying it risks total paralysis otherwise. He also cautioned that cuts in investment and infrastructure would be necessary as a result of the 2008 financial crisis, but said that doctors and nurses, already too few in number, would not be laid off. He resigned in August 2011, citing insufficient allocation of funds for the health system and what he indicated was a dismissive attitude toward health care by the rest of the government. At the 2012 local election, he ran for mayor of Oradea, finishing second with 18.9% of the vote. That December, he was elected for a seat in the Chamber, where he was vice president of the public administration committee. At the 2016 election, he returned to the Senate, becoming leader of the UDMR delegation there. Continuing as such in 2020, he was also named Minister of Development, Public Works and Administration in the government of Florin Cîțu that December.

From 1997 to 2000, Cseke was a member of the Hungarian Students' Union in Bihor County. From 1998 to 2000, he was part of the Oradea chapter of the European Law Students' Association Romania. In 2001, he joined the Oradea branch of the Association of Hungarian Doctoral Students and Young Researchers from Romania. In 2003, he became part of the consultative committee of the Biharia Euroregion. From 2004 to 2006, he was an alternate member of the Joint Monitoring Committee of the Romania-Hungary Cross-Border Cooperation Programme. From 2004 to 2009, he was president of the Coordinating Council on Bihor County Hungarian Youth.

In 2015, he married Ina Fuiorea, an ethnic Romanian from Râmnicu Vâlcea. The couple had a son after the civil ceremony. Later in the year, they held a religious wedding at a Reformed church in Tileagd, Bihor County.

== Notes ==
Political offices
Preceded by Adriean Videanu; Acting	Minister of Health; 2009–2011	Succeeded by Ladislau Ritli
Preceded by Ion Ștefan	Minister of Development, Public Works and Administration; 2020–present	Incumbent
