= Cristian Adomniței =

Romanian engineer and politician

Cristian Mihai Adomniței (Romanian pronunciation: [kristiˈan adomˈnit͡sej]; born April 24, 1975) is a Romanian engineer and politician. A member of the National Liberal Party (PNL), he has been a member of the Romanian Chamber of Deputies for Iași County since 2004. In the Călin Popescu-Tăriceanu cabinet, he served as Minister of Education from 2007 to 2008.

== Biography ==
Born in Suceava, in 1999 he earned a degree in civil, industrial and agricultural engineering from the Gheorghe Asachi Technical University of Iași (UTI), and one in railway, road and bridge engineering from there in 2004. That year, he received a master's degree in construction from UTI, beginning a doctorate there in the same field in 2005. A member of UTI's student senate in 1998–1999, he voted to transform the student cafeteria into Iulius Mall Iași, a project which he later coordinated. Between 1999 and 2004, he held management and consulting positions at four different construction firms in Iași.

In 1994, Adomniței joined the PNL; within the party, he has been head of the National Liberal Youth (2005–2009) and head of the PNL's Iași chapter (2009-). His first elective office came in 2004, when he joined the Iași County Council. Later that year, he left his seat on the council when he was elected to the Chamber. There, he has served on various committees: public administration, land management and ecological balance (2007–2008); education, science, youth and sport (2004–2007); European affairs (2004–2007); European integration (2004–2006); industries and services (2008-); relations with UNESCO (2010-). Additionally, he was Education Minister under Tăriceanu from April 2007 to October 2008. The first Education Minister since the 1989 Revolution not to have been a professor or researcher, he owed his rise through the PNL and to the position to his mentor, the businessman and politician Relu Fenechiu, with whom he collaborated at several firms. A month after becoming minister, he was involved in a gaffe during a visit to a Brăila school, where he insisted before a group of 5th graders, their protests notwithstanding, that the flag of Europe has 15 stars and not 12. He later said this was due to notes provided by his advisers, whom he promised to chastise. At the June 2008 local election, he ran for Mayor of Iași, coming in third with 9.8% of the vote. At the June 2012 local election, he ran for president of the Iași County Council, winning with 61.6% of the vote.

In October 2008, Adomniței married Sabina Vișinari. For the civil marriage, because a cabinet meeting had run late and his bride was waiting at Iași City Hall, he was taken from Bucharest to the Iași area on an Interior Ministry helicopter flight that included his colleague, Cristian David, who was on an unplanned work visit to Albița. The religious marriage took place the same month in a Romanian Orthodox ceremony at Sucevița Monastery. In the meantime, Tăriceanu had dismissed Adomniței, officially because of the latter's failure to monitor debates and express the government's negative viewpoint in parliamentary committees that led to the adoption of a law raising teacher salaries. He also deemed the helicopter incident "unacceptable" and mentioned that there was an accumulated series of matters that led to the dismissal, which was welcomed by the teachers' unions with whom Adomniţei had been embroiled in conflict.
