= Cristian David (politician) =

Romanian politician (born 1967)

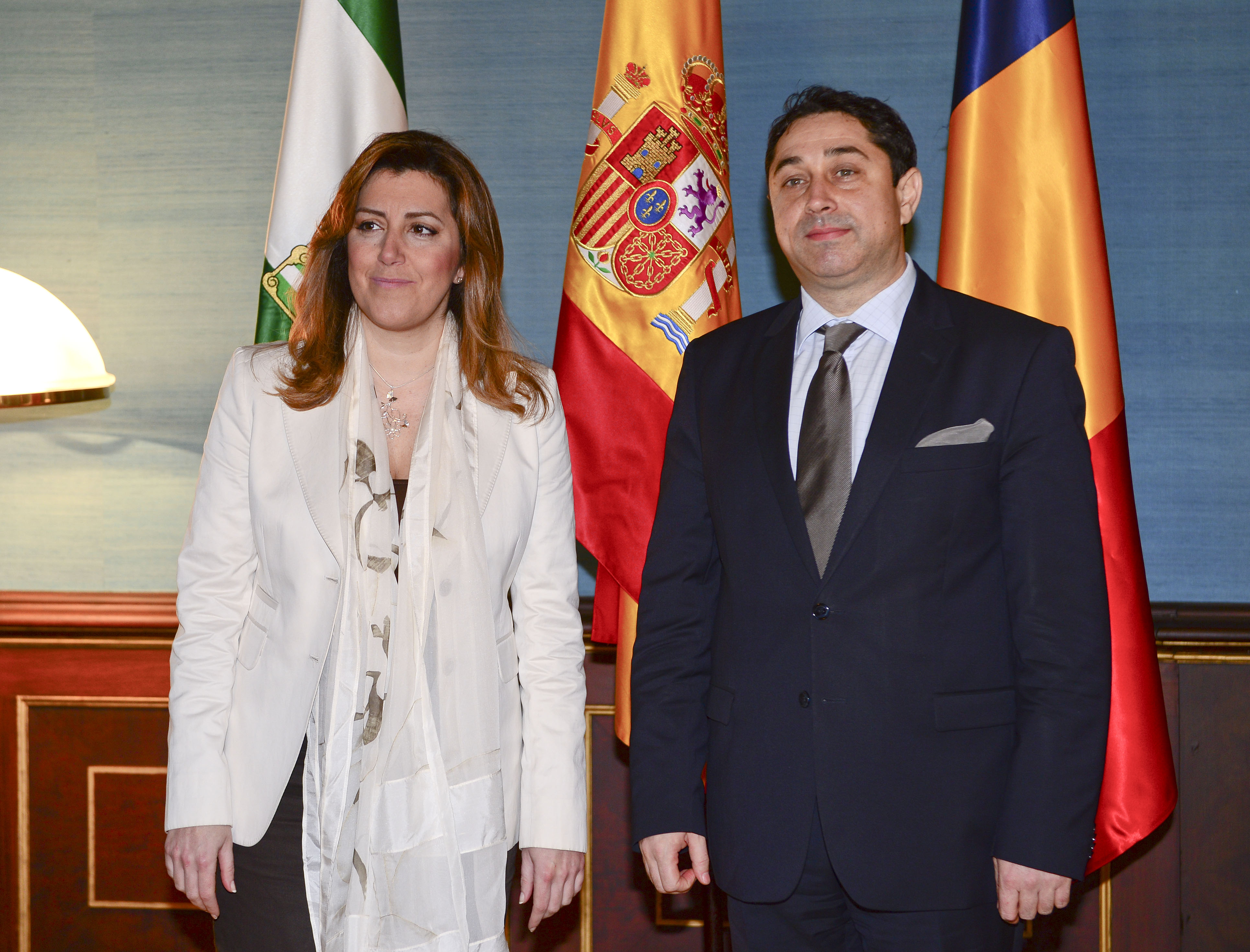
- Cristian David in 2014
- Born: Cristian Troacă; December 26, 1967; Bucharest
- Occupation: Politician

Cristian David (born Cristian Troacă; December 26, 1967) is a Romanian politician. A member of the National Liberal Party (PNL), he has been a member of the Romanian Senate for Vaslui County since 2004. In the Călin Popescu-Tăriceanu cabinet, he was Minister-Delegate for International Financing Programs and European Community Acquis from 2004 to 2007 and Minister of Interior and Administrative Reform from 2007 to 2008.

== Biography ==
He was born in Bucharest, and worked at a chemical equipment factory there from 1986 to 1991, rising to design engineer in 1990. Between 1992 and 2004, he held management positions at three different firms involved in import/export and consulting. He paused his business activity from 1997 to 1998, when he was an adviser to the Youth and Sport Minister, the future PNL President Crin Antonescu. In 1997 he graduated from the Faculty of Statistics, Cybernetics, and Computer Science of the Bucharest Academy of Economic Studies, earning a doctorate in economics there in 2006. He was assistant professor in the Statistics and Economic Forecasting Department there from 2001 to 2004.

Entering politics after the fall of the Communist regime, he was coordinator of the University National Liberal Youth (TNL) from 1990 to 1993, rising to secretary general from 1993 to 1997. He belonged to the PNL's permanent central bureau in 1991-1993 and 2005–2006, and headed its foreign affairs department from 1997 to 2005. He was on the delegation of PNL national representatives in 2002–2004, and from 2003 to 2004 was on the electoral committee of the European Liberal Democrat and Reform Party, in advance of the 2004 European Parliament election. During his first term in the Senate (2004-2008), he sat on the human rights, religious affairs and national minorities committee. In his second term (2008-), he is on the joint committee providing oversight to the activities of Serviciul Român de Informaţii. Additionally, David held two positions in the Tăriceanu cabinet: Minister-Delegate for International Financing Programs and European Community Acquis from December 2004 to April 2007, when the post was disbanded, and Interior Minister from then until the cabinet left office in December 2008.

David's first marriage took place in 2001, at which time he adopted his wife's surname, and ended in divorce. His second marriage took place quietly in November 2005 in Vienna, with a Romanian Orthodox ceremony following six months later. His second wife is Vanda Vlasov, daughter of the Iaşi lawyer Mihail Vlasov. Already an ally of the businessman and politician Relu Fenechiu, David consolidated his relationship with Fenechiu through the marriage due to the latter's connections with Mihail Vlasov. Later, while Minister-Delegate, David was accused of taking no action when allegations surfaced that Vlasov embezzled €211,000 in European Union funds. Two scandals hit David near the end of his ministerial service. In October 2008, it emerged that the Romanian Police, a part of his ministry, had signed contracts to purchase Dacia Logans for some €70,000 each, with the opposition PDL calling for his resignation and asserting that the police bought the cars for €12,000 under his PDL predecessor. David refused to resign, instead firing police chief Gheorghe Popa. The following month, Pavel Abraham, a former chief of the Romanian Police, alleged that in 1995, police officers searching David's home discovered LSD, amphetamine, and cocaine. In reply, David stated that the residence was his girlfriend's and was being rented to his Dutch business partner, and that he was questioned as a witness in the case.
