= Constantin Niță =

Romanian economist and politician

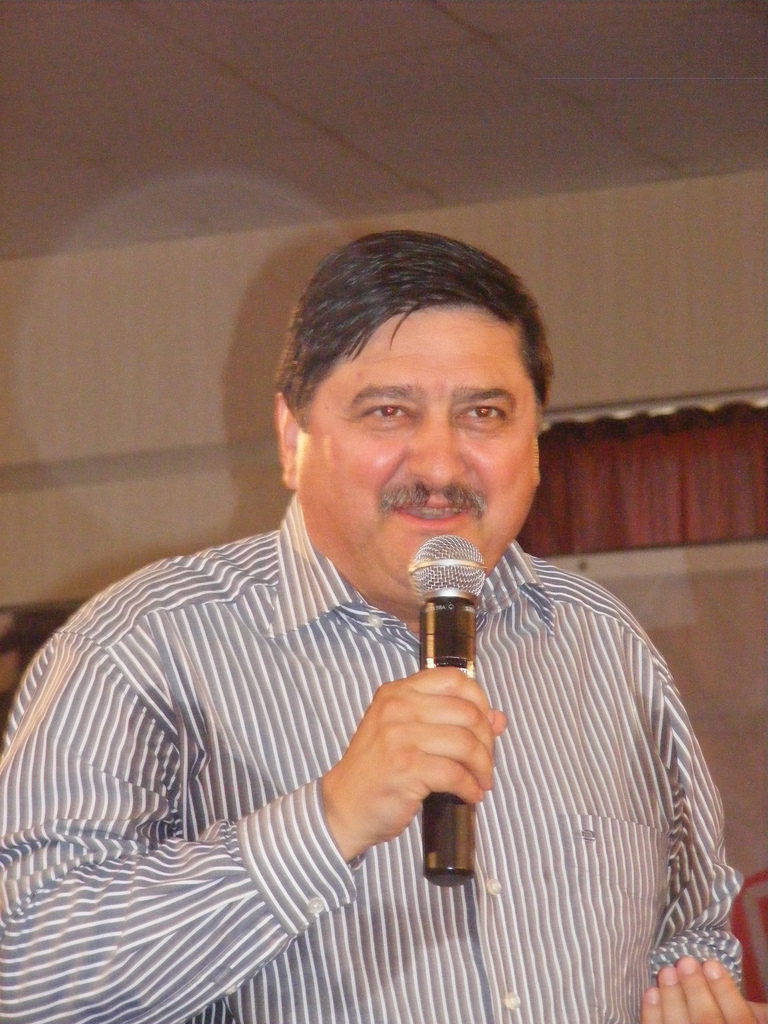
Niță speaking to a Social Democratic Youth audience in Otopeni, September 2009

Constantin Niță (born November 27, 1955) is a Romanian economist and politician. A member of the Social Democratic Party (PSD), he has been a member of the Romanian Chamber of Deputies for Brașov County since 2000. In the Emil Boc cabinet, he was Minister of Small and Medium Enterprises, Commerce and Business Environment from 2008 to 2009.

He is married and has one child.

== Biography ==
He was born in Miroslovești, Iași County, attended primary school there, and completed secondary studies at Theoretical High School no. 1 in Pașcani in 1973. Following army service (1973–1974), he studied Industrial Economics at the University of Iași, graduating in 1978. From that year until 1983 he studied law at the same institution. He took a post-graduate course in foreign trade from 1983 to 1984, and from 1995 to 1999 worked on a doctorate at Iași, earning one in Marketing. He has taken additional courses in Lugoj and Bucharest, and from 1998 to 2001 taught at the Transylvania University of Brașov; since 2001, he has taught marketing at the George Barițiu University of Brașov. Niță has co-written five books on marketing and tourism, written one, and published over 50 articles in specialty magazines. His first job was as an economist from 1978 to 1983; he headed the export division at a truck factory in Brașov. From 1983 to 1986 he was also an economist at a motor vehicle import-export firm in Brașov, and from 1986 to 1993 headed a travel agency in that city. From 1990 to 1993 he was director of the Pîrîul Rece resort there, and from 1993 to 1997 he led an agency coordinating protocol visits to the Prahova Valley. From 1997 to 2000 he directed another Brașov travel agency. He belongs to a number of civic associations in his adopted city.

From 1994 to 1997, Niță was vice president of the Brașov organisation of the PDSR, predecessor to the PSD. In 1997, he became head of the Brașov County PSD chapter and joined the party's national council. He also sat on the party's executive bureau from 1998 to 2004, and was elected one of its vice presidents in 2010. He was elected to the Chamber of Deputies in 2000, 2004 and 2008. In the Chamber, he was secretary on the permanent bureau in 2000-2003 and vice president in 2003–2004; among his assignments was as vice president of the joint parliamentary committee providing oversight to the activities of Serviciul Român de Informații (2004–2007). He drew attention for claiming boarding expenses of 832 million lei (some $26,000) in 2002, equal to at least 492 days at a hotel. Also that year, his name appeared on recordings of telephone conversations held by Sicilian Mafia bosses, who referred to him as being linked to their representative in Romania; Niță categorically denied having links to the Mafia and sued former President Emil Constantinescu for making the transcripts public. He was named to the Boc cabinet in December 2008, delegating his Brașov party duties to others. As minister, Niță predicted that nearly 40% of Romania's small and medium-sized businesses could go bankrupt due to the 2008 financial crisis; his priorities included unfreezing credits for them, simplifying their paperwork for obtaining European Union grants and devoting 0.4% of GDP to helping them and creating jobs there, and restructuring his ministry. Together with his PSD colleagues, Niță resigned from the cabinet on October 1, 2009, in protest at the dismissal of vice prime minister and Interior Minister Dan Nica. In April 2016, Niță's term as Brașov County PSD president expired and he opted not to run again. At the same time, he quit his posts within the national party and announced he would not seek another term in the Chamber at the autumn election. In May 2017, Niță was sentenced to four years' imprisonment for influence peddling.
