= Alexandru Stoica (politician) =

Romanian politician (born 1990)

Minister of Development, Public Works and Administration
- Incumbent
- Assumed office 20 October 2026
- Prime Minister: Luca Niculescu
- Preceded by: Attila Cseke

Personal details
- Born: 6 February 1990 (age 36)
- Party: Social Democratic Party

Marcel-Alexandru Stoica (born 6 February 1990) is a Romanian politician serving as minister of development, public works and administration since 2026. From 2021 to 2026, he served as secretary of state of the Ministry of Development, Public Works and Administration.
