= Ministry of Regional Development and Public Administration =

Government ministry of Romania

Ministry for Development, Public Works and Administration
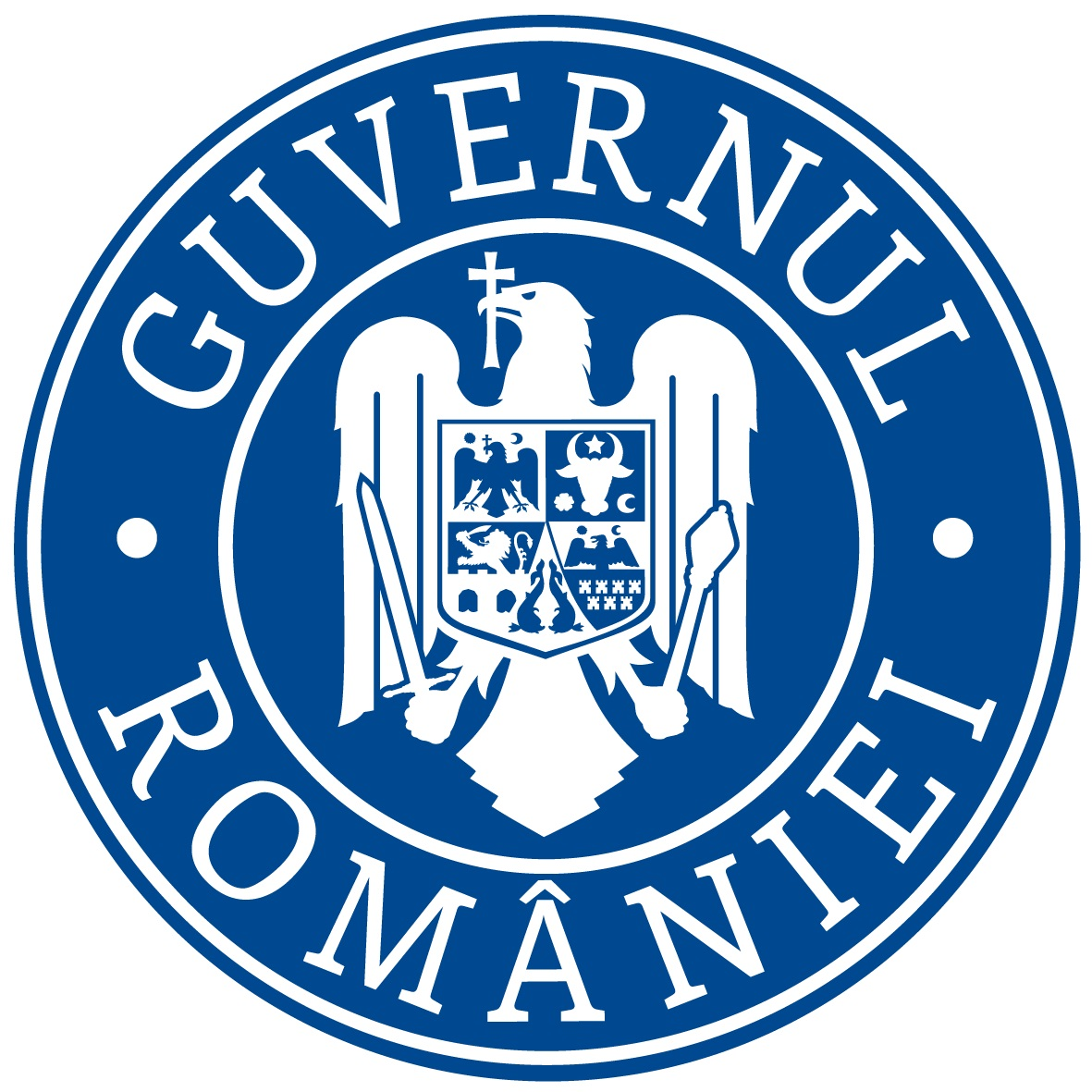
- Ministry for Development, Public Works and Administration's logo
- Incumbent; Alexandru Stoica since 20 October 2026
- Formation: Created in 2012
- Website: www.mdrap.ro

The Ministry for Development, Public Works and Administration of Romania (Romanian: Ministerul Dezvoltării, Lucrărilor Publice și Administrației) is an institution of the Romanian central public administration, subordinated to the Government of Romania. The Ministry was created on December 22, 2012, by the restructuring of the former Ministry of Regional Development and Tourism (2009–2010) and by taking over the public administration structures and the institutions specialized in this area from the Ministry of Interior Affairs, under the Emergency Ordinance no.96 of 22 December 2012.

== Ministers ==
Since 20 October 2026, the Minister for Development, Public Works and Administration has been Alexandru Stoica.

== Overview ==
The Ministry for Development, Public Works and Administration carries out government policies in the fields of regional development, territorial development and cohesion, cross-border, transnational and interregional cooperation, spatial planning, urban planning and architecture, housing, real estate and urban planning management and development, public works and construction. In these areas, the Ministry manages several programmes financed from European and national funds: The Regional Operational Programme 2007-2013 and 2014–2020, 12 European territorial cooperation programmes for 2014–2020, European territorial cooperation programmes for 2007–2013, PHARE - Economic and Social Cohesion, programmes for territorial development, housing construction, thermal rehabilitation of housing blocks, retrofitting of earthquake prone buildings, construction of sports halls and cultural homes.
