= Government of Romania =

National government

- Guvernul României

Overview
- Established: 1862; 164 years ago
- State: Romania
- Leader: Prime Minister
- Appointed by: President
- Responsible to: Parliament of Romania
- Headquarters: Victoria Palace; Bucharest
- Website: gov.ro/en

The Government of Romania (Romanian: Guvernul României) forms one half of the executive branch of the government of Romania (the other half being the office of the President of Romania). It is headed by the Prime Minister of Romania, and consists of the ministries, various subordinate institutions and agencies, and the 42 prefectures. The seat of the Romanian Government is at Victoria Palace in Bucharest.

The Government is the public authority of executive power that functions on the basis of the vote of confidence granted by Parliament, ensuring the achievement of the country's domestic and foreign policy and that exercises the general leadership of public administration. The Government is appointed by the President of Romania on the basis of the vote of confidence granted to the Government by the Parliament of Romania.

== Overview ==
=== Current government ===
On 5 October 2026, diplomat Luca Niculescu was nominated for the position of Prime Minister by current President Nicușor Dan. He and his cabinet were approved by the Chamber of Deputies on 20 October.

=== Investiture ===
The procedure of investing a new Government is initiated by the President, who designates a candidate to the office of Prime Minister after consulting the party which holds a majority of seats in the Parliament. If no such majority exists, the President consults all the parties represented in Parliament. Once nominated, the candidate establishes a list of members and a government platform; this is to be done in 10 days. The 10-day interval is not a strict deadline, rather it represents the time period deemed optimal to establish a competent legal Government. The expiry of this interval allows the President to revoke the candidate and designate a new one, though this is not mandatory.

Once the candidate has formed a list and a program, they can ask for the Parliament's vote of confidence. The Parliament debates upon the matter in joint sitting, and can only reject proposals twice in a span of 60 days. If Parliament fails to approve a candidate within this time period, the President gains the right to dissolve it then.

Should the Parliament grant its vote of confidence, the proposed political platform becomes official, and the full list of Government must be confirmed by the President. The Government is then sworn in and begins its term.

=== Government program ===
The Government is organized and functions in accordance with the Constitution, based on Government Program approved by Parliament. The Government Program is a political-administrative document that sets out the principles, guidelines and steps needed to be taken that the Government intends to implement during its term in office in all the fields of activity. To achieve the goals stipulated in the Government Program, the Romanian Government performs the functions of strategizing, regulating, administering, representing and exercising the state authority.

=== Strategies, policies and programs ===
The Government approves the strategies, policies and public administration programs, these being methods of accomplishing the goals stipulated in the Government Program, as well as methods of satisfying the competences of the institution as a public authority within the executive power, its role being that of ensuring the balanced functioning and development of the national economic and social system, along with its connection to the global economic system while promoting the national interests of Romania.

=== Role ===
The role of the Government is sanctioned by the Constitution and by relevant laws. The Government exercises "general leadership of the public administration", elaborates strategies to implement the government platform, exercises legislative initiative, negotiates international treaties, represents the Romanian state both internally and externally, names prefects and presents information and documents to the Chambers of Parliament as requested.

=== Relations with the Parliament ===
The Government answers exclusively to Parliament, both through compulsory information of Parliament and through questions, interpellations and inquiry committees. A Chamber of Parliament (Chamber of Deputies or Senate) may carry a simple motion with regards to the subject matter of an interpellation. In extreme cases, the Parliament may vote a motion of censure, withdrawing its confidence and forcing the Government to resign.

Through a special habilitation law, the Government may be enabled to issue ordinances (ordonanțe), which have the same legal force as ordinary laws. Ordinances are a form of legislative delegation, and may require approval in Parliament if the habilitation law states so. In extraordinary situations, in which regulation cannot be postponed, the Government may issue emergency ordinances (ordonanțe de urgență), which do not require habilitation laws but must be subjected to approval in Parliament before coming into force.

== Structure ==
Victoria Palace in Victory Square, Bucharest, is the seat of the Romanian government.

The Constitution of Romania provides for two basic types of members, namely ministers (miniștri) and the Prime Minister (prim-ministrul). The statute of additional members is established by organic law. Current legislation establishes the positions of deputy prime minister (viceprim-ministru), state minister (ministru de stat) and ministers delegated with special tasks (miniștri delegați cu însărcinări speciale). "State minister" is a senior position, the holder of which coordinates the activity of various ministries under the direction of the Prime Minister.

The Prime Minister is the leader of Government and coordinates its activity. The working apparatus of the Government consists of the Prime-Minister's office, the General Secretariat of the Government and other departments and structures established through Government Decisions.

The Prime Minister's office itself consists of the Prime Minister's Cabinet, the body of his state-secretaries and state-counselors, and the Prime Minister's Registry.

=== Governmental working apparatus ===
==== Chancellery of the Prime Minister ====
A structure without legal personality, subordinated directly to the Prime Minister, funded through the budget of the Secretariat - General of the Government, led by the Head of Chancellery, with the rank of Minister, appointed and removed from office by Prime Minister's decision, one or more Secretaries of state and State Advisors, appointed, or removed from office by Prime Minister's decision, perform their activity in the Prime Minister Chancellery;

==== General Secretariat of the Government ====
The Secretariat is a public institution with legal personality, subordinated to the Prime Minister, headed by a general secretary with the rank of Minister, assisted by a Deputy Secretary-General with the rank of Secretary of State, and, where appropriate, by one or more many Secretaries of State, appointed, or removed from office by Prime Minister's Decision, the Secretary-General of the Government is the main credit authorizing officer for the apparatus of Government and public institutions and bodies of the central public administration, subordinated or coordinated by the Government, the Prime Minister and the Secretariat-General of the Government

==== Department for Liaison with Parliament ====
A structure with legal personality, funded through the budget of the General Secretariat of the Government, headed by the Minister for Liaison with Parliament, who has the capacity as tertiary credit authorizing officer. The department comprises one or more Secretaries of State, appointed and removed from office by Prime Minister's decision.

==== Department for Infrastructure Projects and Foreign Investment ====
A structure with legal personality, funded through the budget of the General Secretariat of the Government, headed by the Minister for Infrastructure Projects of National Interest and Foreign Investment, who has the capacity as secondary credit authorizing officer. The department comprises one or more Secretaries of State, appointed and removed from office by Prime Minister's decision.

==== Department for Combating Fraud - DLAF ====
A structure with legal personality, in the apparatus of the Government, under the Prime Minister's coordination, financed from the state budget through the budget of the General Secretariat of the Government, headed by a Chief with the rank of Secretary of State, appointed by Prime Minister's decision for a period of 5 years, tertiary credit authorizing officer; DLAF is the institution of contact with European Anti-fraud Office- OLAF and provides supports or coordinates, as appropriate, the fulfillment by Romania of its obligations with respect to the protection of the financial interests of the European Union, in accordance with Art. 325 of the Treaty on European Union, having the power to control the obtaining, unfolding or use of EU funds and related co-financing funds;

==== Control Body of the Prime Minister ====
A structure without legal personality, under the Prime Minister's authority, headed by a Secretary of State, appointed and removed from office by Prime Minister's Decision, and funded through the budget of the General Secretariat of the Government; it controls and monitors the activity of Ministries and their decentralized public services, public institutions under Government's authority, specialized bodies of the central public administration subordinated to the Government, offices, departments, commissions, autonomous companies, national companies and societies, trading companies and financial -banking institutions with state majority capital or entirely owned by state; Control Body of the Prime Minister controls the activity of public institutions subordinated to local public administration authorities, while observing the legal provisions on the general regime of local autonomy and the organization and functioning of local public administration authorities;

==== Department for Interethnic Relations ====
A structure without legal personality, subordinated to the Prime Minister and under the coordination of the General - Secretary of the Government, headed by a Secretary of State, assisted by two Secretaries of State, appointed, or removed from office by the Prime Minister's decision, and funded through the budget of the Secretariat -General of the Government.

==== Other departments ====
Organized as structures with or without legal personality, under Prime Minister's authority, headed by State Secretaries or others with similar rank, whose establishment and / or operation is approved by Government Decision.

=== Ministries ===
There are eighteen ministries in the Romanian government:

1. Ministry of Finance
2. Ministry of Internal Affairs
3. Ministry of Foreign Affairs
4. Ministry of Justice
5. Ministry of National Defence
6. Ministry of Economy, Entrepreneurship and Tourism
7. Ministry of Energy
8. Ministry of Transport and Infrastructure
9. Ministry of Agriculture and Rural Development
10. Ministry of Environment, Water and Forests
11. Ministry of Development, Public Works and Administration
12. Ministry of Investments and European Projects
13. Ministry of Labour and Social Solidarity
14. Ministry of Health
15. Ministry of Education
16. Ministry of Research, Innovation and Digitalization
17. Ministry of Culture
18. Ministry of Family, Youth and Equality of Opportunity

=== Prefectures ===
Prefectures

== Legislative process ==
The Government meetings are convened and are led by the prime minister.

The Government meets weekly or whenever necessary to debate domestic and foreign policy issues or aspects of general leadership of public administration.

The Government meeting's agenda includes:

- drafting legislative acts (drafting laws, ordinances and decisions)
- reports
- notes, mandate notes
- memoranda
- stances
- information and other documents, depending on the needs and requests.

The government agenda is divided into two parts and may also contain additional lists, with the approval of the Prime Minister.

The Government adopts decisions and ordinances (simple or emergency ordinances). Decisions are issued to organize the laws enforcement and ordinances are issued under a special enabling law, within the limits and conditions specified therein.

=== Decision-making circuit ===
The decision-making circuit of draft public policy documents and draft legislative acts is structured in two phases: a) preparatory meeting of the Government meeting which ensures the coordination of the process of elaboration, consultation and approval for public policy documents and legislative acts at inter-ministerial level; b) government meeting marking the end of decision-making process through the adoption / approval or rejection of such draft laws.

== See also ==
- List of Romanian governments
- List of institutions subordinated to the Government of Romania
