= 2021 in Romania =

- Decades: 2000s; 2010s; 2020s
- See also: Other events of 2021; History of Romania; Timeline of Romanian history; Years in Romania

Events from the year 2021 in Romania.

== Incumbents ==
President

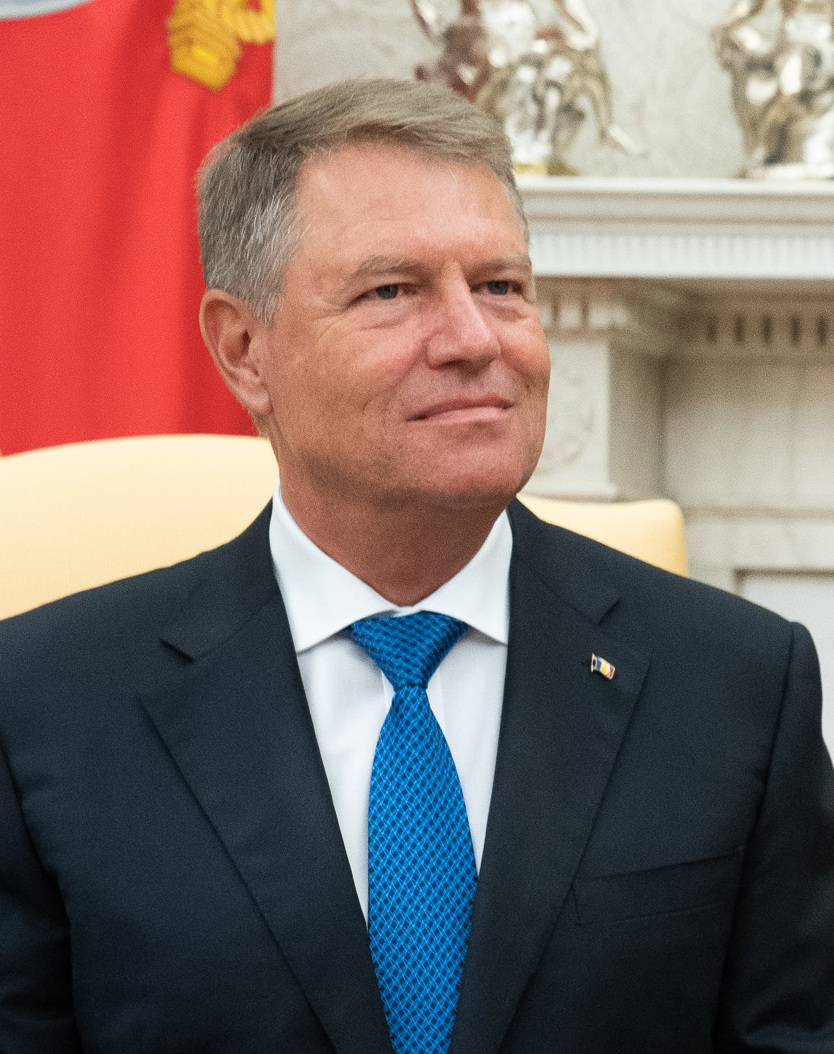
Klaus Iohannis

Prime Minister

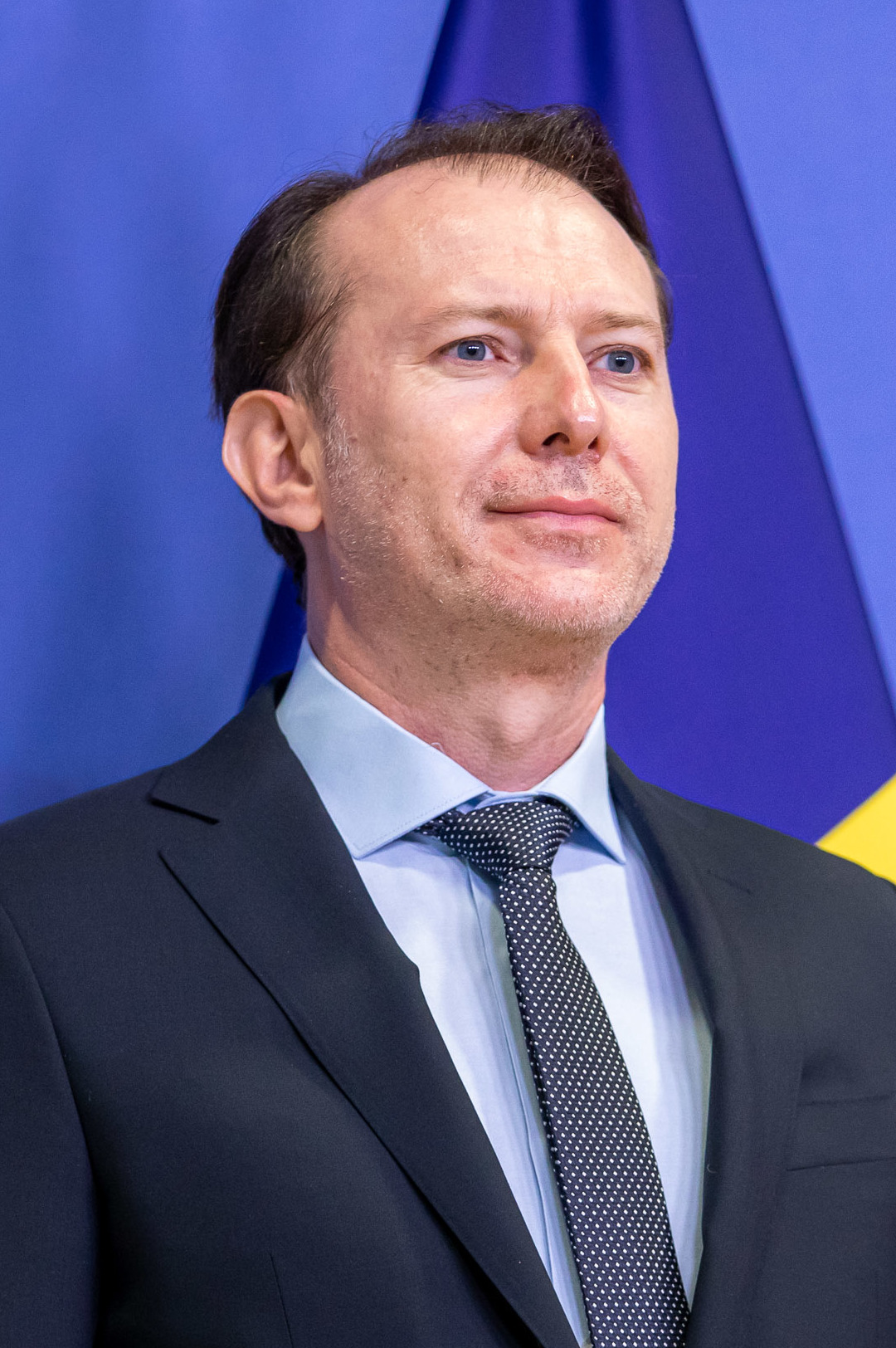
Florin Cîțu (until 25 November 2021)

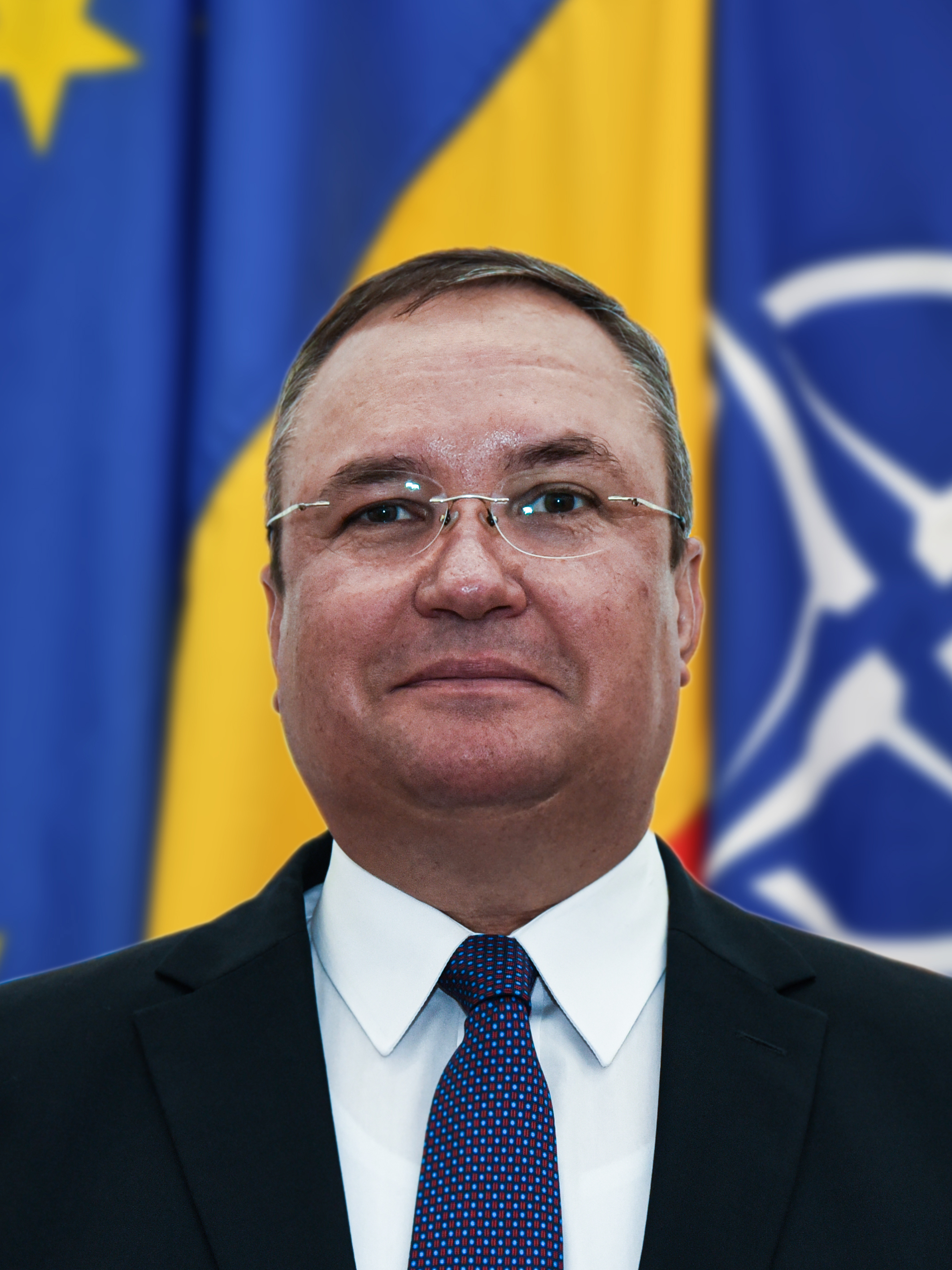
Nicolae Ciucă (since 25 November 2021)

Deputy Prime Ministers

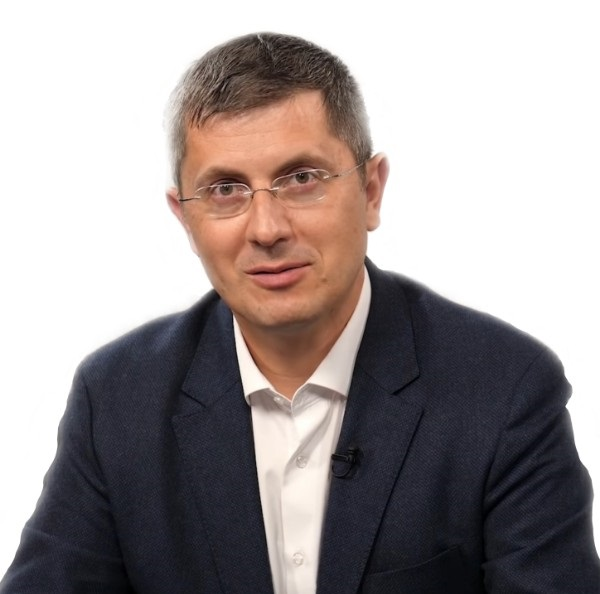
Dan Barna (until 8 September 2021)

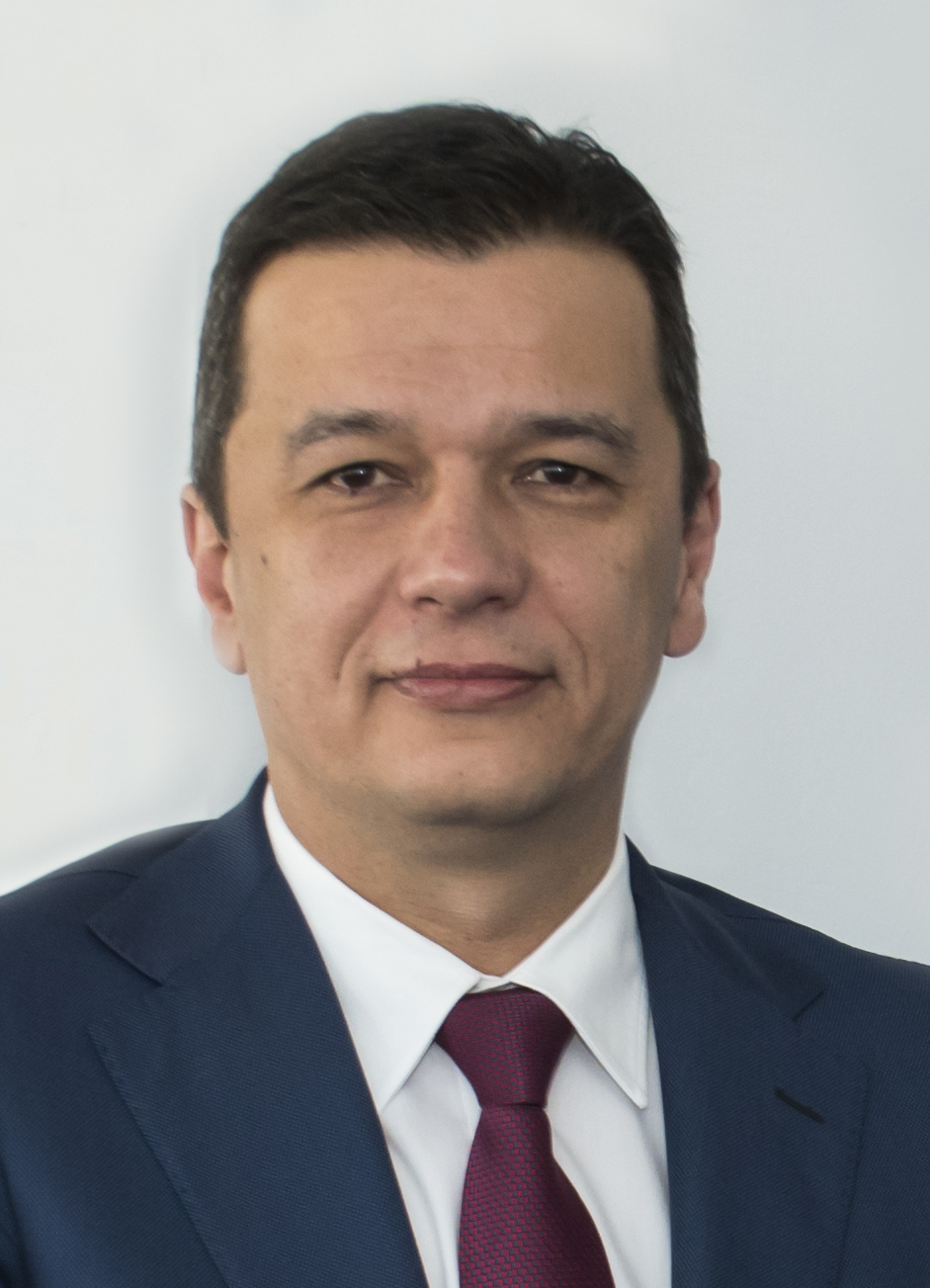
Sorin Grindeanu (since 25 November 2021)

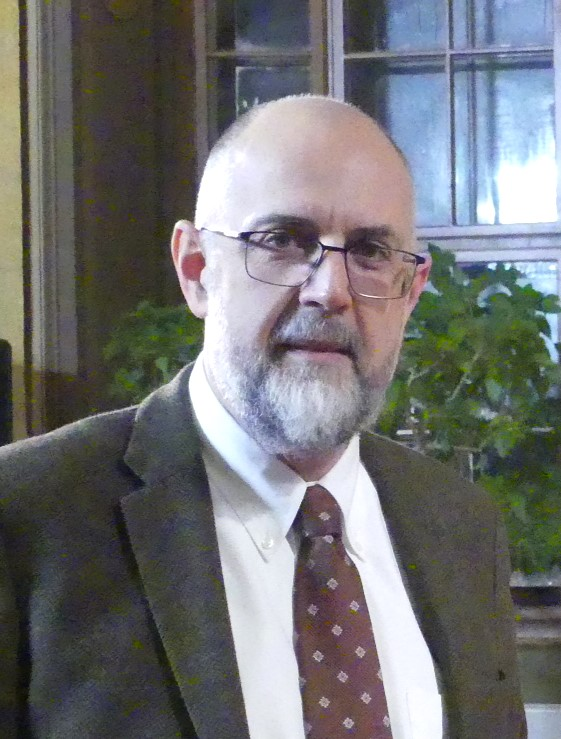
Hunor Kelemen

President of the Senate

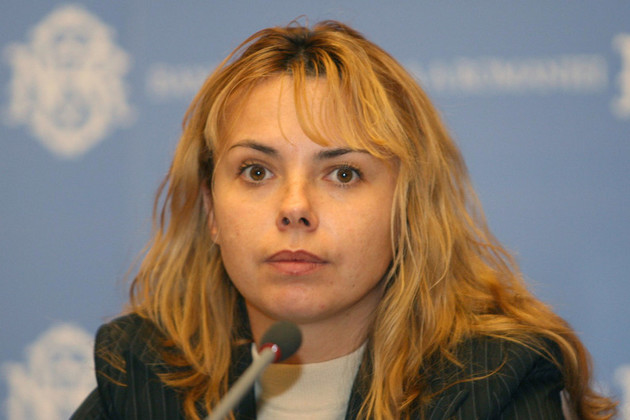
Anca Dragu (until 23 November 2021)

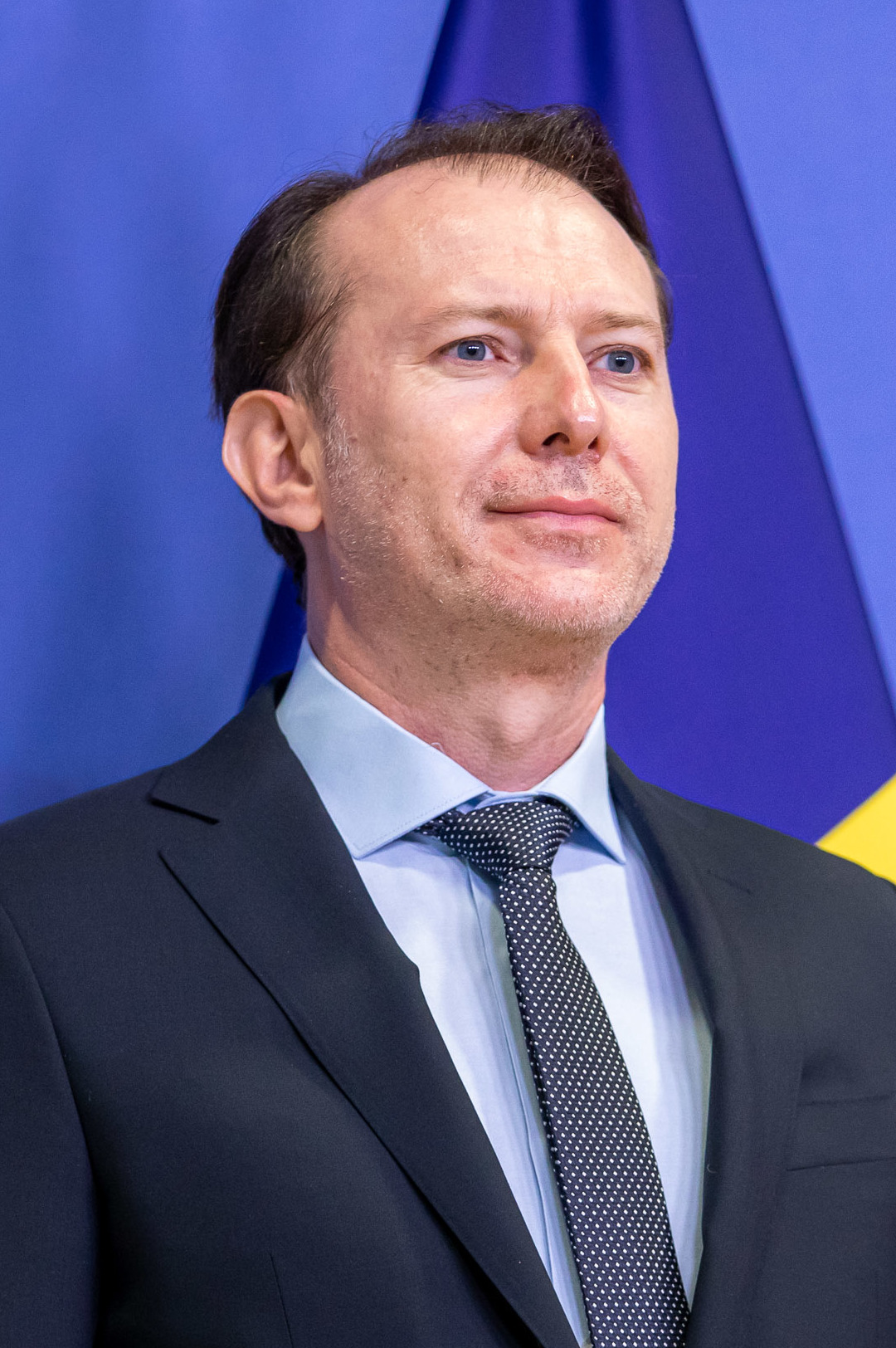
Florin Cîțu (since 23 November 2021)

President of the Chamber of Deputies

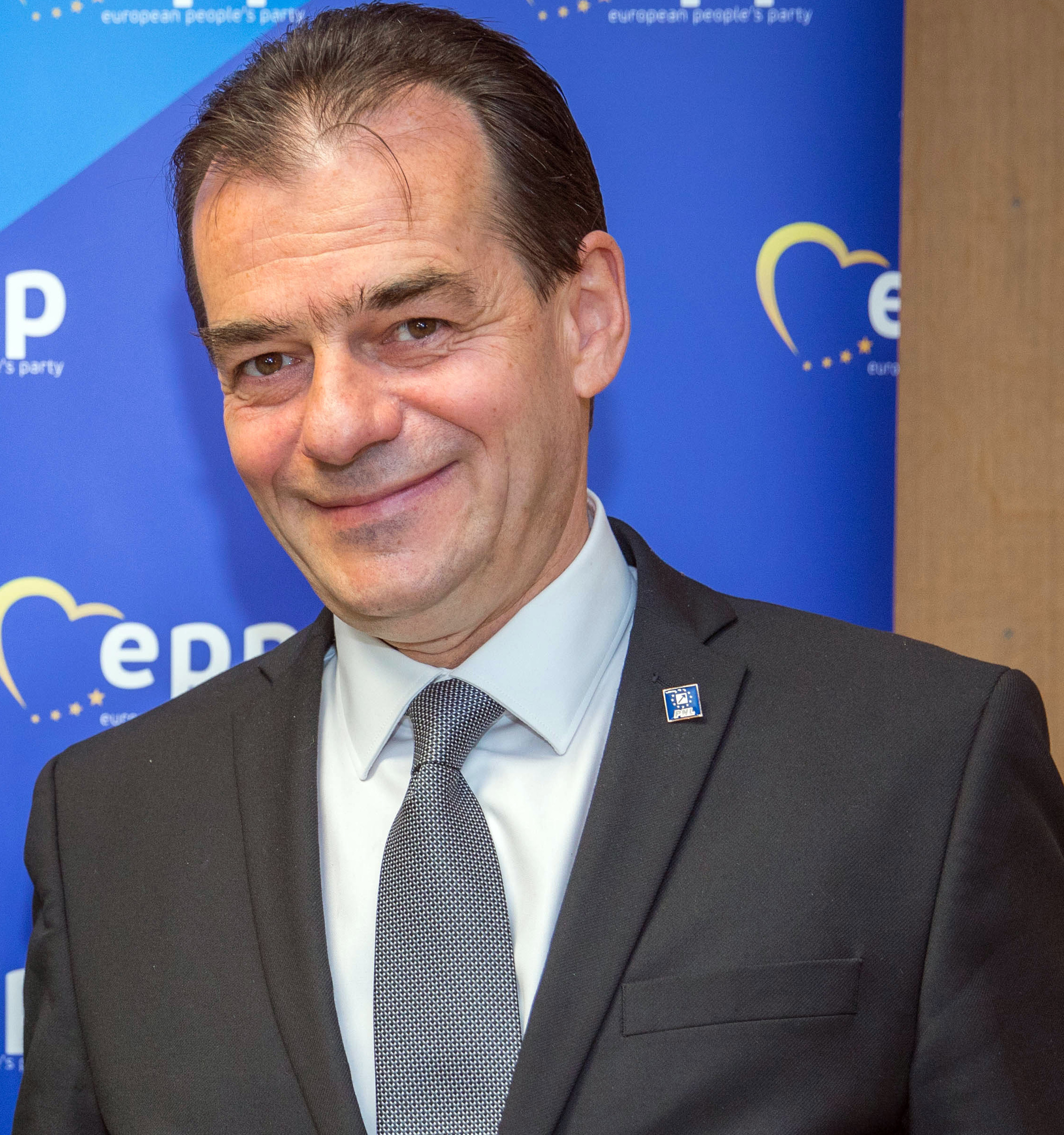
Ludovic Orban (until 18 October 2021)

Florin Roman (18 October 2021 – 2 November 2021) (acting)

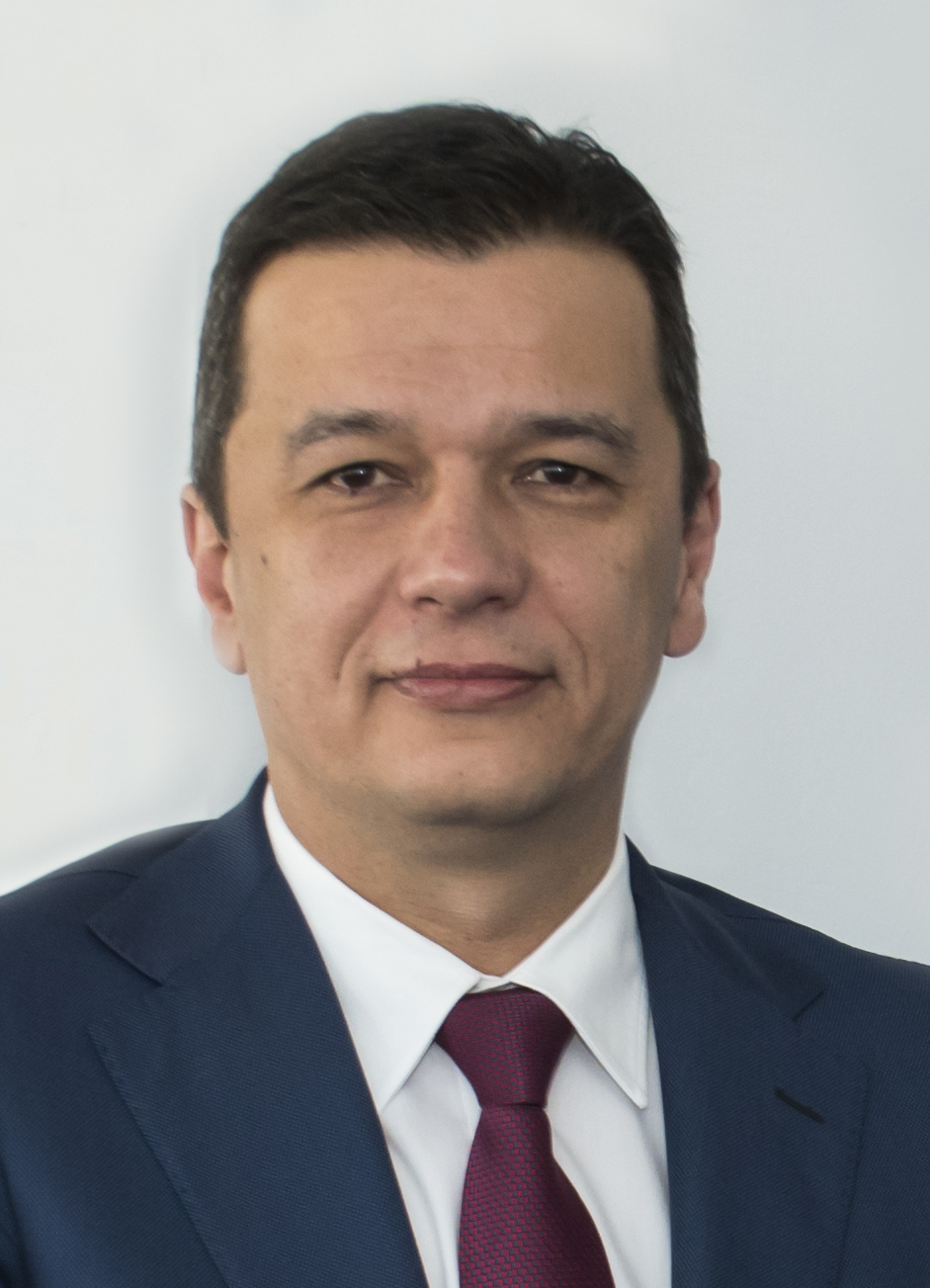
Sorin Grindeanu (2–23 November 2021) (acting)

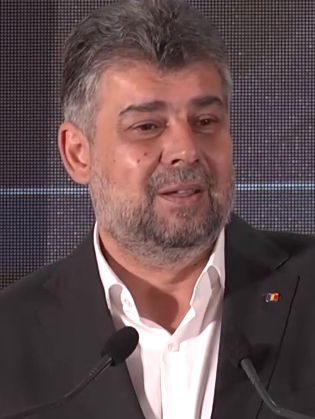
Marcel Ciolacu (since 23 November 2021)

President of the High Court of Cassation and Justice

- Corina Corbu

President of the Constitutional Court

- Valer Dorneanu

== Events ==
Ongoing — COVID-19 pandemic in Romania

=== January ===
- 1 January – COVID-19 pandemic: The quarantine instated in the municipality of Constanța on 20 November expires on 1 January, at 20:00 EET.
- 3 January – COVID-19 pandemic: The Matei Balș Institute suspects a person who recently returned to Romania to have the British COVID-19 variant, now known as the Alpha variant. The Ministry of Health says that the variant has not yet been confirmed, since it requires the sequencing of the viral genome, starting from the probes selected after real-time PCR testing is done. The Department for Emergency Situations (Romanian: Departamentul pentru Situații de Urgență, DSU) says that no case has been confirmed on the territory of Romania so far. Two probes are collected from the suspected patient for testing. Romanian doctor Radu Țincu states that the suspected person did not recently go in the United Kingdom.
- 8 January – COVID-19 pandemic: The identity of the first case with the more contagious British COVID-19 variant is confirmed to be a 27-year-old woman from Giurgiu who showed up with minimal symptomatology at the "Matei Balș" Institute on 3 January, when she was hospitalised.
- 18 January – COVID-19 pandemic: The National Committee for Emergency Situations (Romanian: Comitetul Național pentru Situații de Urgență) decided to exempt those who had received a second dose of the COVID-19 vaccine at least 10 days prior to their arrival in Romania from quarantine. It has also decided to release from quarantine the close contacts who had been in quarantine for 10 days, had gotten a negative COVID-19 test result on the 8th day, and did not present specific symptomatology. The people coming from the UK who have a confirmed infection no less than two weeks and no longer than 3 months prior to entering Romania, are not needed to present a COVID-19 test result upon on arrival. Quarantine can be temporarily suspended for essential reasons in the case of the people coming from epidemic risk countries.
- 26 January:
  - At around 10:40 EET, a man tells the Bucharest Police (Romanian: Poliția Capitalei) that there is an explosive device inside the Bucharest Court of Appeal (Romanian: Curtea de Apel București). The building is evacuated, and all trials are suspended. Elena Udrea is among the evacuated people, where she was participating in the last term of a trial regarding the financing of the election campaign of then-candidate Traian Băsescu at the 2009 Presidential election. Later that day, the Bucharest Police announces that the bomb threat was a fake one. The trial involving Elena Udrea resumes at 14:00 EET, on the same day.
  - The sitting prosecutor of the National Anticorruption Directorate requests Elena Udrea to be sentenced to prison in the trial regarding the financing of Traian Băsescu's election campaign for the 2009 presidential election. She is accused of instigation to bribe taking and money laundering, which means she could risk up to 12 years in jail.
- 27 January – A snowstorm in the region of Northern Dobruja disrupts traffic on the A2 motorway and some national roads, as well as electric power and water supply, while 27 train services have been suspended. The orange code was declared in the area between 10:00 and 21:00 EET.
- 29 January – At about 5:00 EET, a fire breaks out at the Prof. Dr. Matei Balș National Institute for Infectious Diseases of Bucharest. According to secretary of state Raed Arafat, the first emergency call was made at 05:05, and the first crew arrived 8 minutes afterwards. 102 COVID-19 patients were evacuated and transferred to other pavilions of the hospital, or other hospitals from Bucharest. The cause of the fire is still unknown. The death toll of the fire was 17.

=== February ===
- 8 February – COVID-19 pandemic: New relaxation measures were taken as the epidemiogical situation continued to ameliorate. Schools partially or fully reopened around Romania, based on local incidence rates.
- 11 February – COVID-19 pandemic: The number of vaccine doses administered nationwide exceeds 1 million.
- 16 February – A fire breaks out in an apartment in the sixth floor of an apartment building in Mamaia Boulevard, Constanța. A woman inside the affected apartment tries to escape the fire by leaving via the balcony window, and is afterwards found dead by the medics who tried to resuscitate her.
- 17 February – A simple motion initiated by the Social Democratic Party and supported by the AUR against Minister of Health Vlad Voiculescu fails, as a result of opposition from the member parties of the coalition forming the government at that time (PNL, USR, PLUS, UDMR).
- 17–22 February – Unpaid for ten months, 70 miners from the Lupeni Coal Mine, located at the Jiu Valley, protest by not leaving the mine for a few consecutive days.
- 23 February – COVID-19 pandemic: The death toll from COVID-19 passes 20,000 nationwide.

=== March ===
- 1 March – Two workers who have been renovating an apartment in Onești, Bacău County, are killed by a former inhabitant of the apartment, who lost ownership of it 12 years prior to the incident as a result of a court decision.
- 5 March – COVID-19 pandemic:
  - The first two cases of the South African variant, the Beta variant, were confirmed in Romania, in patients from Bucharest and Pitești respectively.
  - The National Committee for Emergency Situations adopted Decision number 15 which modifies the common agreement between the Ministries of Health and Education on the functioning of schools during the pandemic, so that students in 8th and 12th grades are allowed to participate physically in school no matter what, unless the locality the school is located in is quarantined.
- 8 March – COVID-19 pandemic:
  - The municipality of Timișoara, largest city of Banat, as well as some communes surrounding it, enter lockdown for a period of at least 14 days.
  - The first two cases of the Brazilian variant are confirmed in Romania, both in Bucharest.
- 29 March – Protests against the Romanian Government's response to the COVID-19 pandemic escalate in Bucharest and several other cities. At Bucharest, shop windows, street furniture, bus stations and vending machines were vandalized, with the protest there eventually becoming violent.
- 31 March – COVID-19 pandemic: The lockdown imposed on the municipality of Timișoara on 8 March was lifted at midnight.

=== April ===
- 9 April – The Head of the Department for Emergency Situations Raed Arafat and Health Minister Vlad Voiculescu decided that the Foișor Orthopedy Hospital of Bucharest should only treat patients infected with COVID-19 and that all patients admitted to the hospital should be evacuated as soon as possible, despite the hospital's management stating that it does not meet the criteria for it to become a COVID-19 ward. The decision had led to a protest at the hospital. The next day, USR-PLUS asked that the hospital manager and the ASSMB leader be fired, blaming them for "slowing the process of turning the orthopedy hospital into a COVID hospital".
- 10 April – COVID-19 pandemic: The total number of cases nationwide exceeds 1 million.
- 14 April – Prime Minister Florin Cîțu fires Health Minister Vlad Voiculescu, after multiple controversies throughout his almost four-month term in the Cîțu Cabinet. Andreea Moldovan was fired as well from her position of secretary of state in the Ministry of Health, also by Cîțu. Deputy Prime Minister Dan Barna, the co-president of USR-PLUS, called the decision "politically unilateral and immature" and declared that the alliance forming part of the then-governing coalition no longer supports Cîțu as Prime Minister. Cîțu himself became Minister of Health as interim.
- 16 April – The Court of Appeal of Bucharest legally recognizes the merger of the Save Romania Union (USR) and the Freedom, Unity and Solidarity Party (PLUS), the two parties conforming the electoral alliance 2020 USR-PLUS Alliance, into one single new party known as USR-PLUS. This merger had been decided earlier on 15 August 2020 during an online congress between the members of the two parties. The USR-PLUS will held a new congress in autumn 2021 to choose a new single leadership, with the presidents of both former parties, Dan Barna (USR) and Dacian Cioloș (PLUS), announcing that they will participate in the vote.
- 20 April – A MiG-21 aircraft of the Romanian Air Force (RoAF) crashes in an uninhabited zone near Dedrad in Mureș County during a training flight. The aircraft took off from the RoAF 71st Air Base at Câmpia Turzii at around 14:00 EEST with the company of 2 other aircraft of the same type, with the pilot, lieutenant commander Andrei Criste, later reporting an emergency and ejecting before the crash. The other aircraft returned to the base at around 15:00 EEST and an investigation about the incident was started, while the pilot was taken to a hospital in Târgu Mureș, where he received authorization to be taken to another one in Bucharest.
- 21 April – Ioana Mihăilă, the proposition of USR-PLUS for the Ministry of Health is sworn in by president Klaus Iohannis. She was previously secretary of state in the same Ministry, during the term of Vlad Voiculescu.
- 29 April – COVID-19 pandemic: Romania reports its first cases of the Delta COVID-19 strain, specifically of the B.1.617.2 sublineage, in an outbreak in Brașov County. The strain is thought to be contributing to a surge of COVID-19 infections in India that led to pressure on its healthcare system.

=== May ===
- 5 May – COVID-19 pandemic: Schools begin gradually reopening once again after a prolonged spring break, in conditions much closer to normalcy amid decreasing new infections. The number of scenarios in which they operate have been reduced to 2 instead of 3: below and above 1/1,000 inhabitants. For the first time, special schools operate in their full capacity as long as the locality in which they are located in is not quarantined. This process ended on 10 May when students in the 8th and 12th grades returned to their classrooms.
- 13 May – COVID-19 pandemic: The government announced a series of further relaxation measures, including the lifting of the night curfew and of the requirement of wearing face masks in uncrowded outdoor public areas. They took effect on 15 May.
- 25 May – Ludovic Orban, the president of the PNL announced the election calendar for all National Liberal Party branches, as part of a party congress voted to be held on 25 September. He said that there will be a time period of 45 days, between 10 August and 25 September, for the congress campaign. He also stated that the way the congress is going to be held will depend on how the pandemic plays out.
- 26 May
  - The Parliament of Romania ratifies decision 2020/2053 of the Council of the European Union from 14 December 2020 on the Euratom with a bill. 378 votes were cast in favour of the bill. On the same day, the Chamber of Deputies approves a bill meant to turn the period between 6 and 31 December a holiday dedicated to Romanian carolling. The bill was initiated by Bogdan Gheorghiu, the Romanian Minister of Culture, and PNL senator Alina Gorghiu.
  - A 4.7 Richter magnitude earthquake is registered at 00:30, in Buzău County. With a depth of 128 kilometres, the earthquake was felt in the capital city of Romania, Bucharest.
- 27 May
  - The minister of interior of Romania, Lucian Bode, announces a capture of 2850 new revolvers found in 143 boxes hidden in a furniture transport, on the evening of 24 September, at the border crossing to Isaccea. The truck was driven by a Ukrainian driver, with the destination from Turkey to Ukraine.
  - The Government of Romania launches 11 videos to urge people to get vaccinated. Florin Cîțu, the prime minister of Romania, said that the government paid no money for the video campaign.
  - A Paykan Hillman Hunter from 1974, gifted by the Shah of Iran to former Romanian communist leader Nicolae Ceaușescu is offered for auction.
- 29 May – Aurel Crișan, a 66-year-old businessman, is murdered in a car explosion in front of a Profi store on Aurel Vlaicu boulevard in Arad. The first hypothesis is that the bomb was controlled remotely. The SRI is excluding the hypothesis that the bombing was a terroristic threat.
- 31 May – COVID-19 pandemic: A significant amount of protesters in the Victoriei Square request for the suspension of the vaccination campaign for people that are not at least 18 years old. Their reasons include that "the COVID-19 vaccine is still in clinical studies", that "no student/pupil physically going to school spread the coronavirus", and that "there's no enough information regarding adverse reactions".

=== June ===
- 1 June – COVID-19 pandemic: Even more relaxation measures take effect. Gatherings of maximum 50 people in indoor areas and of maximum 70 people in outdoor areas became possible for private and cultural-artistic events. For the first time, vaccinated people are prioritized when it comes to such measures (however people who had COVID-19 in the past 90 days from infection or with a negative test can also get access to certain tasks); for such people, public areas have a bigger capacity, while clubs and bars have reopened.
- 4 June – The general school inspector of Bucharest, Ionel Pușcaș, was fired by the Education Minister Sorin Cîmpeanu over an incident at the "George Bacovia" School in Sector 4 where a pupil in the 6th grade left the building through a window in the 1st floor due to aggression, after the inspector called it an "ordinary play".
- 15 June – Marcel Ciolacu, president of the Social Democratic Party accuses the USR-PLUS and National Liberal Party of fraud in a vote in the Chamber of Deputies involving a simple motion against Minister of European Funds Cristian Ghinea in an attempt to keep him incumbent by including the votes cast from tablets, which Article 126 of the Regulation of the Chamber of Deputies only allows for normative acts. The motion would have passed if the votes cast from tablets were not included, according to the PSD and the AUR.
- 19 June – A cyclone formed in the Black Sea affects the eastern part of Romania, with floods reported in multiple localities. The city of Galați and the commune of Biliești, Vrancea County were among the most affected by the cyclone. Among the Romanian road network, the Bacău – Onești section of the DN11 (E574) was also notably affected, collapsing on a 100-metre segment. The water in the Putna river reached historical levels higher than during the 2005 floods.

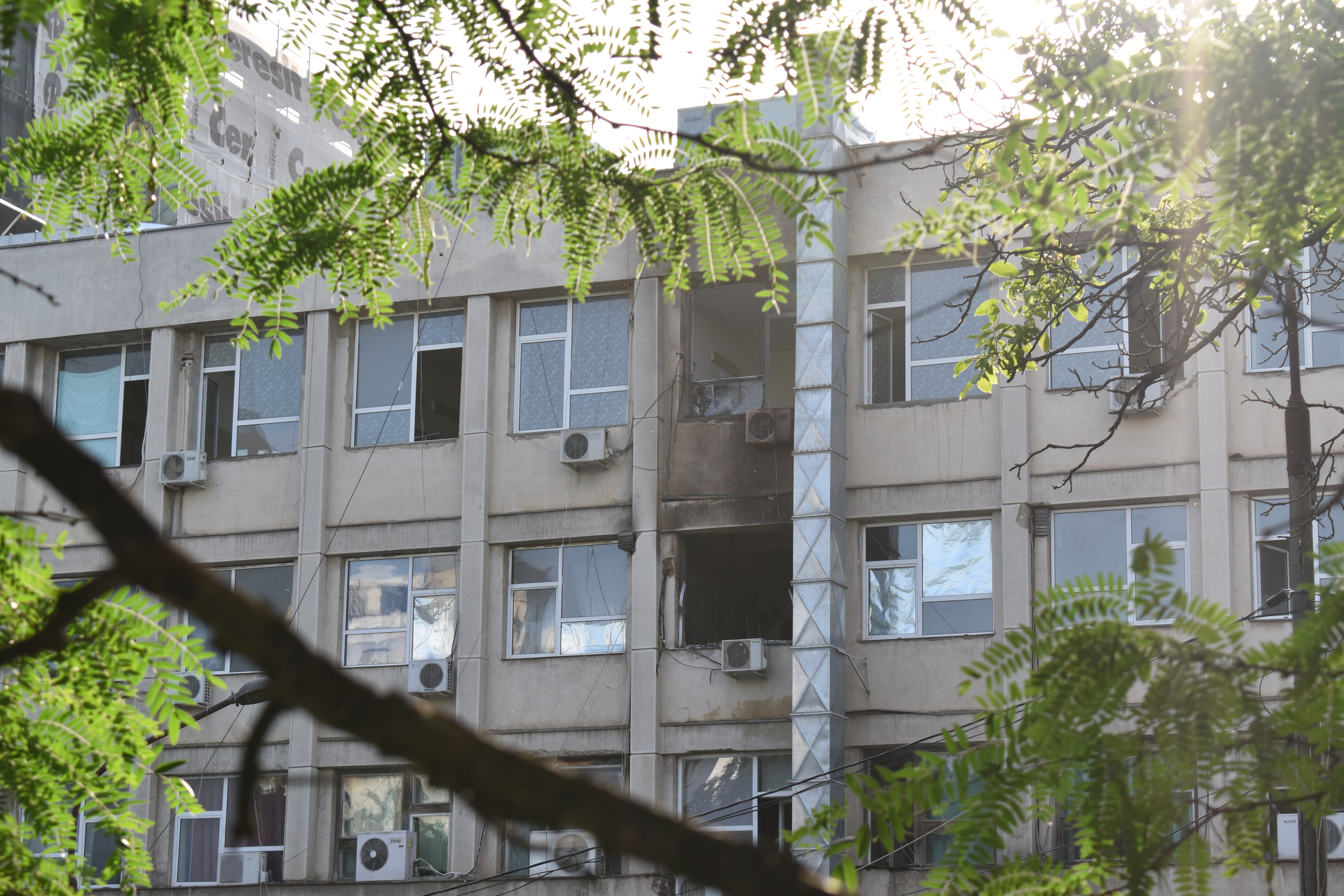
The wing of the "Sfânta Maria" Clinical Emergency Hospital for Children of Iași where the fire took place.

- 22 June – A fire breaks out at the Sfânta Maria children's hospital of Iași. However, unlike other hospital fires in Romania since the Piatra Neamț hospital fire, no one was carbonised but several patients were evacuated. The hospital had an electric installation dating from 1970 and had been under renovation works two years prior.
- 23 June – The Social Democratic Party submits the text of a vote of no confidence aimed against the Cîțu Cabinet, named "FAILED Romania. The 'fantastic' record of the Cîțu Government" (Romanian: România EȘUATĂ. Recordul „fantastic" al Guvernului Cîțu). Sorin Grindeanu, first vice president of the PSD accuses the government of being a danger to Romanians and Romanian businesses, of having frozen pensions and allowances and that it had brought the national Recovery and Resilience Plan (Romanian: Planul Național de Redresare și Reziliență, PNRR) disastrous reforms.
- 27 June
  - Partial local elections take place in 36 localities. In all but one of them, a commune of the Dâmbovița County (where the elections involved the Local Council), the inhabitants have elected a new mayor. The Social Democratic Party won in half of the 36 localities.
  - COVID-19 pandemic: The capital city of Bucharest reports no cases in a day for the first time since the beginning of the pandemic.
- 29 June – The motion of no-confidence known as "FAILED Romania. The 'fantastic' record of the Cîțu Government" (Romanian: România EȘUATĂ. Recordul „fantastic" al Guvernului Cîțu) and aimed against the Cîțu Cabinet was rejected by the Romanian Parliament, with 201 votes "for" and 1 "against". This result came after the leaders of PNL and USR PLUS refused to let the members of their parties to vote and forced them to "remain in their seats", while parliamentarians of the UDMR had abstained on their own.

=== July ===
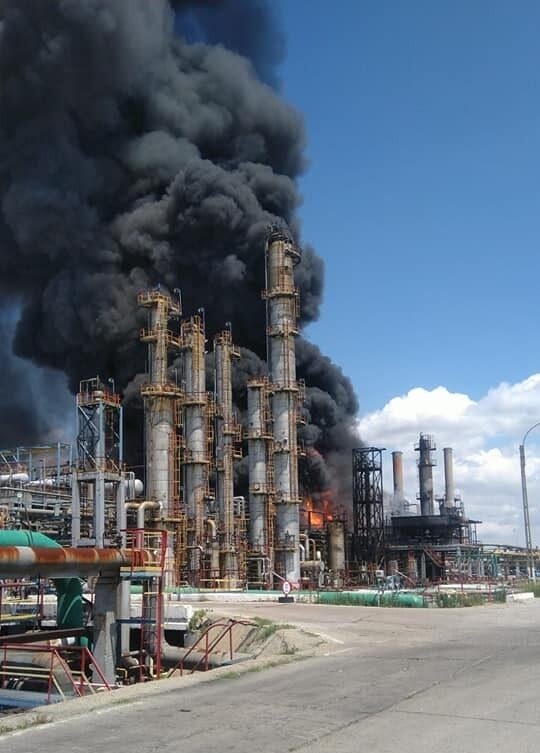
The Petromidia Refinery, as seen during the July 2021 explosion.

- 2 July – 1 dead and 5 injured after an explosion at Petromidia Refinery, the largest Romanian oil refinery, in Năvodari, Constanța County.
- 15 July – The Giurgiu Court admits request of former president of the Social Democratic Party Liviu Dragnea for conditional release from prison, ending 2 years and 2 months of jail that began on 27 May 2019.
- 23 July – A state of alert was imposed in Sector 1 of Bucharest by the prefecture of the capital, at the request of Sector 1 mayor Clotilde Armand, on the grounds of lots of uncollected waste due to the refusal by her administration to pay bills issued by Romprest, the sanitation operator of Sector 1.
- 27 July – Roșia Montană becomes a UNESCO World Heritage Site, 4 years and a half since proceedings began for the listing.

=== September ===
- 1 September – A major political crisis begins in Romania as Prime Minister Florin Cîțu fires Justice Minister Stelian Ion after a dispute between PNL and USR PLUS on the so-called Anghel Saligny investment program (or "PNDL 3").
- 3 September – 2021 Romanian political crisis: USR PLUS, together with the opposition party AUR, submits the motion of no confidence "The firing of the Cîțu Government, the only chance for Romania to live!" aimed against the Cîțu Cabinet.
- 8 September – 2021 Romanian political crisis: President of Romania Klaus Iohannis signs the resignations of the USR PLUS ministers who were in the Cîțu Cabinet, replacing them with acting ministers from PNL and UDMR.
- 25 September – Incumbent President of the National Liberal Party Ludovic Orban loses to Prime Minister Florin Cîțu in an internal election for the party presidency held within a congress with 5000 party delegates.
- 28 September – 2021 Romanian political crisis: The Social Democratic Party (PSD) submits its own motion of no confidence aimed against the Cîțu Cabinet, entitled "STOP poverty, price increases and criminals! Down with the Cîțu Government!", the second in less than a month after that of USR–AUR.

=== October ===
- 1 October:
  - A fire breaks out in the Constanța Hospital for Infectious Diseases in Constanța, leaving 7 deaths.
  - Dacian Cioloș of PLUS was elected as the sole president of USR PLUS, whose name would revert to USR.
- 5 October – 2021 Romanian political crisis: The PSD's "STOP poverty, price increases and criminals! Down with the Cîțu Government!" motion of no confidence passes with 281 votes "for", the largest number of votes since the Romanian Revolution. Consequently, the Cîțu Cabinet was dissolved.
- 11 October – 2021 Romanian political crisis: President Klaus Iohannis nominates USR president Dacian Cioloș as Prime Minister-designate.
- 21 October – 2021 Romanian political crisis: As a result of Cioloș's cabinet failing to pass the parliament, President Iohannis nominates Nicolae Ciucă as Prime Minister-designate, the second in less than 60 days.

=== November ===
- 23 November – 2021 President of the Senate of Romania election
- 25 November – 2021 Romanian political crisis: The Ciucă Cabinet, a PSD–PNL–UDMR grand coalition government, is sworn in to office, ending the crisis.

=== December ===
- 20 December – A several-hour strike by the employees of the CFR suspends more than 100 train journeys and activity of over 50 railway stations in Romania. They protested the low salaries and the fact the law on the status of railway staff does not apply. The CFR's director, Ion Simu, called the strike a "spontaneous illegal protest".

== Sports ==
- March – November – 2022 FIFA World Cup qualifiers
  - 25 March – Romania v North Macedonia
  - 28 March – Romania v Germany
  - 5 September – Romania v Liechtenstein
  - 11 October – Romania v Armenia
  - 11 November – Romania v Iceland
- May – 2021 Women's EHF European League Finals
  - 8 May – Nantes v Minaur Baia Mare
  - 8 May – Siófok v Herning-Ikast
  - 9 May – Minaur Baia Mare v Herning-Ikast
  - 9 May – Nantes v Siófok
- June – UEFA Euro 2020
  - 13 June – Austria v North Macedonia
  - 17 June – Ukraine v North Macedonia
  - 21 June – Ukraine v Austria
  - 28 June – France v Switzerland

== Deaths ==
=== January ===
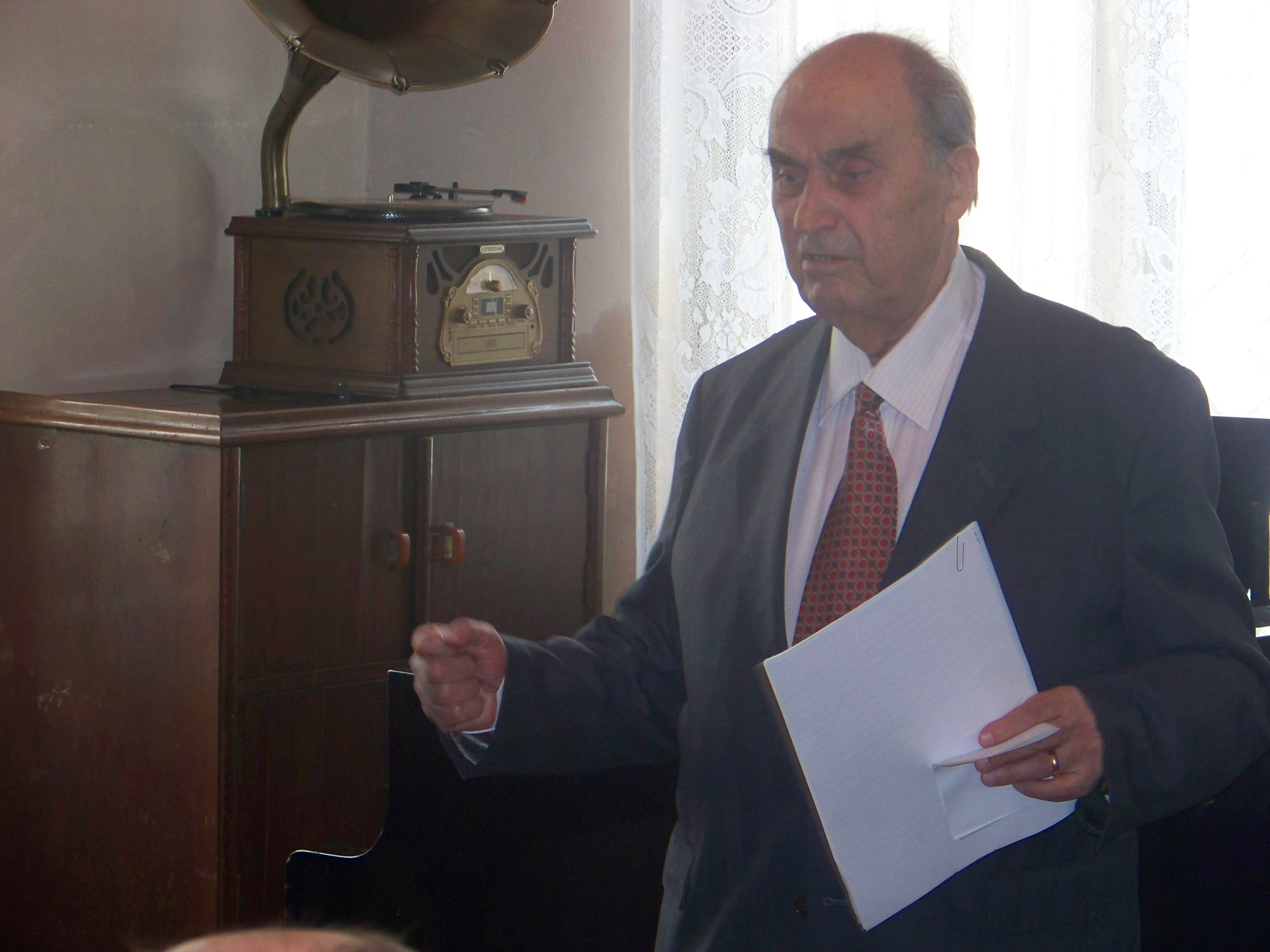
Alexandru Bădulescu

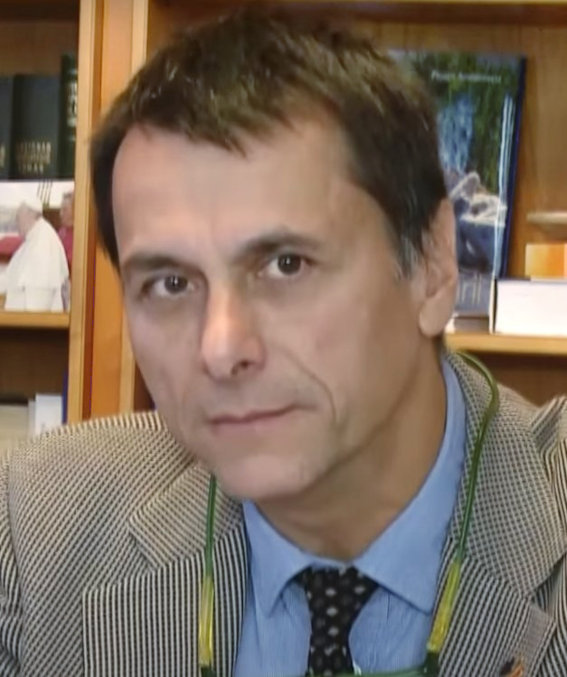
Bogdan Stanoevici

- 1 January
  - Petre Iancu, the coach of the national Romanian dirt track racing team (born 1954)
- 2 January
  - Alexandru Bădulescu, Romanian professor and honorary citizen of Ploiești (born 1929)
- 6 January
  - Mircea Bolba, 59, Romanian football player (Politehnica Timișoara, Bihor Oradea) and manager (Olimpia Satu Mare).
  - Iulian Șerban, Romanian paralympic athlete (born 1985)
- 8 January
  - Iancu Țucărman, Romanian agronomist of Jewish origin and survivor of the Iași pogrom (born 1922)
- 10 January
  - Constantin Rezachevici, Romanian historian (born 1943)
- 11 January
  - Bogdan Macovei, former coach of the national women's handball team of Romania (born 1953)
- 12 January
  - Bogdan Stanoevici, Romanian actor and politician (born 1958)
  - Florentin Crihălmeanu, Romanian Greek Catholic bishop of Cluj-Gherla (born 1959)
- 13 January
  - Mircea Păcurariu, historian of the Romanian Orthodox Church, member of the Romanian Academy, priest and honorary citizen of Sibiu (born 1932)
- 17 January
  - Ruxandra Garofeanu, art critic, president of the Artsociety foundation, former member of the Administrative Board of the TVR and former culture councillor of Sector 2 (born 1944)
- 23 January
  - Oana Ștefănescu, theatre actress at the Odeon Theatre of Bucharest (born 1960)
- 26 January
  - Georgeta Luchian Tudor, actress and wife of Romanian musician Tudor Gheorghe (born 1934)
- 31 January
  - Mihail Popescu, 60, Romanian Olympic ice hockey player (1980).

=== February ===
- 6 February
  - Zamfir Dumitrescu, 74, Romanian painter.
  - Ioan Dzițac, 67, Romanian mathematician and computer scientist, heart attack.
- 9 February
  - Valeria Gagealov, 89, Romanian actress (The Mill of Good Luck, Mihail, câine de circ), COVID-19.
- 15 February
  - Ștefan Tudor, 77, Romanian rower, Olympic bronze medallist (1972).
- 23 February
  - Sergiu Natra, 96, Romanian-born Israeli composer.

=== March ===
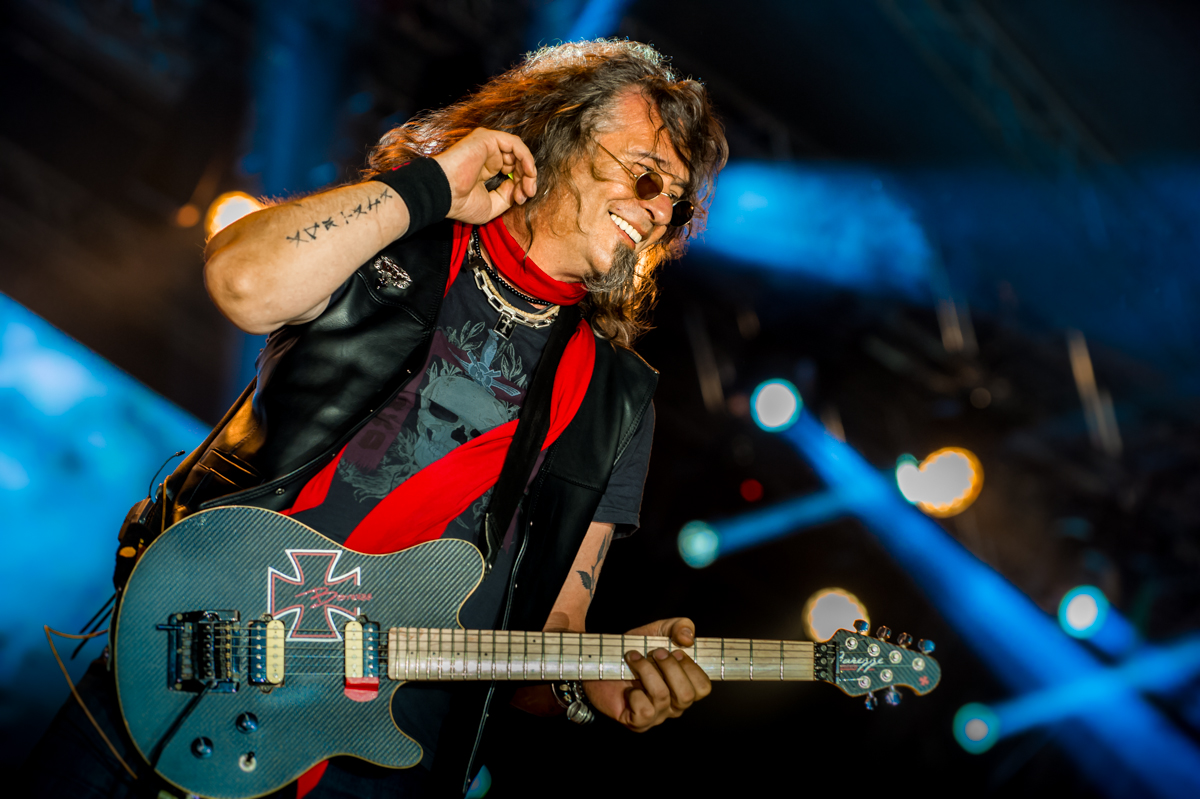
Adi Bărar

- 1 March
  - Gheorghe Dănilă, actor (born 1949)
- 6 March
  - Cassius Ionescu-Tulcea, 97, Romanian-American mathematician.
- 7 March
  - Yechezkel Roth, 85, Romanian-born American rabbi, heart attack.
- 8 March
  - Adi Bărar, founder and leader of Romanian heavy metal band Cargo (born 1960)
- 11 March
  - Takis Mousafiris, 84, Greek Aromanian composer and songwriter, cancer.
- 14 March
  - Aurora Cornu, writer and the first wife of Marin Preda (born 1931)
- 16 March
  - Líviusz Gyulai, 83, Romanian-born Hungarian graphic designer.
- 18 March
  - Zeev Aram, 89, Romanian-born British furniture designer.
- 26 March
  - Cornelia Catangă, Romanian fiddle-singer (born 1958)
- 28 March
  - Constantin Simirad, 79, Romanian politician, mayor of Iași (1992–2003) and diplomat, ambassador to Cuba (2003–2006), COVID-19.

=== April ===
- 2 April
  - Nelu Ploieșteanu, Romanian fiddle-singer (born 1950)
  - Gabi Luncă, Romanian fiddle-singer (born 1938)
- 3 April
  - Remus Câmpeanu, Romanian footballer (born 1938)
- 7 April
  - Paul Popovici, 72, Romanian football player (Bihor Oradea, UTA Arad, national team) and manager, heart attack.
- 15 April
  - Aleksandr Churilin, 74, Russian diplomat, ambassador to Romania (2006–2011).
- 19 April
  - Marin Voinea, 85, Romanian footballer (Progresul București, Siderurgistul Galați, national team).
- 29 April
  - Gabriela Eminovici, cardiologist and chief doctor of the Cardiology I section of the Sibiu County Emergency Hospital.
- 30 April
  - Ioan Pop de Popa, founder of the modern Romanian cardiovascular surgery school (born 1927)

=== May ===
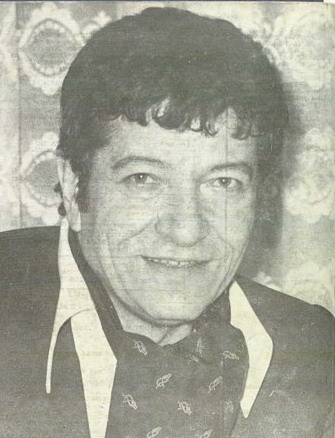
Ion Dichiseanu

- 12 May
  - Ileana Vulpescu, Romanian writer and translator (born 1932)
- 20 May
  - Ion Dichiseanu, Romanian actor (born 1933)
  - Adrian Rădulescu, president of the Romanian Farmers' Association, former secretary of state in the Ministry of Agriculture and vice-president of the People's Movement Party (born 1955)
- 31 May
  - Andreea Bollengier, 46, Romanian-born French chess player, Woman International Master (2000).

=== June ===
- 4 June
  - Yosef Govrin, 90, Israeli diplomat, ambassador to Romania (1985–1989) and to Austria, Slovakia, and Slovenia (1993–1995).
- 6 June
  - Aby Har Even, 84, Romanian-Israeli engineer, complications from arson injuries.
- 10 June
  - Gheorghe Staicu, 85, Romanian football player (Steaua București) and manager (Olimpia Satu Mare, Universitatea Cluj).
- 19 June
  - Adrian Cernea, former national rally champion.
- 28 June
  - Ivan Bordi, 83, Romanian Olympic water polo player (1956).
  - Florin Condurățeanu, Romanian journalist (born 1950)

=== July ===
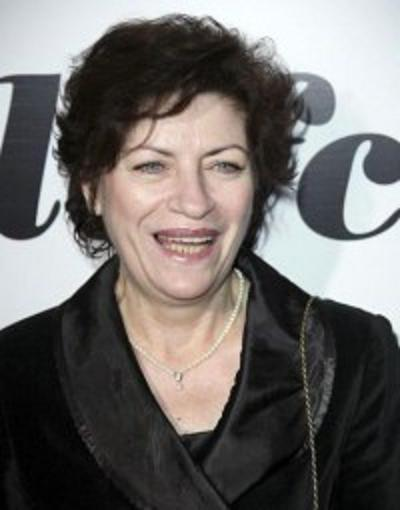
Luminița Gheorghiu

- 4 July
  - Luminița Gheorghiu, Romanian actress (born 1949)
- 11 July
  - George Ciamba, Romanian diplomat (born 1965)
- 12 July
  - Joshua Perper, 88, Romanian-born American pathologist and toxicologist, chief medical examiner of Broward County, Florida (1994–2011).
- 23 July
  - Doru Stănculescu, Romanian singer (born 1949)
- 29 July
  - Valer Săsărman, Romanian footballer (born 1969)

=== August ===
- 13 August
  - Vladimir Mendelssohn, 71, Romanian composer and violist.
- 25 August
  - Ileana Gyulai-Drîmbă-Jenei, 75, Romanian fencer, Olympic bronze medallist (1968, 1972).
- 29 August
  - Valer Săsărman, 52, Romanian football player (Gloria Bistrița) and manager (FC Bistrița), stroke.

=== September ===
- 5 September
  - Ion Caramitru, Romanian actor and politician (born 1942)
  - Ivan Patzaichin, Romanian canoe sprinter olympic (born 1949)
- 17 September
  - Constantin Olteanu, 75, Romanian footballer (Argeș Pitești), Olympic team (1972).
- 20 September
  - Pavel Țugui, 99, Romanian political activist and literary historian. (death announced on this date)

=== October ===
- 2 October
  - Ladislaus Löb, 88, Romanian-born Swiss Germanist and Holocaust survivor.
- 3 October
  - Dan Petrescu, 68, Romanian businessman, plane crash.
- 10 October
  - Cornel Drăgușin, 95, Romanian football player (Steaua București) and manager (Iraq national team, Syria national team).
- 16 October
  - Coleta de Sabata, 86, Romanian engineer, rector of Politehnica University of Timișoara (1981–1989).
- 21 October
  - Gurie Georgiu, Romanian Orthodox prelate, first Bishop of the Diocese of Deva and Hunedoara (born 1968)
- 27 October
  - Ludovic Zanoni, 86, Romanian Olympic cyclist (1960).
- 28 October
  - Pavel Coruț, 72, Romanian writer and intelligence officer.
- 31 October
  - Aurel Vainer, 89, Romanian politician, deputy (2004–2016).

=== November ===
- 1 November
  - Alexandru Cecal, Romanian chemist, professor at the Alexandru Ioan Cuza University of Iași (born 1940).
- 4 November
  - Károly Király, 91, Romanian politician, senator (1990–1992).
- 13 November
  - Dragoș Petre Dumitriu, 57, Romanian journalist and politician, deputy (2004–2008), post-COVID-19 heart attack.

=== December ===
- 10 December
  - Constantin Năsturescu, 81, Romanian footballer (Rapid București, Progresul Brăila, national team).
- 23 December
  - Dan Berindei, 98, Romanian historian.
- 27 December
  - Victor Socaciu, Romanian folk singer, composer and politician (born 1953)

== See also ==
- 2021 in the European Union
- 2021 in Europe
- Romania in the Eurovision Song Contest 2021
- Romania at the 2020 Summer Olympics
- Romania at the 2020 Summer Paralympics
