= Sălătruc =

Sălătruc may refer to several places in Romania:

- Sălătruc, a village in the town of Dărmănești, Bacău County
- Sălătruc, a village in Cășeiu Commune, Cluj County
- Sălătruc, a village in Blăjeni Commune, Hunedoara County
- Sălătruc, a village in Greci Commune, Mehedinţi County
- Sălătruc, a tributary of the Bistra Mărului in Caraș-Severin County
- Sălătruc, a tributary of the Jiul de Est in Hunedoara County
- Sălătruc (Someș), a tributary of the Someș in Cluj County

See also:

- Sălătrucel, a commune in Vâlcea County
- Sălătrucu, a commune in Argeș County
