= Strâmbu =

Strâmbu may refer to several places in Romania:

- Strâmbu, a village in Chiuiești Commune, Cluj County
- Strâmbu, a tributary of the Șușița in Gorj County
- Strâmbu, a tributary of the Valea de Pești in Gorj County
- Strâmbu (Sălătruc), a tributary of the Sălătruc in Cluj County
- Strâmbu, a tributary of the Buzău in Brașov County
- Strâmbul Băiuț, a tributary of the Lăpuș in Maramureș County

== See also ==
- Strâmba (disambiguation)
- Strâmbeni (disambiguation)
