= Sălătruc (Someș) =

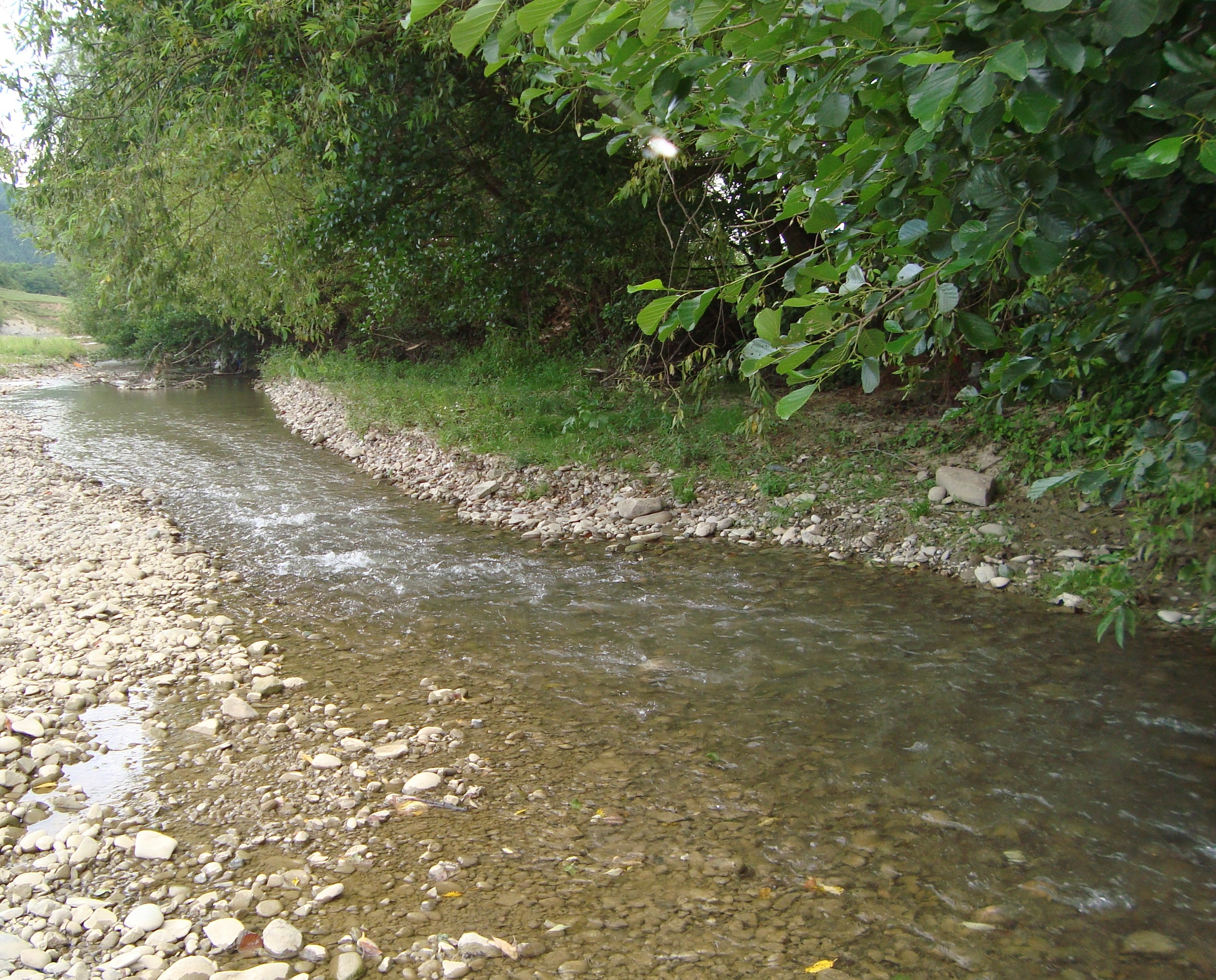

- Location within Romania

Location
- Country: Romania
- Counties: Cluj County
- Villages: Chiuiești, Sălătruc, Rugășești, Cășeiu

Physical characteristics
- Mouth: Someș
  - location: Cășeiu
  - coordinates: 47.1868°N 23.8306°E
- Length: 26 km (16 mi)
- Basin size: 152 km^{2} (59 sq mi)

Basin features
- Progression: Someș→ Tisza→ Danube→ Black Sea
- Tributaries
  - left: Strâmbu

The Sălătruc is a right tributary of the river Someș in Romania. It discharges into the Someș in Coplean. Its length is 26 km (16 mi) and its basin size is 152 km^{2} (59 sq mi).
