= Strâmba =

Strâmba may refer to the following rivers in Romania:

- Strâmba, a village in the commune Josenii Bârgăului, Bistrița-Năsăud County
- Strâmba, tributary of the Amaradia in Gorj County
- Strâmba, tributary of the Dorofei in Olt County
- Strâmba, tributary of the Ilișua in Bistrița-Năsăud County
- Strâmba, tributary of the Ilva in Bistrița-Năsăud County
- Strâmba, tributary of the Lepșa in Vrancea County
- Strâmba (Mureș), tributary of the Mureș in Harghita County
- Strâmba, tributary of the Cornet in Timiș County
- Strâmba, tributary of the Olt in Sibiu County
- Strâmba, tributary of the Printre Văi in Sălaj County
- Strâmba, tributary of the Râușor in Argeș County
- Strâmba, tributary of the Sălăuța in Bistrița-Năsăud County
- Strâmba, tributary of the Sebeș in Sibiu County
- Strâmba, tributary of the Șercaia in Brașov County
- Strâmba, tributary of the Suciu in Maramureș County
- Strâmba, tributary of the Tazlău in Bacău County
- Strâmba, tributary of the Tismana in Gorj County
- Strâmba, tributary of the Tur in Satu Mare County

== See also ==
- Strâmbu (disambiguation)
- Valea Strâmbă (disambiguation)
