= Strâmbeni =

Strâmbeni may refer to several villages in Romania:

- Strâmbeni, a village in Căldăraru Commune, Argeș County
- Strâmbeni, a village in Suseni Commune, Argeș County

== See also ==
- Strâmbu (disambiguation)
