= Valea Strâmbă =

Valea Strâmbă may refer to the following places in Romania:

- Valea Strâmbă, Harghita, a village in the commune Suseni, Harghita County
- Valea Strâmbă, a tributary of the Valea Cheii in Argeș County
- Valea Strâmbelor, a tributary of the Bârsa Fierului in Brașov County

== See also ==
- Strâmba (disambiguation)
