= Strâmbu (Sălătruc) =

- Location within Romania

Location
- Country: Romania
- Counties: Cluj County
- Villages: Strâmbu

Physical characteristics
- Mouth: Sălătruc
  - location: Chiuiești
  - coordinates: 47.2972°N 23.8733°E
- Length: 13 km (8.1 mi)
- Basin size: 47 km^{2} (18 sq mi)

Basin features
- Progression: Sălătruc→ Someș→ Tisza→ Danube→ Black Sea

The Strâmbu is a left tributary of the river Sălătruc in Romania. It flows into the Sălătruc in Chiuiești. Its length is 13 km (8.1 mi) and its basin size is 47 km^{2} (18 sq mi).
