= Florin Roman =

Romanian politician (born 1974)

Minister of Digitalization
- In office 25 November 2021 – 15 December 2021
- Preceded by: Barna Tánczos (Acting)
- Succeeded by: Marcel Boloș

Acting President of the Chamber of Deputies
- In office 18 October 2021 – 2 November 2021
- Preceded by: Ludovic Orban
- Succeeded by: Sorin Grindeanu (Acting)

Personal details
- Born: April 22, 1974 (age 51) Alba Iulia, Alba County, Romania
- Party: National Liberal Party (since 2014)
- Other political affiliations: Democratic Liberal Party (before 2014)

Florin Claudiu Roman (born 22 April 1974) is a Romanian politician, incumbent member of the Romanian Chamber of Deputies since 2016. He served from 18 October 2021 to 2 November 2021 as interim President of the Chamber of Deputies, after the resignation of Ludovic Orban on 13 October, and as Minister of Digitalization in the Ciucă Cabinet from 25 November to 15 December 2021, when he resigned on the grounds of accusations of plagiarism, and significant irregularities on his Curriculum vitae. The plagiarism concerns were raised in the newspaper Libertatea, who explained they could not locate an academic paper that was listed on his CV and there were concerns raised about misleading statements regarding which university he attended.
