= Gurie Georgiu =

Romanian clergyman (1968–2021)

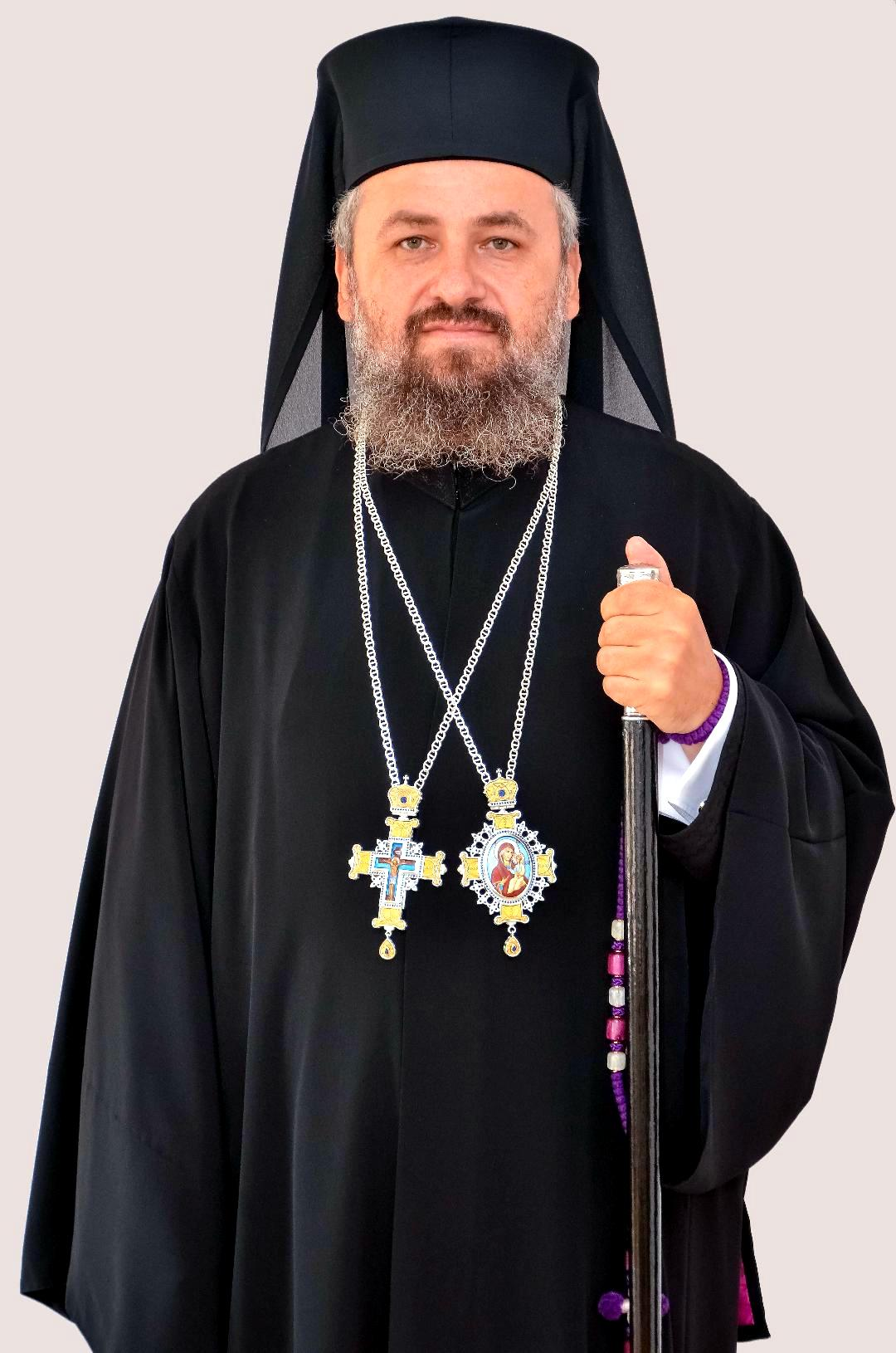
Bishop Georgiu

Bishop Gurie (secular name Grigore Georgiu; 31 December 1968 – 21 October 2021) was a Romanian prelate and member of the Holy Synod of the Romanian Orthodox Church.

He served as the first Bishop of the Diocese of Deva and Hunedoara from its establishment in 2009 until his death from COVID-19 complications in October 2021, amid the COVID-19 pandemic in Romania.

== Early life and education ==
Georgiu was born in the village of Huta, Cluj County, Romania, on 31 December 1968. He attended elementary school in Huta and Gheorghe Lazăr pedagogical high school in Cluj-Napoca from 1976 to 1984.

He studied at the Orthodox Theological Seminary in Craiova from 1988 to 1992. Georgiu then completed his degree at the Faculty of Theology of the University of Craiova from 1992 to 1996.

== Positions held ==
Georgiu was elected vicar of the Archdiocese of Craiova in July 2001. Following the establishment of the new Diocese of Deva and Hunedoara on 29 October 2009, Gurie Georgiu was elected as its first, founding bishop one month later on 29 November of the same year. He remained Bishop of Deva and Hunedoara until his death.

== Death ==
Georgiu was admitted to Deva County Emergency Hospital (SJU) in Deva on 8 October 2021, for treatment of advanced COVID-19 during the COVID-19 pandemic in Romania. His condition continued to deteriorate and he was placed on a ventilator on 19 October 2021. Hospital officials decided to airlift him by helicopter to a larger medical center in Târgu Mureș, but he suffered cardiac arrest, a complication of COVID, during the transfer.

Despite doctors attempts to resuscitate him after 45 minutes, Georgiu died from the virus at Deva County Emergency Hospital in Deva, Romania, on 21 October 2021, at the age of 52.
