= Cargo (band) =

Romanian rock band

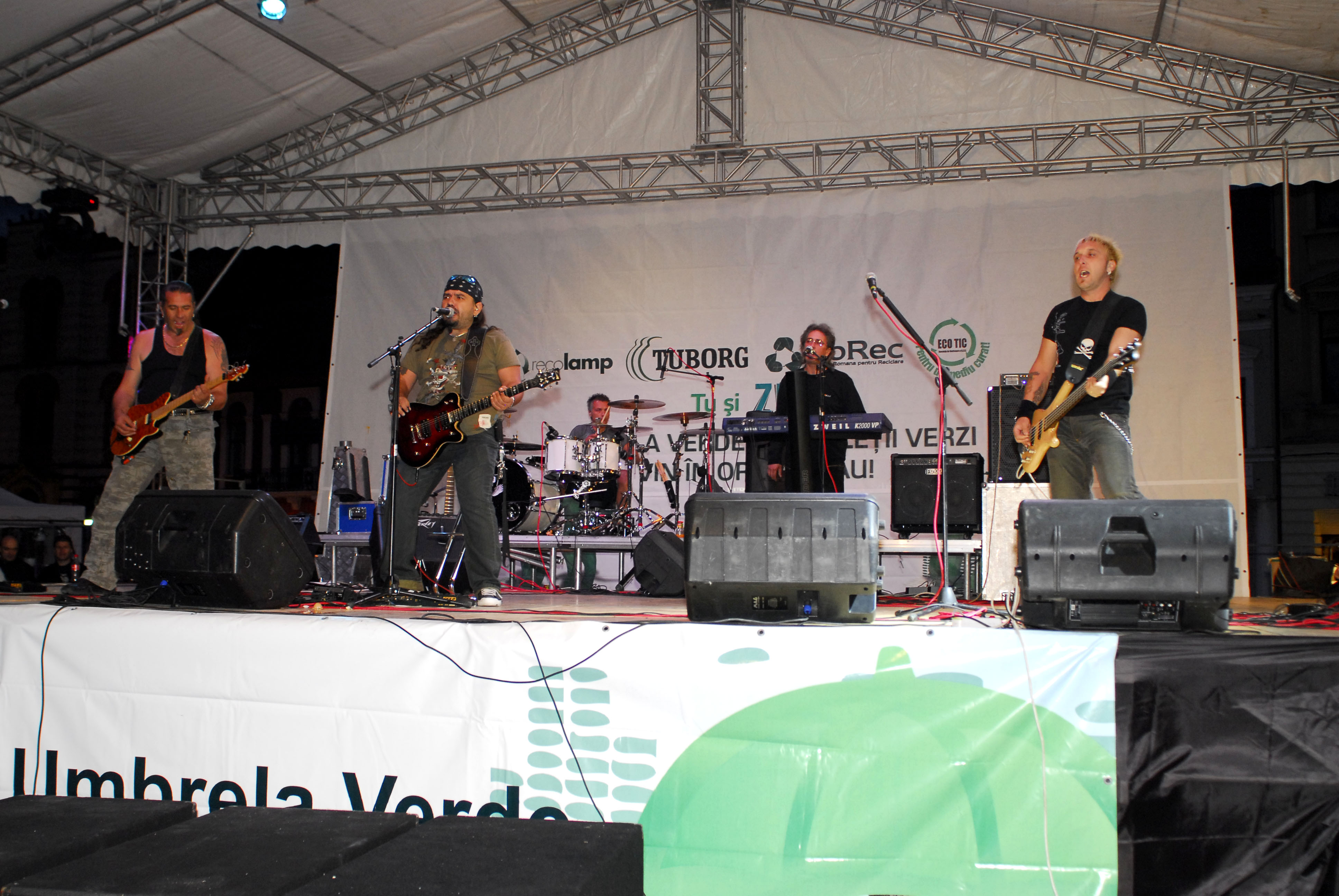

Background information
- Origin: Timișoara, Romania
- Genres: Heavy metal; hard rock
- Years active: 1985–present
- Labels: Electrecord, Vivo, MediaPro Music
- Members: Octavian Pilan; Adrian Igrișan; Alin Achim; Ionuț Cârjă; David Cristian
- Website: https://cargorock.ro/

Cargo is a Romanian heavy metal band from Timișoara. (Note: Not to be confused with the 1972 same name Dutch heavy prog group.)

== Biography ==
Cargo was formed by Adrian Bărar in 1985, after he quit the new wave band Autostop. The original line-up was Tavi Iepan (guitar), Carol Bleich (drums), Tiberiu Gajdo (bass), Dinel Tollea (keyboards) and Adrian Bărar (guitar, vocals).

In 1988, the group recruited Ovidiu Ioncu "Kempes" as their new vocalist. He would stay with the band for the next 15 years, lending his voice to 4 full-length albums. During these years, Cargo toured the country extensively, playing numerous festivals, and receiving radio airplay, becoming the most well-known heavy metal band in the country.

In 2003, Kempes decided to leave the band, and emigrate to Australia, so the vocal duties were taken over by guitarist Adrian Igrișan. After considering to organize auditions for a new vocalist, they finally decided on leaving Igrișan to handle both guitar and vocals. With this line-up they recorded their 5th album, Spiritus Sanctus, which was released the same year. The power ballad "Dacă ploaia s-ar opri" received massive airplay on both radio and television, with Cargo becoming a household name in Romania. It is still one of the most commonly played tracks in Romanian media.

The band continues to play live, often being invited to play at large open-air events.

== Band members ==
=== Current members ===
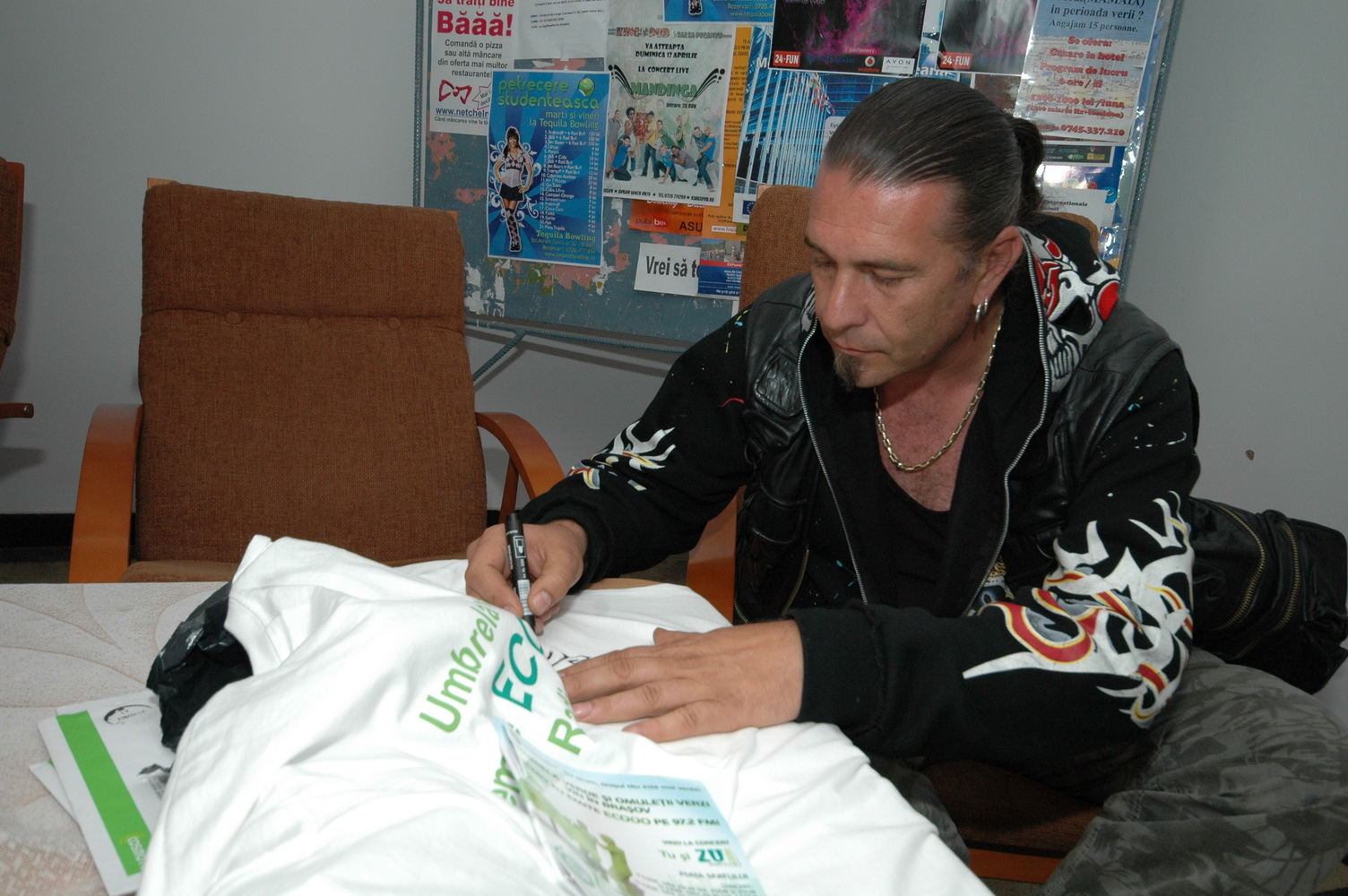
Adrian Bărar

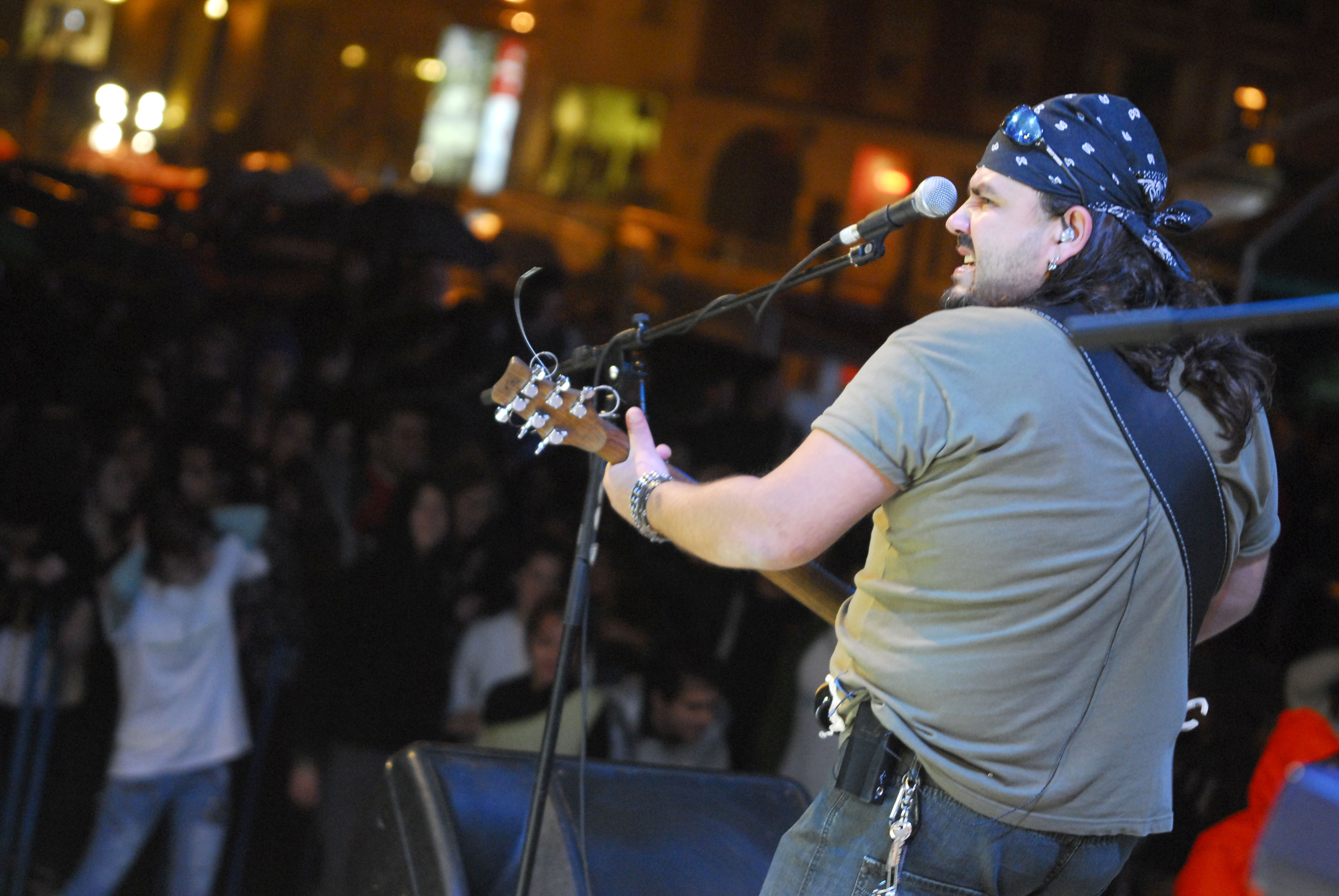
Adrian Igrișan

- Adrian Igrișan (vocals / guitar)
- Octavian Pilan (drums)
- Ionut Cârjă (keyboards)
- Alin Achim (bass guitar)
- David Cristian (guitar)

=== Former members ===
- Adrian Bărar (guitar / vocals)
- Ovidiu Ioncu "Kempes" (vocals)
- Florin "Barbie" Barbu (bass guitar, backing vocals)
- Ramon Radosav (bass guitar, violin)
- Carol Bleich (drums)
- Octavian Iepan (guitar)
- Tibi Gajdo (guitar)
- Dinel Tollea (keyboards)
- Nae Ionel Tarnotzi
- Leo Iorga (vocals)
- Peter Kocsef (drums)
- Tibi Bako (bass guitar)
- Mircea Nedelcu (vocals)
- Raul Dudnic (bass guitar)
- Adrian Popescu (guitar)
- Cristian Pup (keyboards)

== Discography ==
=== Albums ===
- Povestiri din gară (Tales from a Train Station) – 1992
- Destin (Destiny) – 1995
- Colinde și obiceiuri de iarnă (Carols and Winter Customs) 1996, re-released with the Teofora choir in 1999
- Ziua vrăjitoarelor (Day of the Witches) – 1998
- Colinde (Christmas Carols) – 2000
- Spiritus Sanctus – 2003
- Cargo XXII (Best Of) – 2007
- Vinyl – (Live) 2016

=== Singles and other releases ===
- Brigadierii (The Rangers) – 1989
- Buletin de știri (Newsflash) – 1989
- Doi prieteni/Ana (Two friends/Ana) – 1990
- Capra/Lui – on Darul Magilor 1 Compilation – 1995
- Clasa muncitoare & Batacanda (The Working Class & Batacanda) – on Unplugged Romania compilation – 1996
- Steaua & Urare/Bucuria Crăciunului (The Star & Good Wish/The Joy of Christmas) – on Darul Magilor 3 Compilation – 1997
- Cântecul Paștelui (Easter Song) – 1998, released as a video
- Bagă-ți mințile-n cap (Get Serious) – maxi-single – 2000
- Mama (Mother) – 2000, released as a video
- Cargo Box Set – includes the albums Povestiri din gară, Destin and Ziua Vrăjitoarelor
- Dacă ploaia s-ar opri (If the Rain Would Stop) – 2003, released as a video
- Nu pot trăi fără tine (I Can't Live Without You) – 2004, released as a video
