= Dragoș Petre Dumitriu =

Romanian politician and journalist (1964–2021)

Member of the Chamber of Deputies of Romania
- In office 2004–2008

Personal details
- Born: 17 February 1964
- Died: 13 November 2021 (aged 57)
- Party: PRM

Dragoș Petre Dumitriu (17 February 1964 – 13 November 2021) was a Romanian politician and journalist. He was a member of the Greater Romania Party and served in the Chamber of Deputies from 2004 to 2008.

Dumitriu contracted COVID-19 in October 2021, amid its pandemic in Romania. He died from a post COVID heart attack on 13 November 2021, at the age of 57.
