= Chiuiești =

- Commune
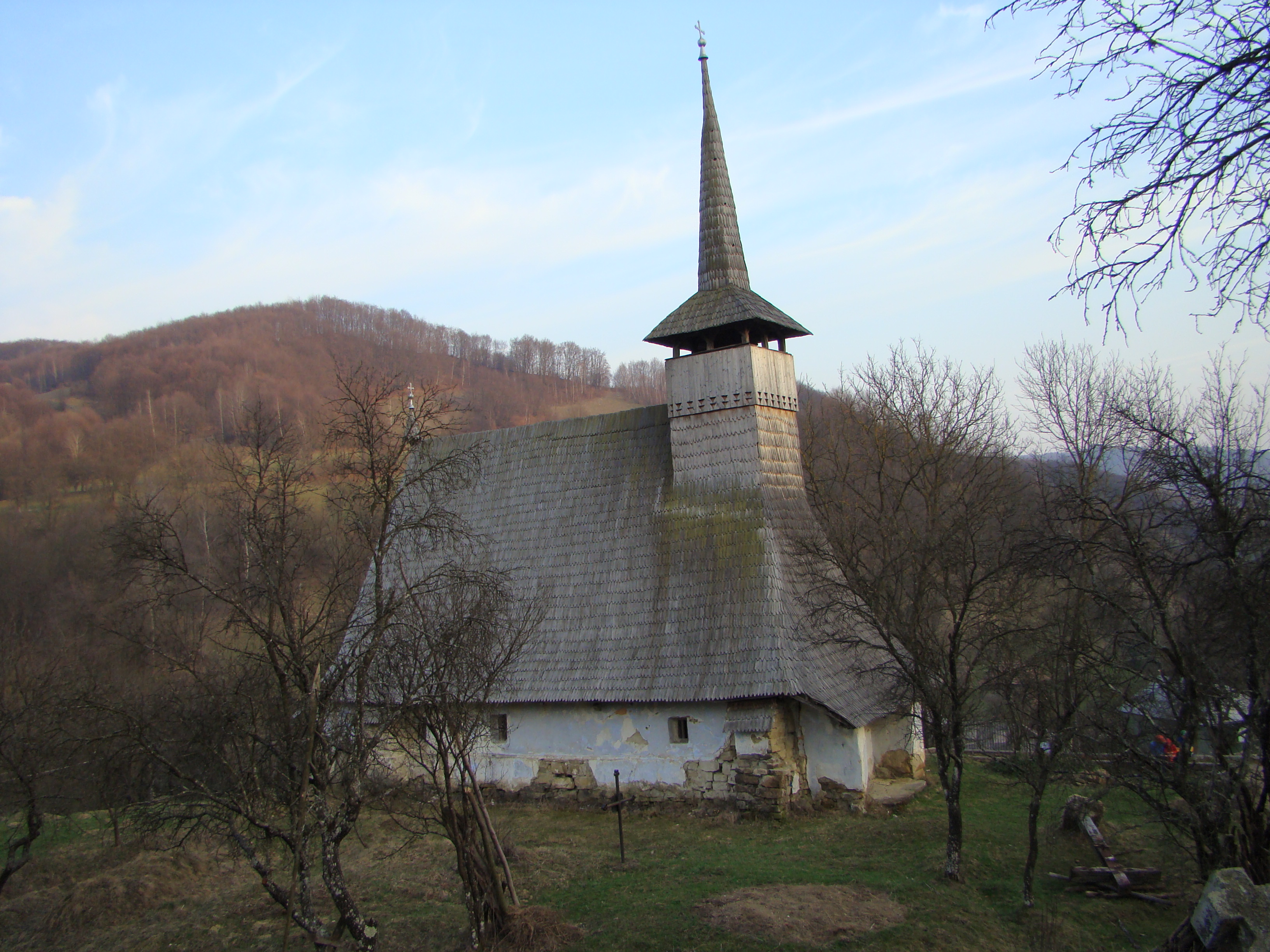
- Church of the Holy Archangels in Strâmbu

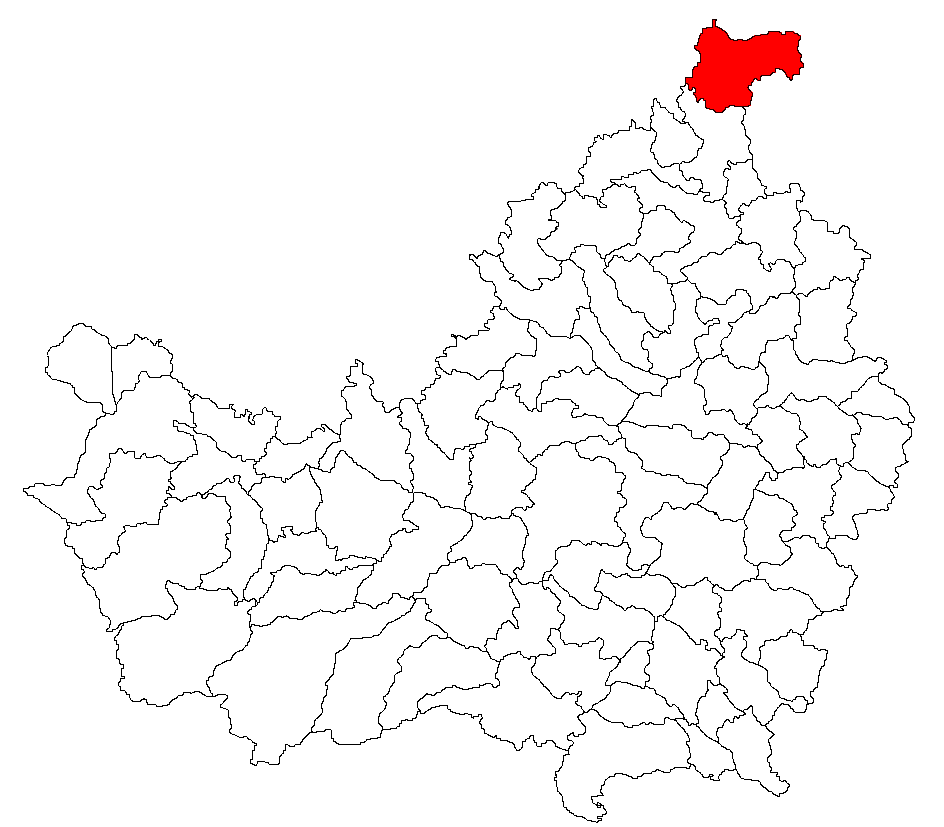
- Location in Cluj County

- Location in Romania
- Coordinates: 47°17′40″N 23°52′30″E
- Country: Romania
- County: Cluj
- Established: 1467
- Subdivisions: Chiuiești, Dosu Bricii, Huta, Măgoaja, Strâmbu, Valea Cășeielului, Valea lui Opriș

Government
  - Mayor (2020–2024): Gavril Mihuț (PNL)
- Area: 112.51 km^{2} (43.44 sq mi)
- Elevation: 324 m (1,063 ft)
- Population (2021-12-01): 2,082
  - Density: 18.51/km^{2} (47.93/sq mi)
- Time zone: UTC+02:00 (EET)
  - Summer (DST): UTC+03:00 (EEST)
- Postal code: 407215
- Area code: +(40) x64
- Vehicle reg.: CJ
- Website: primariachiuiesti.ro

Chiuiești (Hungarian: Pecsétszeg) is a commune in Cluj County, Transylvania, Romania. It is composed of seven villages: Chiuiești, Dosu Bricii (Bricshát), Huta (Huta), Măgoaja (Hollómező), Strâmbu (Horgospataka), Valea Cășeielului (Kesiel), and Valea lui Opriș (Oprisvölgy).

The commune is located in the northernmost corner of the county, bordering the Sălaj, Maramureș, and Bistrița-Năsăud counties. Chiuiești is 19 km (12 mi) from Dej and 74 km (46 mi) from the county seat, Cluj-Napoca; it is crossed by national road DN18B, which runs from Cășeiu, 14 km (8.7 mi) to the south, to Baia Mare, 68 km (42 mi) to the north.

== Demographics ==
At the 2011 census, Chiuiești had a population of 2,332, of whom 98.8% were ethnic Romanians and 1.1% Roma. At the 2021 census, the commune had a population of 2,082; of those, 94.52% were Romanians.

== Natives ==
- Gurie Georgiu (1968–2021), Romanian Orthodox prelate, first Bishop of the Diocese of Deva and Hunedoara.
- Pintea the Brave (1670–1703), heroic haiduc.
