= Adrian Bărar =

Romanian musician (1960–2021)

Adi Bărar
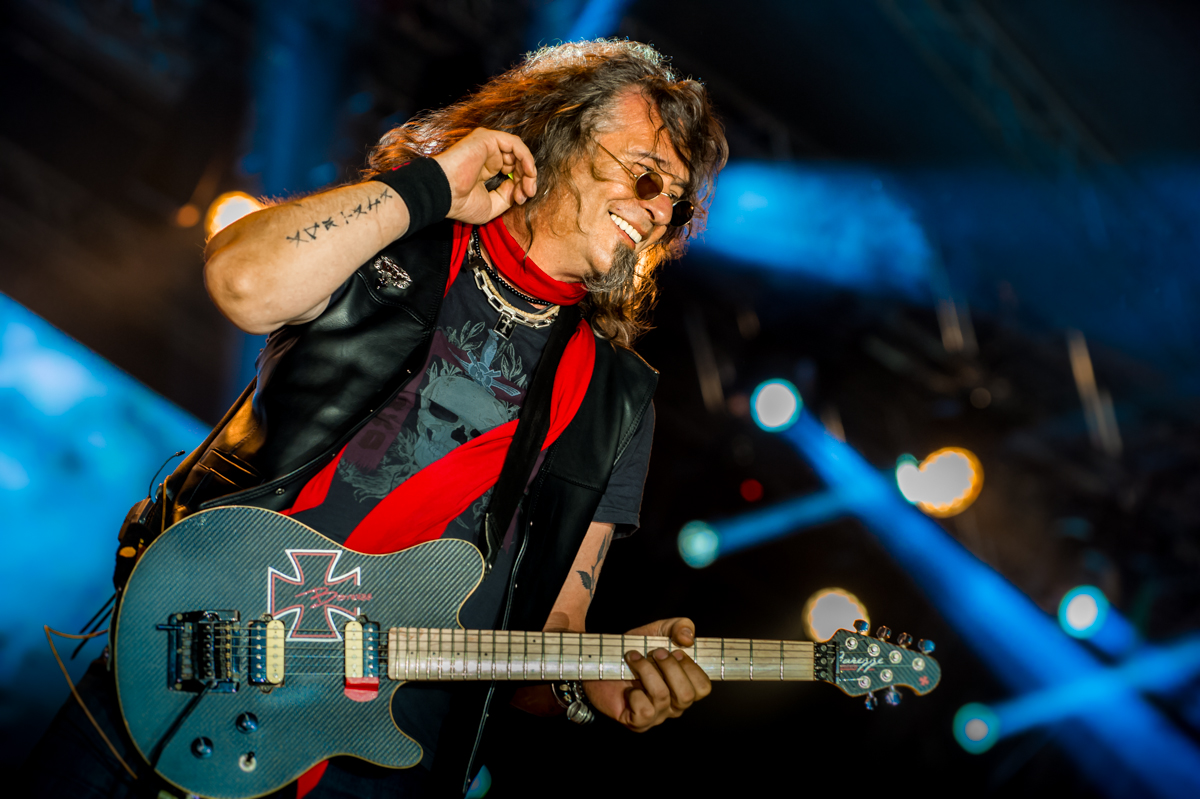
- Adrian Bărar, 7 June 2015

Background information
- Born: Adrian Armand Bărar; 15 January 1960; Timișoara, Timișoara district, Regiunea Timișoara, Romanian People's Republic
- Died: 8 March 2021 (aged 61) Timișoara, Timiș County, Romania
- Genres: Rock; hard rock; heavy metal; blues
- Occupation: Musician
- Instrument: Guitar
- Years active: 1985–2021
- Labels: MediaPro Music, Universal Music Group, Electrecord, East&Art, Vivo
- Formerly of: Cargo

Adrian Armand Bărar (15 January 1960 – 8 March 2021) was a Romanian guitarist and composer.

== Biography ==
Bărar was the founder of the Heavy metal band Cargo. He died from COVID-19 on 8 March 2021, in his hometown of Timișoara during the COVID-19 pandemic in Romania. He also had other health problems.
