= Károly Király =

Romanian politician (1930–2021)

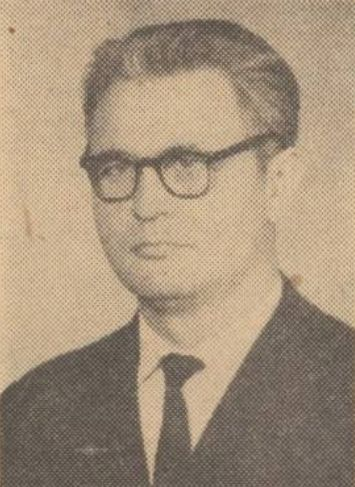

Member of the Central Committee of the Romanian Communist Party
- In office 12 August 1969 – 28 November 1979

Member of the Great National Assembly
- In office 1969–1973

Member of the Senate of Romania
- In office 1990–1992

Personal details
- Born: 26 September 1930 Diciosânmartin, Kingdom of Romania
- Died: 4 November 2021 (aged 91) Budapest, Hungary
- Party: PCR (until 1989); UDMR (from 1989)

Károly Király (26 September 1930 – 4 November 2021) was a Romanian politician. A member of the Communist Party of Romania and, after the Romanian Revolution, of the Democratic Alliance of Hungarians in Romania, he served in the Great National Assembly from 1969 to 1973 and the Senate of Romania from 1990 to 1992.
