= Ivan Bordi =

Romanian water polo player

Personal information
- Nationality: Romanian
- Born: 21 January 1938; Târgu Mureș, Romania
- Died: 28 June 2021 (aged 83)

Sport
- Sport: Water polo

Ivan Bordi (21 January 1938 – 28 June 2021) was a Romanian water polo player. He competed in the men's tournament at the 1956 Summer Olympics.
