= Diocese of Deva and Hunedoara =

The Diocese of Deva and Hunedoara (Romanian: Episcopia Devei și Hunedoarei) is a diocese of the Romanian Orthodox Church. Its see is the Saint Nicholas Cathedral in Deva and its ecclesiastical territory covers Hunedoara County. The diocese forms part of the Metropolis of Transylvania. It has five archpriests' districts, around 230 parishes, two monasteries, eight sketes and a seminary for nuns. It was established in 2009, the year Gurie Georgiu became the diocese's first bishop.
