= Cășeiu =

- Commune
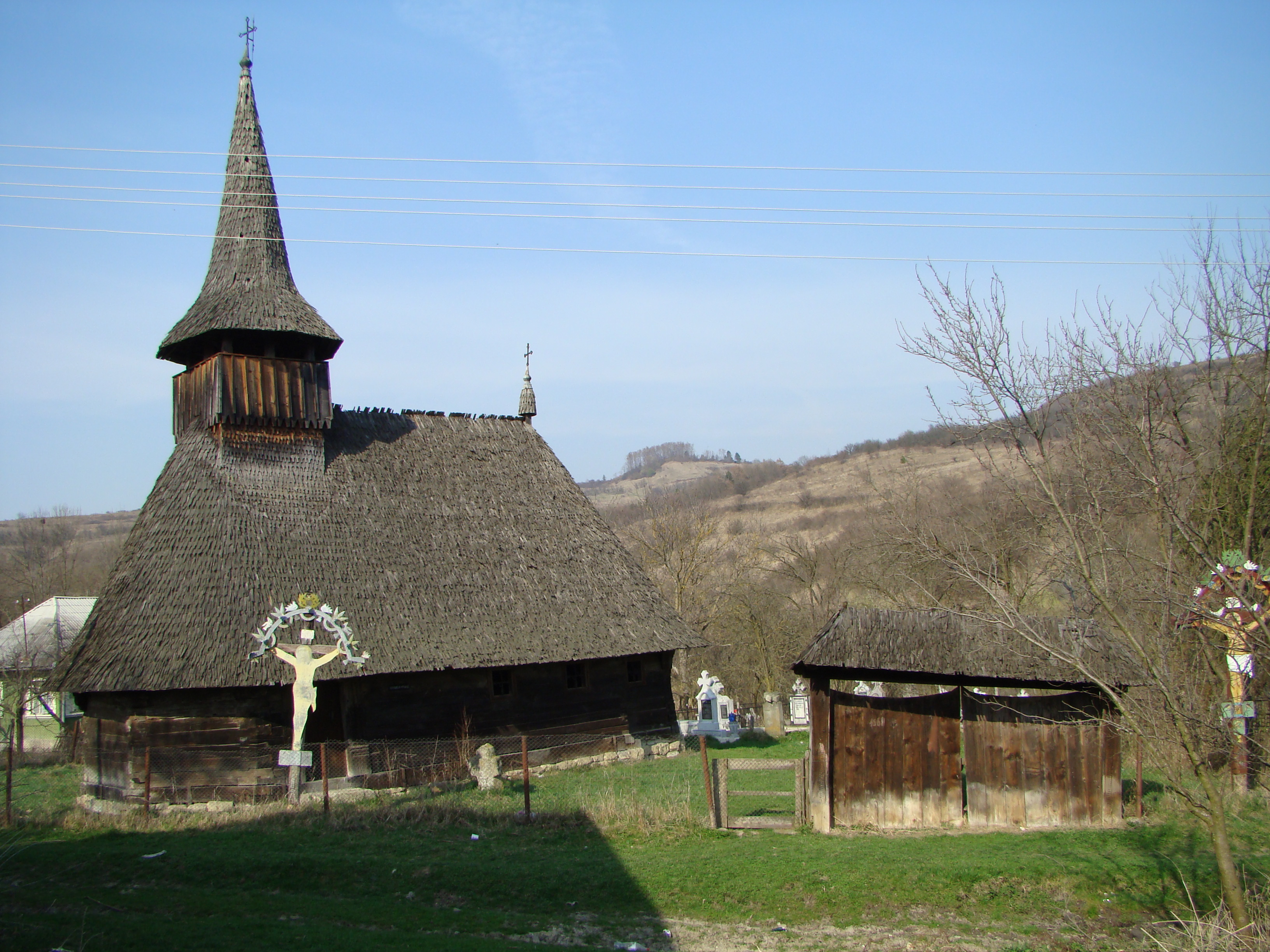
- Wooden church of the Archangels in Gârbău Dejului

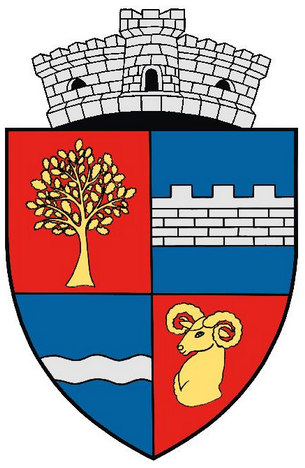
- Coat of arms

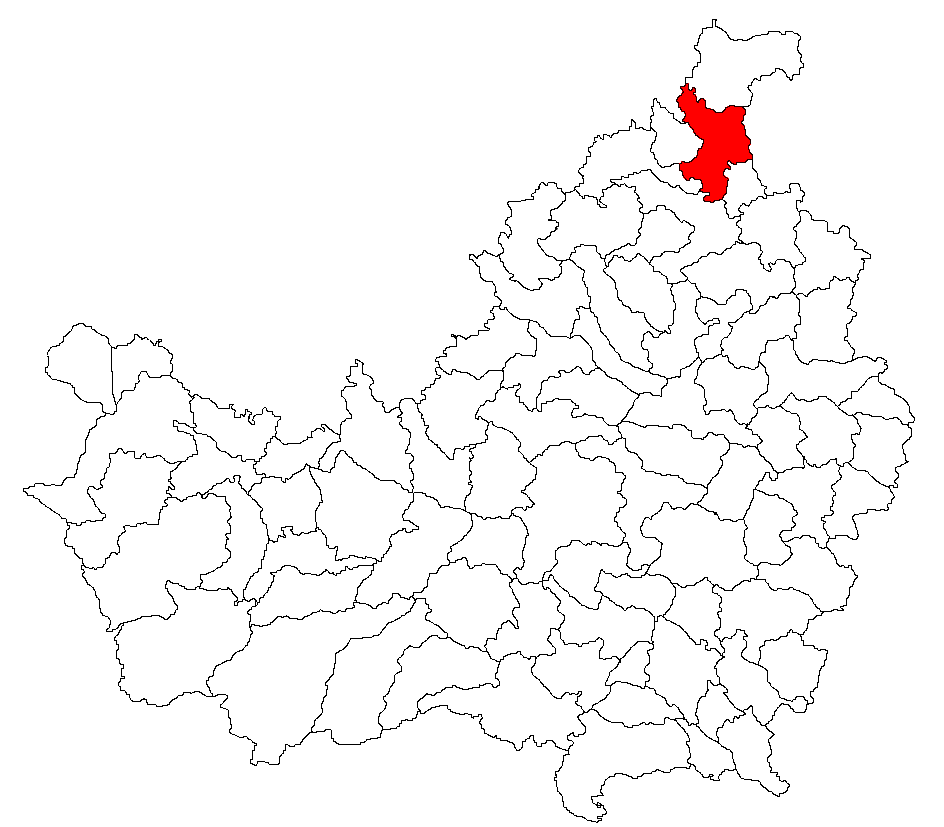
- Location in Cluj County

- Location in Romania
- Coordinates: 47°11′N 23°51′E
- Country: Romania
- County: Cluj
- Established: 1241
- Subdivisions: Cășeiu, Comorâța, Coplean, Custura, Gârbău Dejului, Guga, Leurda, Rugășești, Sălătruc, Urișor

Government
  - Mayor (2020–2024): Silviu Boldor (PSD)
- Area: 83.28 km^{2} (32.15 sq mi)
- Elevation: 241 m (791 ft)
- Population (2021-12-01): 4,375
  - Density: 52.53/km^{2} (136.1/sq mi)
- Time zone: UTC+02:00 (EET)
  - Summer (DST): UTC+03:00 (EEST)
- Postal code: 407155
- Area code: +(40) x64
- Vehicle reg.: CJ
- Website: www.caseiu.ro

Căşeiu (Hungarian: Alsókosály; German: Koschal) is a commune in Cluj County, Transylvania, Romania. It is composed of ten villages: Cășeiu, Comorâța, Coplean (Kapjon), Custura (Dumbráva), Gârbău Dejului (Désorbó), Guga (Guga), Leurda (Leurda határrész), Rugășești (Felsőkosály), Sălătruc (Szeletruk), and Urișor (Alőr).

== Demographics ==
According to the census from 2002 there was a total population of 4,882 people living in this commune; of those, 94.44% were ethnic Romanians, 4.67% ethnic Roma, and 0.83% ethnic Hungarians. At the 2021 census, Cășeiu had a population of 4,375, of which 85.05% were Romanians and 8.39% Roma.

== Natives ==
- Ioan Rus (born 1955), politician
