= Timișoara Pride Week =

LGBT pride festival in Timișoara, Romania

- Nickname: Pride TM
- Status: Active
- Genre: LGBT pride festival
- Date: June/July
- Frequency: Annually
- Locations: Timișoara, Romania
- Years active: 2019–present
- Participants: 2,000 (2026)
- Major events: Art exhibition; film projection; party; pride parade; theatre performance
- Organizer: Identity.Education; eQuiVox

Timișoara Pride Week, also known as Pride TM, is a festival dedicated to the LGBT community that takes place annually in Timișoara, Romania, since 2019. Chronologically, it is the third festival of its kind in Romania after those in Bucharest (2004) and Cluj-Napoca (2017). The first edition took place between 3 and 7 June 2019 and was organized by two local LGBT NGOs, Identity.Education and eQuiVox. It was funded by MozaiQ through the Community Fund and individual donations.

== History ==
=== Background ===
The LGBT rights movement in Romania began to gain ground in the mid-1990s, after homosexual relations between two consenting adults were decriminalized in 1996. Later, in 2001, Article 200, which punished homosexual relations with imprisonment, was repealed entirely. In 2000, the Isărescu Government introduced an anti-discrimination law based on sexual orientation in the areas of goods and services, healthcare, education, employment and housing, and in 2006 hate crimes and incitement to hatred based on sexual orientation were outlawed. All this allowed greater social visibility of LGBT people and their culture and created the premises for organizing and LGBT festival; the first edition of Bucharest Pride (then known as GayFest) took place in 2004, while the first pride parade unfolded in 2005.

Up until 2017, Bucharest Pride was the only event of its kind in Romania. Over the years, LGBT-related events also sprung up in regional cities. As of 2026, pride parades take place in Bucharest (by far the largest), Cluj-Napoca, Iași, Oradea and Timișoara. The appearance of other events outside the capital, including Timișoara, was mainly catalyzed by the constitutional referendum of 2018, which sought to ban same-sex marriage.

=== 2019: first edition ===
The first edition of the festival was organized between 3 and 7 June 2019. The events included, among others, a vernissage, an info bio show at the German State Theatre, a conference on LGBT rights hosted by the West University, a picnic in Queen Marie Park and parties in local venues. The 2019 edition had as partners the Timișoara – European Capital of Culture Association, the Student Organization of the West University of Timișoara, the Timiș County Youth Foundation, as well as the West University of Timișoara.

=== 2022: first pride parade ===
The first pride parade took place during the fourth edition of the festival, held between 25 June and 3 July 2022. The march was attended by around 800 people, among them the vice-mayor Ruben Lațcău from the Save Romania Union (USR), representatives of the embassies of United Kingdom and United States, as well as parliamentarians from Norway. The parade unfolded between C. D. Loga Park and Queen Marie Park and was overseen by important police forces and gendarmes to prevent any incidents.

Unlike the first pride parade in Cluj-Napoca, whose registration applications were delayed 22 times and which was diverted from a more central route, the Pride TM parade did not meet the opposition of the local authorities.

== Editions ==
External images
- Pride TM 2022 at Inquam Photos
- Pride TM 2023 at TION
- Pride TM 2024 at Inquam Photos

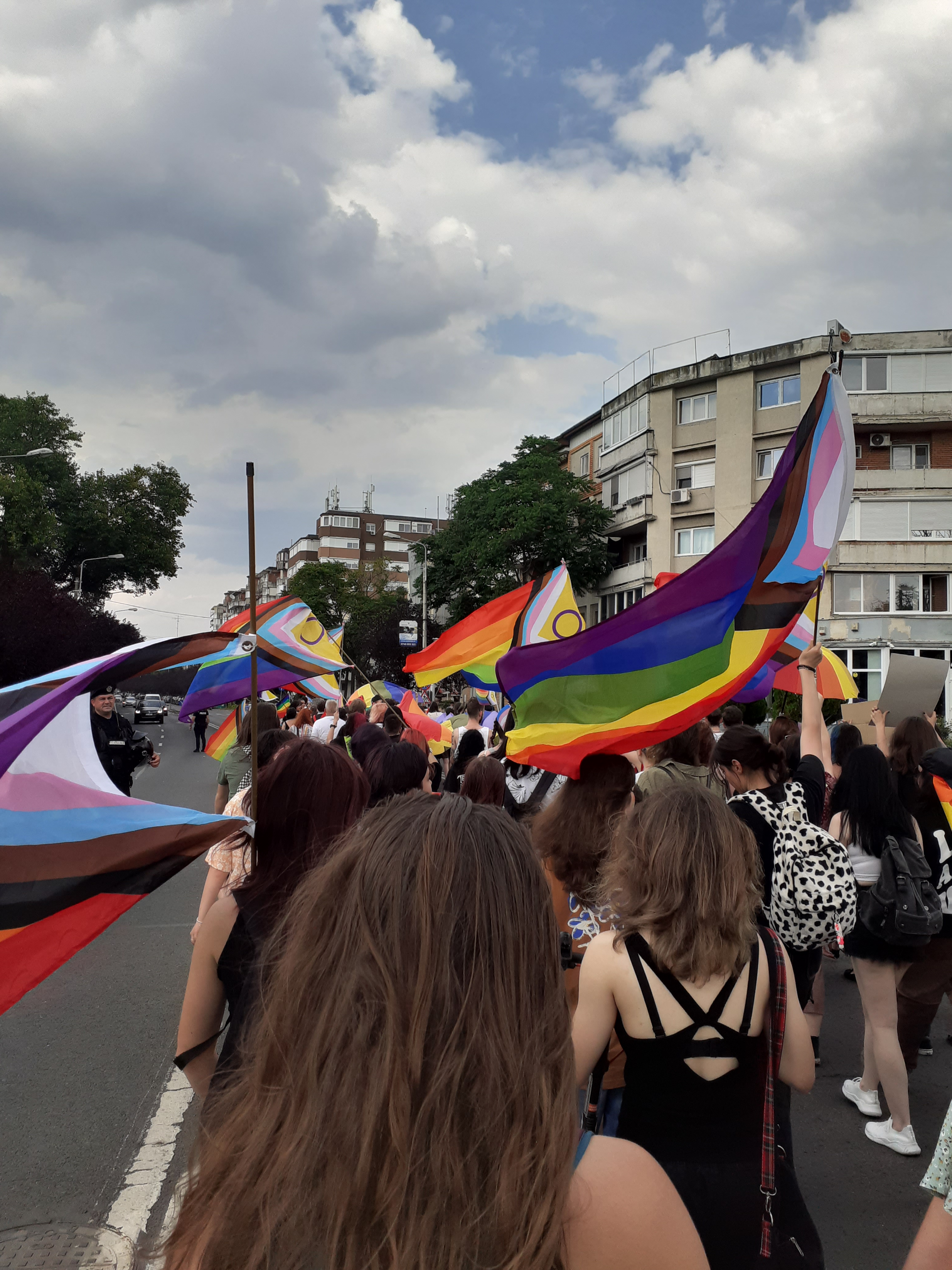
Demonstrators at the pride march in Timișoara, 2023

Edn.	Date	Attendance
1st	3–7 June 2019	No pride parade
2nd	19 December 2020	Online event (Note: Organized jointly with Bucharest Pride and Cluj Pride under the name Winter Pride)
3rd	6–14 August 2021	No pride parade
4th	25 June–3 July 2022	800
5th	24 June–1 July 2023	1,200
6th	1–6 July 2024	1,500
7th	23–28 June 2025	1,200
8th	29 June–5 July 2026	2,000

== Reactions ==
At first, the organization of the festival met the opposition of conservative far-right groups and local religious groups. For instance, Ionel Tuțac, president of the Community of Christian Baptist Churches in Timișoara, contested the manifestation and declared himself "dismayed" by the involvement of public institutions of culture and university education in hosting some events within the festival. A similar position was held by the county councilor Mihăiță Bojin from the National Liberal Party (PNL), preacher at the Emanuel Baptist Church in Timișoara. Other local councilors from PNL criticized the financial support offered by Timișoara City Hall for the Pride TM events. Also, small groups of priests attended some of the events as a sign of protest, while some of the exhibitions were vandalized. The organizers were also subjected to online bullying.

However, over the years, public opinion on the subject softened, and the pride parades did not met significant opposition, such as organized counter-protests.

Local political figures refrained from showing their solidarity with Pride TM for fear of a backlash from the conservative electorate. Among the few who showed their support were vice-mayor Ruben Lațcău and senator Raoul Trifan, both from USR.

== Organizers ==
=== eQuiVox ===
An informal group without legal personality, eQuiVox was born in the fall of 2018, as a reaction to the activity and homophobic discourse of the Coalition for Family. The coalition's activity materialized in a national referendum to redefine the notion of spouses (currently gender-neutral) in the Romanian Constitution, held between 6 and 7 October 2018. The referendum was boycotted by almost 80% of the voters, which prompted eQuiVox to take the first steps towards organizing the first LGBT pride festival in Timișoara and western Romania. Eventually, the first edition of Pride TM took place in the first week of Pride Month 2019, but it did not include a pride parade like the festivals in Bucharest and Cluj-Napoca.

=== Identity.Education ===
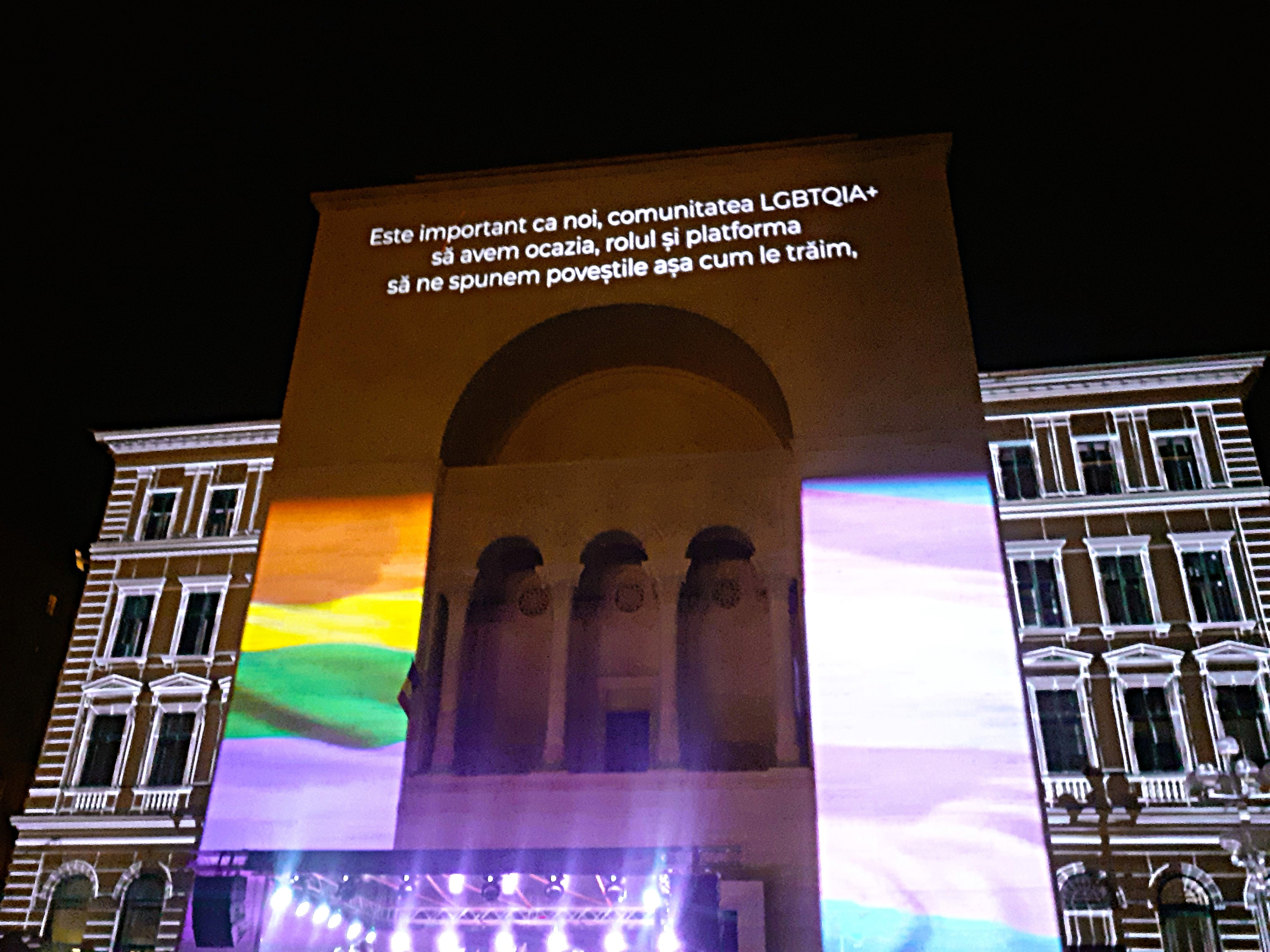
The Palace of Culture illuminated with the projection of rainbow and transgender flags during the screening of the documentary Freedom? (2023)

Identity.Education (stylized as +iE) also appeared in the run-up of the October 2018 family referendum. The first event co-organized by Identity.Education took place during the Human Rights Day celebrations, in December 2018. Subsequently, in January 2019, it organized the first own cultural and artistic event, Q Talks. In October of the same year, it organized the first edition of the LGBT History Month in Timișoara, observed in Romania since 2012. Also in October 2019, it received the official organizing documents from Romanian authorities. The +iE Center was inaugurated in December 2021 and serves as a space for community events and exhibitions, as well as the office of the NGO. +iE was a partner of Timișoara 2023 in developing projects for the route "Fluid perspectives – Overcoming old mentalities through the power of culture" as part of Timișoara's application file for the title of European Capital of Culture.

+iE is the oldest of the two LGBT rights organizations in Timișoara, the only ones currently active. The first such organization was called LGBTeam and was founded in 2006.
