= Timeline of LGBTQ history in Romania =

Homosexual acts in Romania were decriminalized on 6 September 2001.

== Middle Ages ==
As with much of Europe during the time, the Romanian Middle Ages were largely characterized by hard labor and poverty brought about by classism; these issues played-into wider problems of societal regression, repression and oppression, with the exception of the elites. Due to the hard living of the time, morality was held in extremely high regard, with Christianization (by Saint Andrew in Dobruja) as well as the geographical location of the country (roughly “east meets west”) having had a large impact on local religious fervor. Political troubles and warfare with the Ottoman Empire fueled rampant Islamophobia and amplified the general population’s sense of bigotry, especially towards non-Christians or those accused of “non-Christian behaviors”. There is evidence of harsh punishments for those caught-in or accused of homosexuality—although typically only for poor citizens. The nobility could freely engage in any and all sexual desires, though not always completely discreetly nor to the complete approval of their fellow elites. Sex and sexuality, as a general rule, was largely discouraged and frowned upon in medieval Europe, unless procreation was the ultimate goal. Nonetheless, evidence of homosexuality and LGBT individuals during the Romanian Middle Ages can be found in Dan Horia Mazilu's book, Voievodul, dincolo de sala tronului:

- Radu was raped at Adrianople (present-day Edirne), at the court of sultan Murad II.
- The sobriquet of Radu, Vlad the Impaler's brother (the Handsome, the Beautiful), results from effeminate traits and behavior of the prince.
- Iliaș Rareș would have converted to Islam to get sexual favors. His bisexual behavior is also mentioned by historian Dan Horia Matei, having as source the chronicle of Grigore Ureche.
- Mihnea Turcitul is the alleged lover of Koca Sinan Pasha.
- Alexandru Iliaș would have resorted to prostitutes, the best known being a Greek homosexual, Batiste Veveli, fact also mentioned by Miron Costin in his chronicle.

== Modern era ==
- 1864 – The Penal Code promulgated by Alexandru Ioan Cuza, inspired by the French model, does not stipulate any punishment for homosexual acts. At the end of the 19th century, the Penal Code in Transylvania, in force since 1878, punished only the homosexual rape, stipulated in Article 242.
- 1929 – Pamfil Șeicaru names writer Panait Istrati "poor poet of deflowered arses". Istrati is the first Romanian author to write a novel – Chira Chiralina – in which a character is homosexual.
- 1933 – Writer Geo Bogza is imprisoned for a short time in Văcărești penitentiary for indecent behavior. Bogza just published the volume of poetry Poemul invectivă. One of his creations is about a pederast. Nicolae Ceaușescu was also imprisoned in Doftana, in the 1930s, for communist agitation. After the Revolution, there were allusive discussions about homosexual relationships that young Ceaușescu had maintained at Doftana with his colleagues of detention.
- 1936 – The Penal Code of Carol II passes in unlawfulness the consented homosexual relationship. Article 431 provides imprisonment for "acts of sexual inversion" when provoking public scandal. Thus, any act of sexual inversion brought to public knowledge could be punished with imprisonment from six months to two years.

== Under communist regime ==
- 1947 – The penalty for sexual inversion increases once with the installation of the communist regime. Thus, the mildest sentence was imprisonment for two years.
- 1957 – The Penal Code is amended again, pederasts being liable to imprisonment from three to ten years.
- 1968 – Homosexuality emerges as a linguistic term in the new Penal Code. Ideologically, homosexuality was unproductive for the Communists, who needed heroine mothers and an ascending demographic trend. The Grand National Assembly elaborates a completely revised version of the Penal Code, and sexual acts between persons of the same sex are considered crimes against the person and punished by Article 200: "sexual relations between persons of the same sex shall be punished with imprisonment from one to five years".
- 1977 – Ion Negoițescu, open homosexual, writes to anti-communist dissident Paul Goma, in sign of solidarity. Securitate prefers to rake in Negoițescu's intimate past than to arrest him for assault on national security, which would have blamed Romania internationally. Young writer Petru Romoșanu, wherewith Negoițescu would have homosexual relationships, is forced by Securitate to denounce as homosexual Negoițescu and other writers. Negoițescu has a suicide attempt with a dose of medication. Negoițescu and other gay writers escaped condemnation by the intervention of writer Ștefan Augustin Doinaș, deconspired after 1990s as Securitate collaborator.
- 1981–85 – "Morals" department of Bucharest Militia conducted an extensive investigation in this period. 54 gay Bucharesters should have been tried and convicted. But the case was stopped by Suzana Gâdea, Minister of Culture in those years, whereas among defendants appeared many artists and even officials of the Central Committee.

== Evolutions since 1993 ==
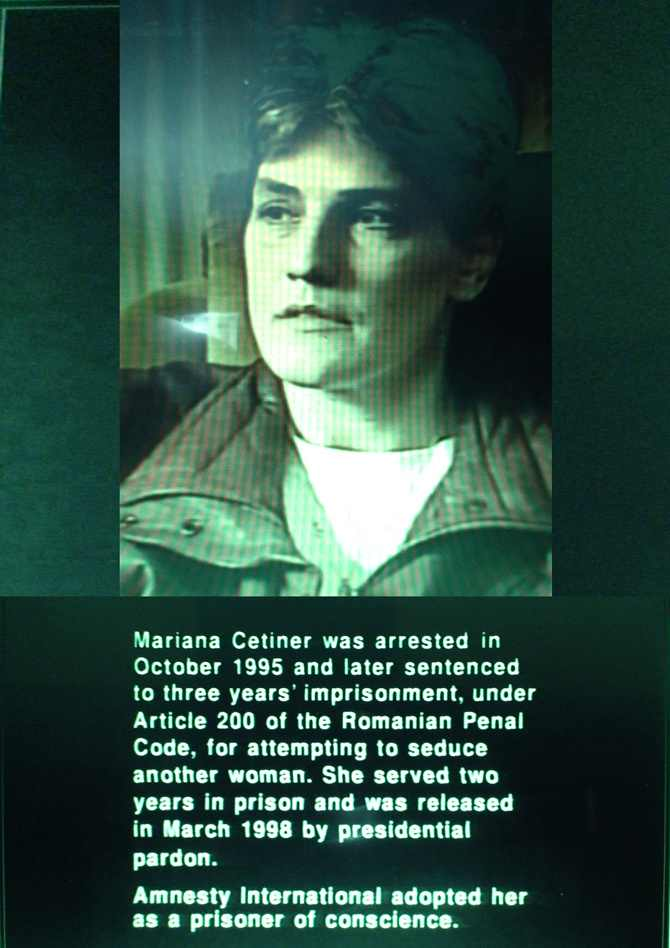
Mariana Cetiner

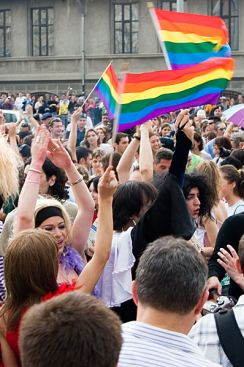
The first parade of Bucharest Pride in 2005 (then known as GayFest)

- 1993 – Ciprian Cucu (17) and Marian Mutașcu (22), two open homosexuals from Timișoara, were referred to the Police by Cucu's older sister. The two were arrested in January 1993. According to Cucu, "I was the first one to be interrogated. The investigators called me a 'whore' repeatedly...". On 9 June, both were convicted; Mutașcu received two years imprisonment, and Cucu one year. Largely due to intensive pressure from the international community, these sentences were suspended. In May 1995, Mutașcu committed suicide, due to public jesting.
- 1995 – Mariana Cetiner (b. 1957) was arrested for allegedly trying to persuade another woman (Adina Vana) to have sexual intercourse with her. She spent three years in prison until was pardoned by President Emil Constantinescu at the insistence of Amnesty International. She was the last Romanian citizen to be imprisoned under Article 200.
- 25 October 1996 – The ACCEPT organization, is founded - the first body in Romania which campaigned for LGBT rights.
- 2001 – The government adopts an emergency ordinance which repeals Article 200 of the Penal Code, in order to eliminate any discrimination on grounds of sexual orientation. The abrogation of the article was one of the conditions of EU accession.
- 2004 – ACCEPT organizes the first gay festival in Romania, under the title "Festival of Diversity", event that included a gay film festival, an exhibition of posters and photographs, book launches and public debates.
- 2005 – GayFest Bucharest takes place, the first Romanian gay pride parade. A historic event for the LGBT movement in Romania.
- 2017 – The first pride parade outside Bucharest takes place in Cluj-Napoca.
- 2018 – A referendum to establish a constitutional ban on same-sex marriage fails due to low turnout (21.1%).
- 2023 – The European Court of Human Rights rules that the Romanian state is breaching article 8 of the European Convention on Human Rights – the right to respect for private and family life – by not allowing same-sex couples to marry or register civil partnerships.

== See also ==
- LGBTQ rights in Romania
