= LGBTQ rights in Romania =

- Location of Romania (dark green) – in Europe (light green & dark grey) – in the European Union (light green) – [Legend]
- Legal status: Legal since 2002, age of consent equalised in 2002
- Gender identity: Change of legal sex allowed since 1996, following sex reassignment surgery
- Military: Gays and lesbians allowed to serve
- Discrimination protections: Sexual orientation protections since 2000 (see below)

Family rights
- Recognition of relationships: No recognition of same-sex relationships
- Adoption: –

Lesbian, gay, bisexual, transgender, and queer (LGBTQ) people in Romania face legal challenges and discrimination not experienced by non-LGBTQ residents. Attitudes in Romania are generally conservative, with regard to the rights of gay, lesbian, bisexual, and transgender citizens. In 2022, the advocacy group ILGA-Europe ranked Romania 26 out of 27 European Union (EU) countries for LGBTQ rights protection, behind all EU countries except Poland. However, in their 2026 report, Romania degraded to become the lowest ranked among all European Union countries.

In 2006, Romania was named by Human Rights Watch as one of five countries in the world that had made "exemplary progress in combating rights abuses based on sexual orientation or gender identity." However, in June 2020, it placed a blanket ban on the study of gender identity in education. The ban was struck down in December 2020 by Romania’s Constitutional Court. In April 2022, a bill passed in the Senate of Romania banning "gay propaganda" in schools. Also in April 2022, the senate passed a bill banning the discussion of homosexuality and gender identity in public spaces. It was approved by the Romanian Human Rights Commission but requires approval by the Chamber of Deputies, Romania's lower house of Parliament. The bill sparked a march by over 15,000 people in Romania's capital Bucharest in July 2022, calling for equal rights for gender and sexual minorities. The anti-LGBTQ parts of the law were removed in the final version.

There are no laws explicitly against gay citizens in Romania, aside from those that deny same-sex marriage rights. Since 2002, the age of consent has been equal for both heterosexual and homosexual sex, at 15 years of age, which was lifted to 16 in 2020 for both heterosexual and homosexual sex.

== Laws against homosexuality ==
The Penal Code promulgated by Alexandru Ioan Cuza in 1864, inspired mainly by the French Penal Code of 1810 (which, over time, had eliminated the penal discrimination of homosexuality), did not treat homosexual relations differently from heterosexual ones, and thus, homosexuality was only illegal if it was done on an unconsensual basis. Starting with 1878, the corresponding Transylvanian-Hungarian code penalised gay men only if they engaged in violent homosexual acts, such as rape or attempted rape. Likewise, Bukovina punished homosexual rape through old Austrian Article 129.

Both regions were annexed to Romania after the World War I, so Romania created a new national Penal Code. Influenced by anti-gay legislation in totalitarian fascist states, the Romanian Penal Code criminalised homosexuality in the country for the first time in 1937. This Code (as result of public debate on sexuality) banned public homosexuality only (Article 431 penalised "acts of sexual inversion committed between men or between women, if provoking public scandal"). In 1948, this "public" homosexuality was extended by a court so that it included all situations whatever public or private if "provoking scandal", thus homosexuality became de facto illegal. In the new Penal Code of the Romanian People's Republic, Article 431 toughened penalties to a minimum of two years' and a maximum of five years' imprisonment. In 1957 the "public scandal" reference was removed, and any consenting sexual intercourse between persons of the same sex was criminalised. After Nicolae Ceaușescu's rise to power, in 1968, the basic code was again revised, introducing Article 200 and moving the infraction from the public domain into the private:

1. Sexual relations between persons of the same sex shall be punished with imprisonment from 1 to 5 years.
2. Act stipulated in paragraph 1, committed against a minor, against a person unable to defend himself or to express his will, or by coercion, shall be punished with imprisonment from 2 to 7 years.
3. If the act stipulated in paragraph 2 and 3 results in serious injury of physical integrity or health, the penalty is imprisonment from 3 to 10 years, and if results in the death or suicide of the victim, the penalty is imprisonment from 7 to 15 years.
4. Inciting or encouraging a person to practice the act stipulated in paragraph 1 shall be punished with imprisonment from 1 to 5 years.

Article 200 was purposeful to Ceaușescu regime in that, since 1970, it offered a pry to strengthen social control. These restrictions under the Penal Code were strictly unique to Romania and no other European country. The restrictions only included relationships and those who considered themselves homosexual were not punished but were instead considered as mentally ill. In the early 1990s, when gay rights activists, international human rights organizations, and the European Council started to press the Romanian government to decriminalise homosexuality and ensure equal rights for all citizens, the conservative political élites and the Orthodox Church claimed that sexual minorities did not exist in Romania prior to 1989 and that homosexuality was only an undesirable product of capitalism, a lifestyle induced by the Western democracies, and not a part of the heteronormative Romanian culture. In 1995, Romania applied for EU membership. As of 1995, it was one of only three countries in Europe that still criminalised homosexuality. Due mainly to strong international pressure, in 1996, the first paragraph of Article 200 was amended and only same-sex sexual activities performed in public or considered a source of public scandal were punished by the law. The last person to be imprisoned in Romania for being gay was released in 1998. In 2000, Romania began EU accession negotiations, and the country had to demonstrate progress in harmonizing its laws with the EU legislation. In particular, Romania had to prove that sexual minority human rights were not violated by the country's policies and legislation. And the possibility of eventual entry into the European Union had a powerful effect on legal change. In January 2001, Adrian Năstase's government adopted the Emergency Ordinance no. 89/2001, which eliminated Art. 200 of the Penal Code and adjusted other articles referring to sex offences to avoid discriminatory treatment of offenders. This ordinance came into force in January 2002, after President Ion Iliescu signed the new law.

In late 2007, the right-wing Greater Romania Party proposed a law in the Senate that would ban the "propagation of ideas and manifestations by homosexuals and lesbians", designed primarily to prevent Bucharest's annual GayFest pride parade from taking place. The proposal was rejected by the Senate on 11 February 2008, with 17 votes for, 16 abstentions and 27 votes against.

== Recognition of same-sex relationships ==
In September 2023, Romania was obligated to accept legal LGBTQ+ couples. The Constitution of Romania defines the family as a freely consented marriage between spouses, without specifying their gender. Despite this, legislation in effect leaves no room for interpretation for representatives of marital status. Marriage can only be the union of one man and one woman, and a same-sex couple can not legally receive state protection as a family.

Article 48 – Family (1) The family shall be founded on a freely consented marriage between spouses, on their full equality and the right and duty of parents to ensure the upbringing, education and instruction of children.

Moreover, same-sex marriage is prohibited by the Civil Code and there is no difficulty in implementing these provisions.

Article 259 – Marriage (1) Marriage shall be a freely consented union between a man and a woman, concluded under the law.

In April 2013, the Green Party MP Remus Cernea announced a proposed law that would give same-sex marriages the same rights as heterosexual ones, prompting fierce reactions from opponents of the move. On 7 July 2013, Cernea introduced the bill in the Senate, awaiting to receive reports and approvals from the entitled Parliamentary Committees in December 2013. On 17 December 2013, the bill was rejected by the Senate with only 2 votes in favor versus 110 against. After being sent to the Chamber of Deputies, the bill was officially defeated by a vote of 298 to 4 on 11 June 2014.

On 7 June 2013, Romania had attempted to amend its Constitution to ban same-sex marriage through a commission tasked with amending it, with 15 MPs in the commission voting for, and only 3 abstentions. However, the amendment was withdrawn following both internal and international backlash.

In October 2014, Cernea once again submitted a civil partnership bill to Parliament. In April 2015, the Senate voted 49 to 8 against the bill. In December 2015, the bill arrived before the Chamber of Deputies where it was rejected once more.

A lawsuit initiated by a Romanian man seeking to have his marriage to an American man (the marriage was solemnised in Belgium, where same-sex marriage is legal) recognised came before the Constitutional Court, which consulted with the European Court of Justice on the matter. The European Court of Justice ruled in June 2018 in Coman and Others that same-sex spouses have the same right of residence if the marriage was legally performed in an EU country.

In March 2018, President of the Senate Călin Popescu-Tăriceanu and President of the Chamber of Deputies Liviu Dragnea voiced their intention to legalise civil partnerships for same-sex couples. In this regard, the National Council for Combating Discrimination introduced a bill through which heterosexual or homosexual couples who don't want or can't marry will be able to opt for the formalisation of a consensual union registered with the civil status officer. Also in 2018, Romania's highest court ruled that same-sex couples should be given the same residency rights in the country. In September 2018, the highest court ruled that same-sex couples should have the same legal rights as heterosexual couples. On 23 May 2023 the European Court of Human Rights ruled that Romania is breaching article eight of the European Convention on Human Rights by not allowing same-sex couples to marry or register civil partnerships. However, in regards to that, in November 2023, Prime-Minister Marcel Ciolacu said that Romania won't legalise either same-sex marriage or civil partnerships. A similar position was taken by Nicolae Ciucă, the president of the Senate of Romania and of the National Liberal Party.

== Adoption and family planning ==
Law no. 273/2004 on the procedure of adoption in Romania does not stipulate as a condition of the adopter to be heterosexual, so under the domestic laws a homosexual can claim to adopt a child. Furthermore, in the case of E.B. v. France (2008), the Grand Chamber of the Strasbourg Court ruled that the authorities' refusal to allow a person to adopt a child on the basis of sexual orientation creates a difference of treatment incompatible with human rights. On the other hand, Romania does not have access to the joint adoption and adoption by the second parent.

It is legal for single women, including lesbians, to access means of assisted insemination, such as IVF. In 2005, the Constitutional Court ruled that it is unconstitutional to deny medically assisted reproduction, such as IVF, to individuals or those who are unmarried.

== Gender identity and expression ==
Since 1996, it has been possible for someone who has gone through sex reassignment surgery to legally change their sex in their official documents. However, the law governing the ability of transgender persons to change their identity is vague and incomplete, resulting in inconsistency in judicial practice concerning legal recognition of gender identity. In some cases authorities denied recognition of a change in identity unless a sex-reassignment intervention had occurred. Because of the difficult legal procedure for gender recognition, it is often impossible for transgender persons to get documents reflecting their gender identity, which leads to difficulties in all services requiring identity documents (health care, transportation passes, banking services).

The law on civil registration data and the law on the procedures for identification documents offer indirect guidance on the procedure for sex change and for changes to names and identification data. Changing civil status requires a court decision based, in practice, on a certificate issued by the Institutul Național de Medicină Legală (National Institute for Legal Medicine) following an intrusive and arbitrary procedure that was developed ad hoc to fill a legal vacuum.

In June 2020, Romania's parliament passed an amendment to the education law placing a blanket ban on gender identity studies. The bill was passed without public debate and was condemned by human rights groups and universities. This included condemnation from the University of Bucharest, which stated,

"It contradicts fundamental rights guaranteed by the Romania Constitution and international conventions of which Romania is a party to. The text of the law has no scientific basis and is a blatant example of interference in education and free expression".

The ban was struck down in December 2020 by Romania’s Constitutional Court.

== Military service ==
Gay people are allowed to serve openly in the Romanian army. According to the Ministry of Defence's recruitment policy, "it is the right of every Romanian citizen to take part in the military structures of our country, regardless of their sexual orientation." Nonetheless, many – if not most – gay and lesbian members of the military choose to remain closeted in the work place due to continued fear of discrimination.

== Discrimination protections ==
In 2000, the Romanian Parliament enacted a law that explicitly outlawed discrimination on the basis of sexual orientation in a variety of fields, including employment, the provision of and access to goods and services, housing, education, health care, audiovisual programming, the justice system, other public services and social security. The law, which is among the most comprehensive in the European Union, has been successfully tested by the National Council for Combating Discrimination (CNCD), Romania's equality body, which has fined a number of individuals and firms for discriminating on the basis of sexual orientation. An example of this was when TAROM, the national air carrier, was fined for refusing to allow same-sex partners to take advantage of its discounts for couples on Valentine's Day 2005. Aside from imposing a fine, the CNCD obliged TAROM to rectify the situation.

=== Constitutional protection against discrimination ===
On 5 June 2013 a Parliamentary Committee for reviewing the Constitution voted to include sexual orientation as a protected ground against discrimination in the new Constitution. The same committee voted, the following day, to change the current marriage law form, which describes marriage as "a consensual union between spouses," to the more restrictive form, describing it "as a union between a man and a woman alone", thus banning same-sex marriage. Faced with a series of backlashes from civil society and domestic and international organizations, such as ACCEPT and Amnesty International, the committee retracted both amendments. Dozens of NGOs protested the move (to retract the Constitutional protection against discrimination on the basis of their sexual orientation) and said "members of the Committee for Constitutional Revision deny the protection for the citizens who most need it" and that "as a Member State of the European Union, it is mandatory for Romania to implement the provisions of Community law in the national legislation."

Green Party MP Remus Cernea, who is a staunch supporter of LGBTQ rights, and who has introduced a failed draft law to the Senate in order to legalise civil unions, thinks of the move as a "clear a democratic setback; Romania should now be included among the most homophobic countries in the world."

=== Hate crimes legislation ===
The Penal Code was amended in 2006 to include incitement to discrimination. The same amendment introduced discriminatory intent as an aggravating circumstance in the commission of a criminal offence. That is, the fact that a crime was motivated by homophobic bias may lead to a higher sentence. However, it is difficult to assess whether these provisions are actually applied.

=== Laws against anti-LGBTQ speech ===
In 2006, the Penal Code was amended in order to criminalise incitement to hatred and harassment on the basis of sexual orientation. However, this law has not been applied yet; indeed, public marches against homosexuality by extreme right-wing activists, containing offensive anti-gay slogans, have proceeded on several occasions without being prosecuted.

== Blood donation ==
Romania currently bans men who have had sex with men (MSM) from donating blood, due to a presumed higher risk of infection with STDs. However, in September 2007, Romania's National Council for Combating Discrimination ruled that this ban was illegal, constituting discrimination on the basis of sexual orientation and creating a "hostile, degrading, humiliating and offensive atmosphere for homosexuals." The Council, which is Romania's equality watchdog, ordered the Ministry of Health to remove the ban on MSMs donating blood. In January 2008, in order to comply with the Council's ruling, the Ministry of Health released a new law which removes the ban on men who have had sex with men from donating blood. Nevertheless, the law has not yet been implemented.

== Anti-LGBTQ incidents ==
=== 2007 Cronica Cârcotașilor incident ===
On 28 March 2007, the National Audiovisual Council gave a 10,000-lei (€3000) fine to Prima TV's primetime satire-comedy show, Cronica Cârcotașilor, for making homophobic comments. In two episodes, the show's presenters had allegedly made fun of Mircea Solcanu, an Acasă TV presenter who had come out as a gay man. The president of the National Audiovisual Council, Ralu Filip, justified the fine by stating that, "I felt it was unacceptable the way in which they made fun of a sexual orientation in this way, especially since it was about a colleague." This represents the first time an audiovisual programme has been fined for homophobia in Romania, based on Article 46 of the Audiovisual Law, which prevents programmes from containing any discrimination on the basis of race, ethnicity, gender and sexual orientation. The incident sparked off a public debate regarding homophobia and representations of LGBTQ people in the mass media. Attila Gasparik, the vice-president of the National Audiovisual Council, stated that Cronica Cârcotașilor, as well as other high-profile TV shows, will continue being held under "strict observation... because they have a very high impact, reason for which we have to be very rigorous in our monitoring."

=== 2012 incidents ===
On 7 November seven young people were assaulted in Bucharest at the National School of Political Science and Public Administration after attending an academic debate about the history of homosexuality in Romania.

=== 2013 incidents ===
On 11 February 2013, during the LGBTQ History Month, students at the George Coșbuc Bilingual High School were taught about LGBTQ issues and why they matter during an extracurricular seminar, they were told about gay pride demonstrations, and encouraged to participate in the school's activities during LGBTQ History Month. A number of parents, right-wing NGOs, and a judge have publicly protested against this initiative, and have written to the government and to the parliament and asked for these activities to cease immediately. The open letter contained complaints mostly based on religious grounds. An official inquiry into this initiative was opened.

On the evening of 20 February around 50 protesters stopped a screening of the film The Kids Are All Right at the Museum of the Romanian Peasant in Bucharest, shouting homophobic slogans and verbally attacking the theatre-goers. The screening took place as part of the LGBTQ History Month at the museum. The anti-gay group verbally assaulted film-goers calling them "beasts", "scum" and chanting "Death to the homosexuals", "We don't want you here", and "You are not Romanians." Besides the assault, militants also filmed and photographed attendants. The militants then proceeded to sing the Romanian national anthem and Christian Orthodox chants, and used religious symbols (icons) as well as fascist ones (the Nazi salutes). In 2021, the European Court of Human Rights ruled that Romania violated Article 8 and Article 11 of the European Convention on Human Rights for failing to protect the freedom of association of the filmgoers by conducting an effective investigation into the disturbances. The court also found that Romanian authorities "discriminated against the applicants on the grounds of their sexual orientation".

In another well-publicised case, CNA gave a 10,000-lei fine to Antena 1 and received a reprimand from FremantleMedia, British TV company that holds the license of X Factor worldwide, after Cheloo, judge of the Romanian edition of the show, made discriminatory statements on an openly gay Italian contestant.

== Social attitudes ==
Support for same-sex marriage (2023 poll)
1. Against (59.0%)
2. For / Indifferent (41.0%)

Although the last anti-gay law, Article 200, was repealed in 2001, societal attitudes towards gay and lesbian citizens are still quite discriminatory, particularly in rural areas. Many Romanians still think of the gay community as "sick" and although a number of associations support the rights of "sexual minorities" important Romanian institutions remain critical. Homosexuals are regarded as strange, and the Romanian Orthodox Church has publicly stated its lack of tolerance on the subject. GayFest pride marches in Bucharest have been met with significant and sometimes violent opposition from far-right groups (particularly Noua Dreaptă), even though police protected pride marchers from harm. Furthermore, Noua Dreaptă has organised "Marches for Normality" on the same day as the GayFest pride parade, with slogans against gay rights and the recognition of same-sex relationships.

Apart from Noua Dreaptă, there are a number of parties (including the Greater Romania Party, the Conservative Party and former Democratic Liberal Party) which have protested against gay festivals in Bucharest and Cluj-Napoca.

In September 2006, the British Council conducted a survey in various Romanian cities which, among other things, sought to ascertain the beliefs of Romanian young people (aged between 15 and 25) regarding LGBTQ rights. Of those surveyed, 39.1% believed that LGBTQ rights should be extended, 35.9% believed that the LGBTQ rights situation is satisfactory in Romania, while 15.6% of people stated that LGBTQ people have too many rights. 9.4% were undecided. Additionally, 71.9% of the young people surveyed stated that LGBTQ rights should be protected, indicating relatively high levels of acceptance among this demographic. A more recent research conducted by ACCEPT shows that 61% of students who have a different sexual orientation and recognise this have been physically or verbally bullied by their peers.

A Eurobarometer survey on discrimination in the European Union, conducted in late 2006, revealed that attitudes towards discrimination on the basis of sexual orientation were similar with those of other EU countries. 47% of Romanians believed that discrimination on the basis of sexual orientation was "widespread", slightly less than the EU average of 50%. Additionally, 55% of Romanians were in favor of specific measures to provide equal opportunity in employment despite sexual orientation, notably lower than the EU average figure of 66%. 67% of Romanians would agree to anonymously reveal their sexual orientation in the census, "if that could help combat discrimination in Romania," while only 16% would be totally opposed (lower than the EU average of 28%). 58% of Romanians believe that homosexuality was still a taboo in Romania, higher than the EU average of 48%, but lower than for countries such as Italy, Greece, Ireland, Austria and Sweden.

Other opinion polls have shown Romanians to be more intolerant with regard to homosexuality, including a 2003 poll conducted by Gallup for the Institute for Public Policies. In the poll, 45% of respondents said homosexuals should not be treated the same as others in society; 37% thought homosexuality should be criminalised; and 40% thought homosexuals should not be allowed to live in Romania. The Soros Foundation also conducted in June 2011 a survey where 80% of the respondents feel that there is no justification for the acceptance of homosexuality even though it has not been illegal since 2001.

Further surveys show that LGBTQ persons form a stigmatised minority group similar to other vulnerable groups such as Roma or persons living with HIV. Anti-gay prejudice and stereotypes are widespread in Romania, and it appears that expressions of homophobia remain legitimate and respectable – beyond what would be acceptable for any other minority group. However, the number of Romanians saying that they would not want a homosexual neighbour has decreased from 86% in 2001 to 61% in 2007. Homosexuality remains a social and political issue. Arguments describing homosexuality as a "vice" or a "sin against nature" are common.

On 3 April 2012, the National Council for Combating Discrimination has released its report "Perceptions and Attitudes Regarding Discrimination in Romania" with the following conclusions:

- 17% of the respondents believe sexual minorities are badly discriminated against;
- 18% of the respondents feel that homosexuals are discriminated against very little;
- 30% responded that they would feel slightly comfortable;
- 31% responded that they would not feel comfortable at all around a homosexual person;
- 40% would be equally disturbed if their children would learn from a gay teacher;
- 48% stated that they would be very disturbed if they found out that a family member was gay;
- 54% stated they would never have a meal with a homosexual;
- 63% have stated that they would be very much bothered if a same-sex person would try to make advances toward them.

On 7 November 2012, the Romanian Institute for Evaluation and Strategy released a three part study. In part II, the study notes the following level of tolerance toward homosexual persons:

- 79.7% of those questioned would not want a homosexual neighbor;
- 53% preferred that homosexuality be outlawed (compared to 62% in 2006).

The 2023 Eurobarometer found that 25% of Romanians people thought same-sex marriage should be allowed throughout Europe, and 27% agreed that "there is nothing wrong in a sexual relationship between two persons of the same sex".

=== Openness about being LGBTI ===
In a poll of approximately 3,200 people in Romania in 2019, 53% of LGBTI people reported that they were "(Almost) never open" about being LGBTI. 23% stated they were "rarely open", 18% stated they were "fairly open", and 7% stated they were "very open".

=== Violence against LGBTQ people ===
Following a survey done by ACCEPT association in 2010, the information about LGBTQ people show that:

- 68.2% of respondents had suffered various acts of discrimination or exclusion because of their sexual orientation or identity;
- >50% were insulted;
- 30% were threatened with physical violence;
- 25% were deliberately excluded or avoided;
- 25% suffered of sexual harassment;
- the proportion of women who were sexually harassed is bigger than the proportion of men, while police harassment occurs in a higher proportion for gay men;
- the streets represent the place where most of the acts of discrimination happened (49.5%), followed by gay venues (27.9%).

A 2013 survey by the European Union's Fundamental Rights Agency shows that Romania ranks third, after Croatia and Bulgaria, among the countries with the highest levels of homophobic behavior. 21% of members of sexual minorities in Romania say they were attacked or threatened with violence in the past five years. The abuses occur not only on the street but also in schools. The authors of the discrimination and violence acts come from all walks of life – neighbors, acquaintances, those responsible with enforcing the law, co-workers, teachers and classmates.

== Living conditions ==
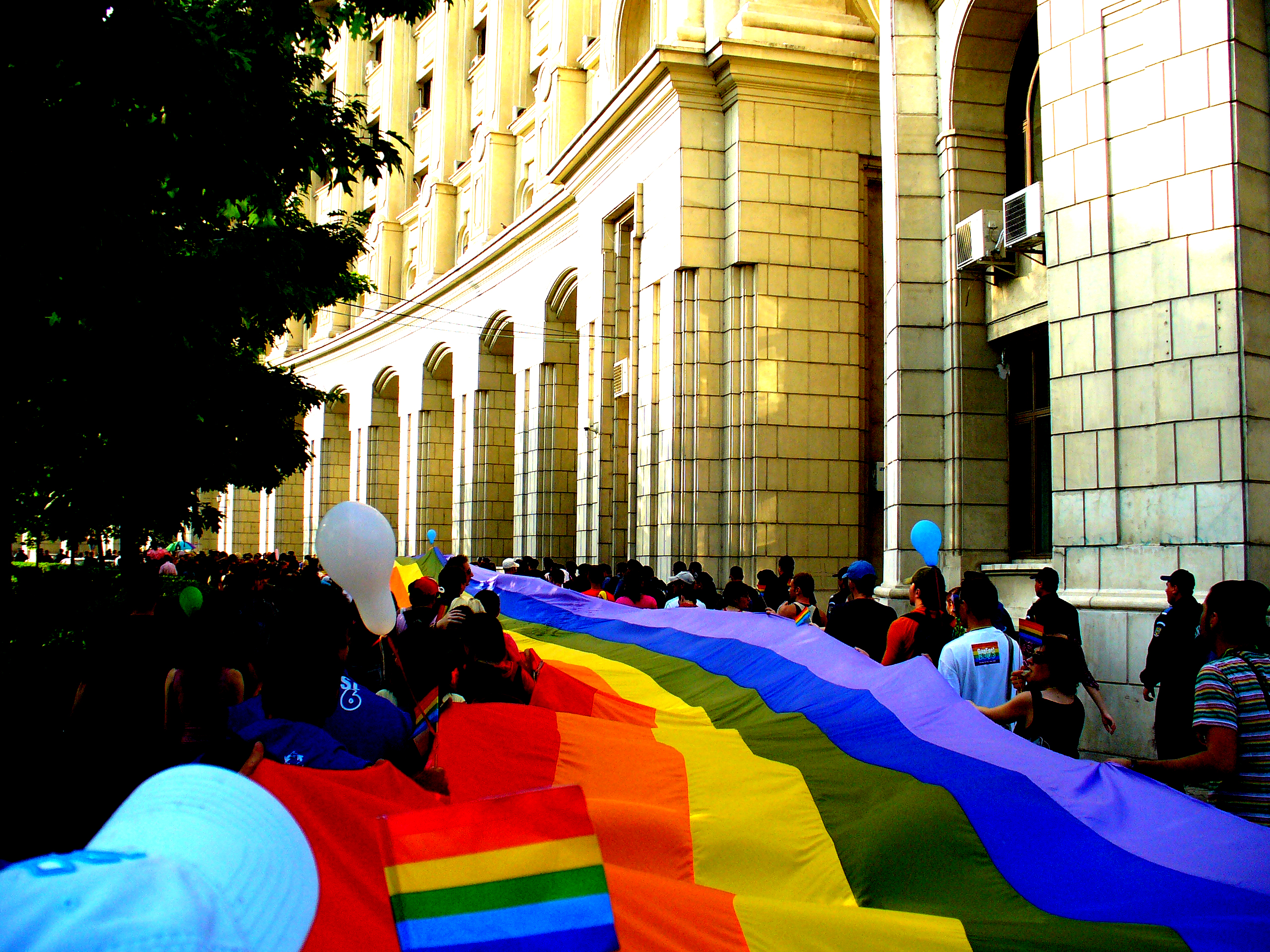
Rainbow flag displayed at the 2006 edition of GayFest, today known as Bucharest Pride

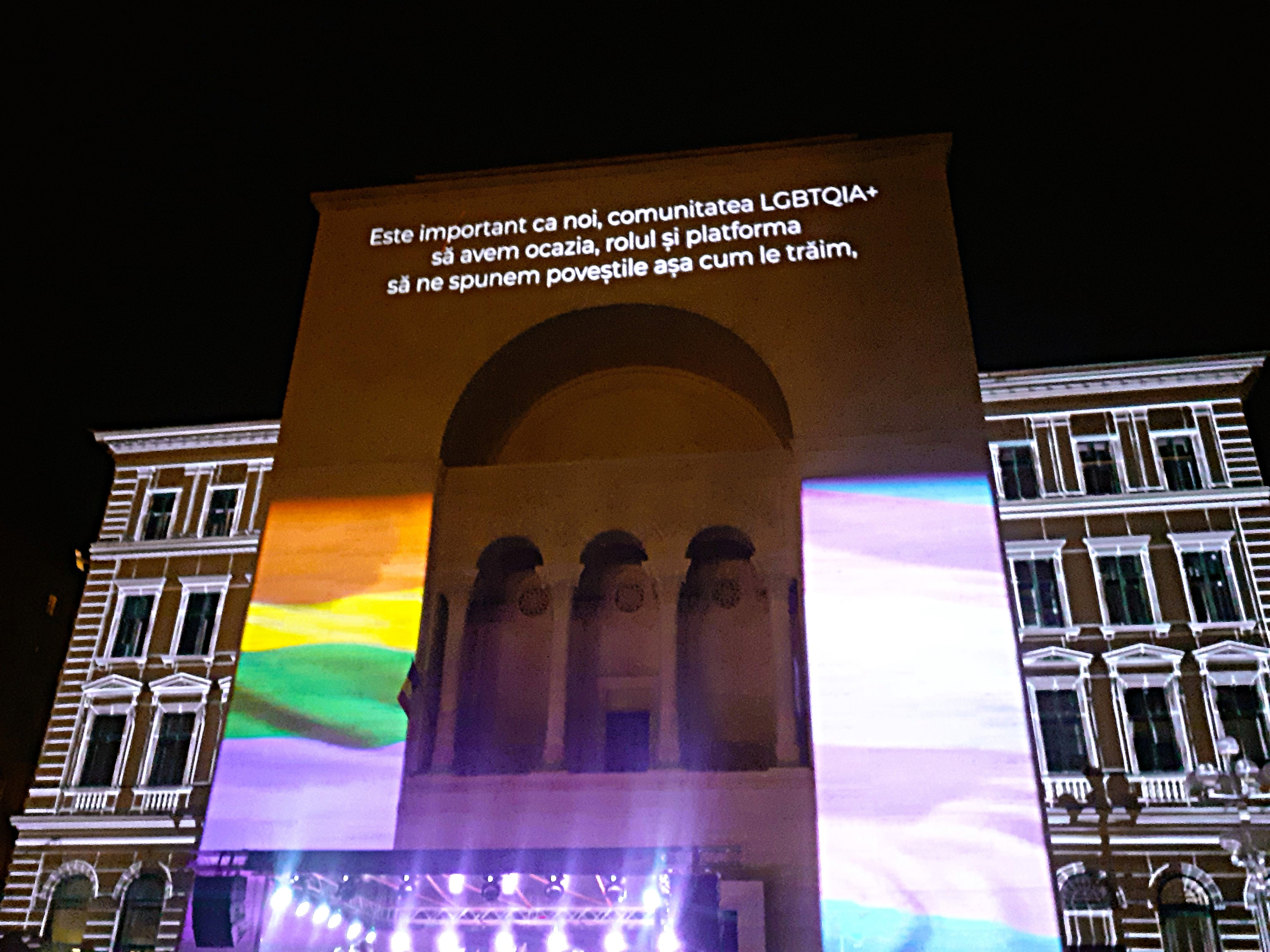
The National Opera in Timișoara lit up with the Pride rainbow flag. (2023)

Open homosexuality is still uncommon outside of major urban centers, and rural gay and lesbian Romanians typically remain closeted. The largest and most visible LGBTQ communities exist in Bucharest and in Cluj-Napoca, which have some gay clubs and cultural events.

As of 2024, annual pride parades occur in four cities: Bucharest, Cluj-Napoca, Iași and Timișoara:

- Bucharest Pride has been held in Bucharest annually since 2005. The 18th edition of Bucharest Pride attracted a record 25,000 participants and it is organised by ACCEPT, the largest organisation in Romania advocating for LGBTQ rights.
- Cluj Pride has been held since 2017 and involves a pride parade through the city centre, as well as a week-long calendar of social and cultural events. There are also several other LGBTQ events held in Cluj-Napoca by Be An Angel, another LGBTQ rights organisation. These include the annual Gay Film Nights, an international LGBTQ film festival, the Gay Prize Gala, which recognises those who have contributed to LGBTQ culture and rights, and Miss Travesty Romania, a transvestite beauty pageant.
- Iași Pride has been held since 2021 and is organised by Rise OUT. The most recent Iași Pride took place in June 2024 and attracted 2,000 participants.
- Timișoara's Pride TM was first held in 2022, organised by Identity.Education. The inaugural parade attracted hundreds of participants.

LGBTQ community pride events (such as film screenings, concerts, art exhibitions and community building events) are also held annually in Brașov, Sibiu and Oradea, although these cities have not yet hosted a pride parade.

Romania has a vibrant online LGBTQ media and blogosphere. Key online newsletters include Angelicuss and GayOne. In October 2008, Be An Angel launched Romania's first LGBTQ television channel, Angelicuss TV, which only broadcasts online. At the same time, most traditional LGBTQ media has ceased operating; there are currently no print magazines or newspapers.

In the late 2010s and early 2020s, there has been a spread of LGBTQ community organisations and events outside Bucharest to other regional centres. However, despite greater access to the active community within Bucharest through social media, a huge gap still exists in unifying regional activists with those in the capital. In 2025, a ranking published by the Brussels-based non-governmental organisation ILGA-Europe placed Romania as the worst country in the EU for LGBTQ+ people, overtaking Poland which was previously on top of the ranking for five years on a row.

== Anti-LGBT movements ==
In 2015, an alliance was formed between over 30 Romanian NGOs under the name of Coalition for Family. The coalition's main activity consisted in promoting and collecting signatures for a citizen's initiative aiming to revise the Constitution and prevent interpretations that would permit gay marriage. By May 2016 the coalition had gathered over 3 million signatures. The proposal is actively supported by the Romanian Orthodox Church. On 20 July 2016, the nine judges of the Constitutional Court ruled unanimously that the proposal to change the constitution's definition of marriage was valid. In October 2018, the referendum to define marriage as exclusively heterosexual failed. The referendum was invalid and failed due to low voter turnout; it did not reach the threshold needed.

== Summary table ==
Same-sex sexual activity legal	Yes (Since 1996)
Equal age of consent (16)	Yes (Since 2002)
Anti-discrimination laws in employment only	Yes (Since 2000; sexual orientation only)
Anti-discrimination laws in the provision of goods and services	Yes (Since 2000)
Anti-discrimination laws in all other areas (incl. indirect discrimination, hate speech)	Yes (Since 2006)
Same-sex civil unions	No
Same-sex marriages	No
Recognition of same-sex couples	No
Adoption by single LGBT individuals	Yes (Since 2023)
Step-child adoption by same-sex couples	No
Joint adoption by same-sex couples	No
Gay, lesbian and bisexual people allowed to serve openly in the military	Yes
Right to change legal gender	Yes (Since 1996, requires surgery)
Access to IVF for lesbians	Yes (Since 2005)
Commercial surrogacy for gay male couples	No
MSMs allowed to donate blood	Yes

== See also ==
- Human rights in Romania
- LGBTQ history in Romania
- LGBTQ rights in Europe
- LGBTQ rights in the European Union
- 2018 Romanian constitutional referendum
