= Antonella Lerca Duda =

Romanian activist and sex worker

- Born: 1990 (age 35–36); Iași, Romania
- Organizations: Sex Work Call; MozaiQ
- Known for: Anti-racist activism; women's rights activism; trans rights activism
- Website: lerca.ro

Antonella Lerca Duda (born c. 1990) is a Romanian activist and sex worker. She is the founder of Sex Work Call, Romania's first sex workers' rights organisation. In 2020, she ran in the Romanian local elections, becoming the country's first trans election candidate.

== Early life ==
Lerca grew up in a Roma family with seven siblings. At fourteen years old, she was forced to marry a woman, but the marriage was not consummated. She was admitted to Socola Psychiatric Hospital, where she was diagnosed with gender dysphoria. She then began hormone replacement therapy. At the age of seventeen, due to harassment, she relocated to Italy with her partner.

After relocating to Italy, Lerca and her partner worked in a vineyard until they broke up. She then moved to Venice where, because no one wanted to employ her, she turned to sex work. She sent money to her family and in 2012, she began returning to Romania once a year.

In 2018, after living in Italy for eleven years, Lerca returned to Romania to defend LGBTQ+ rights, an ambition that began while living in Italy.

== Activism ==
Since returning to Romania in 2018, Lerca has advocated for the rights of sex workers. In particular, she campaigns for intersectionality between sex workers, anti-racists, feminists, and the LGBTQ community.

In 2019, Lerca founded Sex Work Call, Romania's first association of sex workers. It is part of the International Committee on the Rights of Sex Workers in Europe. In June of the same year, Lerca organised a sex workers' rights demonstration, the first of its kind in Romanian history, in front of the Parliament. Shortly after, Romani people and sex workers were represented for the first time at a pride march.

The same year, Lerca joined Giuvlipen, a Roma feminist theatre company. She performed in Sexodrom, a play in which several Roma women recount their experiences.

Lerca is a board member for the LGBTQ organisation MozaiQ.

=== 2020 Romanian local elections ===
In 2020, Lerca ran for election in Bucharest's Sector 2. As the first trans election candidate in Romanian history, she received international media coverage and was the victim of several transphobic and racist attacks. A fundraiser was organised to help her.

Her campaign, described by Komitid as "ultra-progressive for Romania", focused on the right to housing, social protection, public services, ecology, and tackling corruption, discrimination, and violence against women (particularly public harassment and sexual violence). She also pledged construction of refuges for women with children.

However, Lerca did not receive the 1,700 signatures required to run in the election.

== See also ==
- Sex workers' rights
- LGBTQ rights in Romania
