= 2018 Romanian constitutional referendum =

- 6–7 October 2018
- Do you agree with the Law on the revision of the Romanian Constitution in the form adopted by the Parliament?
- Outcome: Referendum failed due to low turnout

Results
Choice	Votes	%
Yes	3,531,732	93.40%
No	249,412	6.60%
Valid votes	3,781,144	98.03%
Invalid or blank votes	76,111	1.97%
Total votes	3,857,255	100.00%
Registered voters/turnout	18,279,011	21.1%

A referendum took place in Romania on 6 and 7 October 2018 regarding the definition of the family in the Romanian Constitution. The referendum asked voters whether or not they approve a change to the family's definition as provided by Article 48 of the Constitution, to prohibit same-sex marriage. At the same time, a name referendum was held in the Olt County for renaming it to "Olt-Romanați County".

The referendum followed a citizens' initiative launched by Coaliția pentru Familie (the Coalition for Family) in late 2015 which gathered over three million signatures, substantially more than the 500,000 required to initiate the process for a constitutional amendment referendum. The Romanian Constitution defines the family as being founded on the free-willed marriage "between spouses" (which could also be translated as "between husbands" since in Romanian the same word is used to mean both husband and spouse of indefinite gender), but the initiative's promoters sought to amend this term with an explicit reference to marriage as a union between a man and a woman. Had the measure passed, it would have made same-sex marriage unconstitutional in the country. Romanian statute law does not permit same-sex marriage.

The referendum failed as the turnout was only 21.1%, below the required voter turnout threshold of 30%. The same thing happened in the Olt County referendum. There, the name referendum's turnout was of 27.19%.

== Background ==
The Government announced plans to hold a referendum in late 2017, following a successful citizens' initiative by a group opposed to same-sex marriage, Coaliția pentru Familie, which collected around three million signatures in support of banning same-sex marriage. The Chamber of Deputies approved the initiative on 9 May 2017, in a 232–22 vote, but no referendum took place that year.

In late March 2018, the Government announced that the referendum would be held sometime in May 2018, though it later moved the date to 10 June 2018. However, this date also passed without a referendum being held. Some Socialist lawmakers subsequently suggested that the referendum could be held in late September or early October 2018. Liviu Dragnea, President of the Chamber of Deputies, announced that the referendum could be organized on 30 September or the first Sunday in October. In early September, Dragnea announced that the referendum would take place on 7 October 2018. The initiative was approved by the Senate on 11 September 2018. On 14 September, Amnesty International, the European Commission on Sexual Orientation Law and ILGA-Europe filed a challenge with the Constitutional Court against the amendment. On 17 September 2018, the Court decided to allow the referendum to take place.

Previous referendums in Romania failed due to a requirement for a 50% turnout in order for the results to be valid. This rule was changed in 2014 and the turnout threshold was lowered, to require only 30% of registered voters to participate in the referendum and 25% of voters to cast a valid (yes/no) vote for the result to be validated.

The amendment was supported by many politicians and religious groups, but opposed by President Klaus Iohannis and the opposition Save Romania Union. The final turnout was 21.1%, below the 30% threshold necessary to make it valid. Many human rights activists called for a boycott, so as to maximise the chance of the referendum not meeting the minimum 30% turnout rate required in order for the vote to be valid. A poll conducted the week before the referendum indicated a 34% participation rate, with 90% of those participating intending to vote yes. The only question posed to appear on the ballot was whether the voter agreed with the constitutional amendment as approved by the Parliament, without the text of the amendment appearing on the ballot paper itself.

A name referendum only in the Olt County for renaming it to "Olt-Romanați County" was scheduled to coincide with the nationwide referendum. It also failed, as its turnout was of 27.19%, below the required 30%.

== Support and opposition ==
Position	Political parties	Political orientation	Ref
Support	Social Democratic Party (PSD)	Big tent	
Support	People's Movement Party (PMP)	Christian democracy Social conservatism	
Support	United Romania Party (PRU)	Romanian nationalism	
Support	Greater Romania Party (PRM)	Romanian nationalism	
Support	Ecologist Party of Romania (PER)	Green conservatism	
Support	Christian Democratic National Peasants' Party (PNȚCD)	Christian democracy	
Support	Noua Dreaptă (ND)	Clerical fascism	
Boycott	Save Romania Union (USR)	Neoliberalism; Anti-corruption	
Boycott	Green Party (PV)	Green politics	
Boycott	Romania Together Movement (RO+)	Social liberalism	
Boycott	PRO Romania (PRO)	Social democracy Social liberalism	
Boycott	Democracy and Solidarity Party (Demos)	Social democracy	
Neutral	National Liberal Party (PNL)	Conservative liberalism	
Neutral	Democratic Forum of Germans in Romania (FDGR/DFDR)	German minority politics	
Neutral	Alliance of Liberals and Democrats (ALDE)	Liberalism	
Neutral	Democratic Alliance of Hungarians in Romania (UDMR/RMDSZ)	Hungarian minority politics	

The amendment was supported by many religious groups, including neo-Protestant groups, and the Romanian Greek Catholic Church. The Romanian Orthodox Church endorsed the initiative in mid-January 2016.

Few politicians openly support civil partnerships or same-sex marriage in Romania. Exceptions include centrist-liberal President Klaus Iohannis, an ethnic German (Transylvanian Saxon), who has said that as a member of an ethnic and religious minority, he supports tolerance and openness towards others who are different while rejecting religious fanaticism and ultimatums. The opposition Save Romania Union (USR) also held an internal vote on the issue and decided to oppose the referendum. The Romania Together Movement, led by former Prime Minister Dacian Cioloș, advised its supporters not to participate in the referendum, arguing it would limit rights and freedoms.

== Results ==
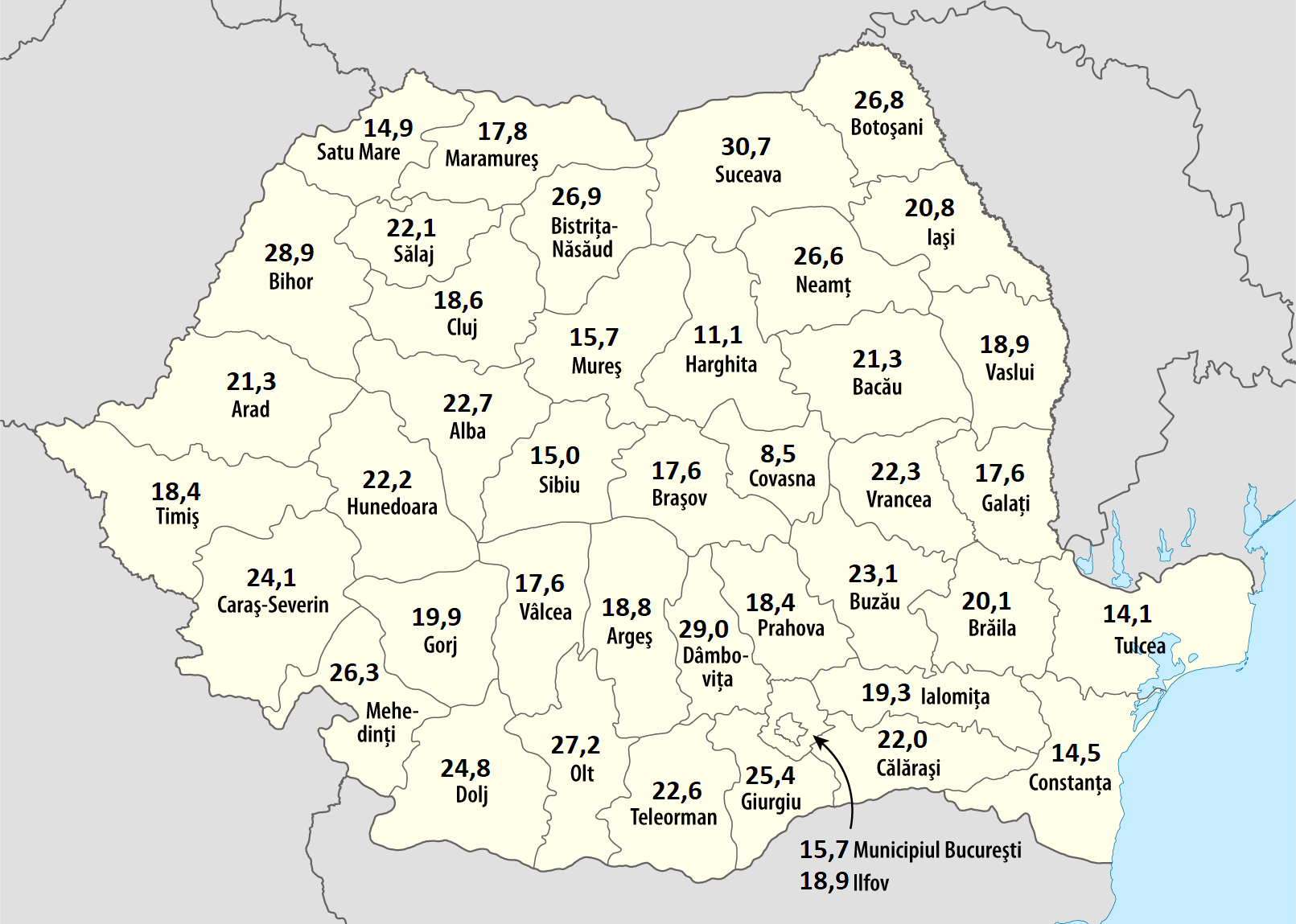
Turnout by county. The highest turnout was recorded in Suceava County, in the north of Romania, whilst Covasna County recorded the lowest.

In the morning, the turnout was low at 5.72%. Following the end of the voting period, the results of the referendum were determined on 6 October by 21:45 EEST, with Romanian election officials declaring that the referendum had failed due to a lower than required voter turnout rate of 21.1%. The lower turnout came as a surprise, with polls predicting that turnout would fall somewhere around 34%. Of those who did participate in the referendum, an overwhelming majority of more than 90% approved of the amendment.

Choice	Votes	%
For	3,531,732	93.40
Against	249,412	6.60
Total	3,781,144	100.00
Valid votes	3,781,144	98.03
Invalid/blank votes	76,111	1.97
Total votes	3,857,255	100.00
Registered voters/turnout	18,279,011	21.10
Source: BEC

== Reactions ==
Many commentators hailed the results of the referendum as being a victory for opponents of PSD leader Liviu Dragnea. Leaders of the Save Romania Union—a group which spearheaded the boycott movement—claimed that the referendum result constituted evidence that Romanians were in favour of further integration within the European Union, stating that Romania has shown it "is a tolerant and modern nation that refused in these last two days to take steps back".

Supporters of the referendum from within the governing coalition lamented that the referendum's failure represented a failure of Romanian society as a whole to partake in civic engagement. Critics within the National Liberal Party—a party whose leadership had come out in support of the referendum—further accused party President Ludovic Orban of "pushing the party into a political failure" by pursuing policies which were outdated and out of touch with contemporary social circumstances.

=== In popular media ===
In November 2018, Romanian singer Delia Matache released the single "Acadele" ("Lollipops"), which references the controversy around the LGBTQ community in Romania by repeating "Boicot, boicot" ("boycott, boycott"). She further alludes to the referendum in the line: "În dulcele stil clasic și deloc tradițional/Noi n-o ardem în plastic, noi facem totul natural" ("In the sweet classic style and not at all traditional/We don't live in plastic, we do everything naturally").

== See also ==
- LGBT rights opposition
- LGBT rights in Romania
- Recognition of same-sex unions in Romania
- 2012 Slovenian Family Code referendum
- 2013 Croatian constitutional referendum
- 2015 Slovak same-sex marriage referendum
- Irish marriage referendum, 2015
- Australian Marriage Law Postal Survey
