= Transparent (film) =

- Directed by: Jules Rosskam
- Produced by: Jules Rosskam; Anat Salomon
- Edited by: Jules Rosskam
- Distributed by: MamSir Productions
- Release date: 2005
- Running time: 61 minutes
- Country: United States
- Language: English

Transparent is a 2005 documentary film written, directed, and produced by Jules Rosskam. Its title is a play on the words “trans” and “parent” implying the invisibility of transgender parenting in society today. The documentary follows 19 transgender men from 14 different states who have given birth to, and in most cases, gone on to raise, their biological children and the challenges they face while transitioning.

The film is most well known for its viewing at the Paris's International Feminist Festival, and was featured in the September 2006 issue of Curve magazine as one of the Ten Must-See Gender Documentaries, represented as one of the best examples of New Trans Cinema alongside well-known films such as Transamerica, Boys Don't Cry and Soldier's Girl.

== Synopsis ==
Transparent follows the lives of 19 transgender men as they recall their encounters giving birth to and raising children while transitioning. For most, they did not view it as a weird concept to explain to their kids, especially at a young age, because none of the politics had to go into their explanation, they could simply state the facts and the children were accepting of that. For example, the common explanation to their children was that they were “born with a girl body but a boy heart.” In addition, they still felt as though they were their child's mother because biologically, they were, they just were no longer a mother figure. However, most of them were still being referred to by their child as “mom.”

Although most of them were in agreement about the issues discussed, the topic of how they felt during pregnancy was a little different. Some felt that it was the only time they felt right with their bodies and they enjoyed the experience overall, while others felt humiliated and like it was a slap in the face – concrete evidence this wasn't who they really were.

== Cast ==
- Matt (Los Angeles, CA)
- Ricky (Oakland, CA)
- Andrew (Butlerville, IN)
- Kosse (Westfield, MA)
- Nick (Denver, CO)
- Matthew (Topeka, KS)
- Dan (Lincoln, NE)
- Terry (Lawton, OK)
- Kim (Longmont, CO)
- Raven (Hubbardston, MA)
- Alex (DC Area)
- Rene (Ft. Collins, CO)
- Brandon (Oakland, CA)
- Jay (Dayton, OH)
- Logan (Birmingham, AL)
- Joey (Dallas, TX)
- Jarek (St. Louis, MO)
- Justin (Brooklyn, NY)
- Thomas (Weed, CA)

== Screenings ==
2009:

- Manchester Pride Film Festival

2008:

- Kansai Queer Film Festival (Japan)
- WTTW Public Broadcasting (Chicago)

2007:

- Out and Equal Workplace Summit
- Vancouver Queer Film and Video Festival
- The Netherlands Transgender Film Festival
- Fairytales Film Festival
- Athens LGBT film Festival
- Connecticut Gay and Lesbian Film Festival
- Freiburger Lesbenfilmtage
- National Women's Studies Association Conference
- Munich Women's Filmfest Bimovie
- WPIRG Rainbow Reel Film Festival
- Lesbisch Schwule Filmtage Hamburg
- Image + Nation
- Paris Lesbian Film Festival

2006:

- Hamburg International Lesbian and Gay Film Festival
- 1st annual Warsaw LGBT Film Festival
- North Carolina LGBT Film Festival
- Pink Days Amsterdam
- Paris Feminist Film Festival
- Northwestern University
- Lesgaicinemadrid Film Festival 2006
- Guelph International Film Festival
- Lisbon Gay and Lesbian Film Festival
- Glasgay! Film Festival
- Tel Aviv LGBT Film Festival
- Florence Queer Film Festival
- Inside/Out Festival Toronto
- London Lesbian and Gay Film Festival
- Hallwalls Contemporary Art Center

2005:

- Indiana Transgender Rights Advocacy Alliance
- Mardi Gras Film Festival
- The Pioneer Theater
- Reeling: Chicago LGBT Film Festival
- Outfest
- Philadelphia International Gay and Lesbian Film Festival
- NewFest
- San Francisco International Gay and Lesbian Film Festival

== Awards and nominations ==
- 1st annual Warsaw LGBT Film Festival: Best New Film
- Inside/Out Festival Toronto: Best Documentary
