= Article 200 =

Part of Romanian Penal Code

Article 200 (Articolul 200 in Romanian) was a section of the Penal Code of Romania that criminalised homosexual relationships. It was introduced in 1968, under the communist regime, during the rule Nicolae Ceaușescu, and remained in force until it was repealed by the Năstase government on 22 June 2001. Under pressure from the Council of Europe, it had been amended on 14 November 1996, when homosexual sex in private between two consenting adults was decriminalised. However, the amended Article 200 continued to criminalise same-sex relationships if they were displayed publicly or caused a "public scandal". It also continued to ban the promotion of homosexual activities, as well as the formation of gay-centred organisations (including LGBT rights organisations).

== Content ==
Until November 1996, Article 200 stated that:

1. Sexual relations between persons of the same sex are punishable by a prison term between one and 5 years.
2. The act of a major having sexual relations with a minor of the same sex is punishable by a prison term between 2 and 7 and the withdrawing of some rights.
3. Sexual relations with a person of the same sex in the impossibility of that person defending themselves or expressing their desire through constraint is punishable by a prison term between 3 and 10 years and the withdrawal of some rights.
4. If the act committed in points 2 and 3 has the result of gravely injuring the body or health, the prison term will be between five and fifteen years, accompanied by the withdrawal of some rights, and if it has the result of the death or suicide of the victim, the punishment will be a prison term between 15 and 25 years and the withdrawal of some rights.
5. The impulsion or lure of another person in the viewing of the practice of sexual relations between persons of the same sex, as well as propaganda or any other acts of proselytism committed for the same purpose are punishable with a prison term between one and 5 years.

In 1995, a local court in Sibiu asked the Constitutional Court of Romania whether the article is constitutional. In order to formulate its answer, the Constitutional Court decided to ask the religious denominations, academy, parliament and civil society groups to discuss the issue of homosexuality. All the churches which answered to the request condemned homosexuality, the Senate rejected the charges that the article is contrary to the constitution and the European Convention on Human Rights (ECHR), the academy announced that it will take time to analyse the issue, while the civil society asked for the ban to be removed.

The Constitutional Court ruled that the ban is not constitutional, "to the extent that it refers to consensual sexual relations between adults of the same sex, not taking place in public and not producing public scandal".

As a result of this ruling and of international pressure, on November 14, 1996, the first paragraph of the article was amended to read:

1. Sexual relations between persons of the same sex, committed in public or producing a public scandal, are punishable by a prison term between one and 5 years.

This amendment brought about the legalisation of homosexual activity in private, but continued to criminalise it in certain circumstances. The wording "committed in public or producing a public scandal" was added as a compromise between those who wanted to maintain homosexuality as a crime (such as parliamentarians from the Christian Democratic National Peasants' Party) and those who wanted the entire article repealed (such as the Council of Europe and human rights organisations).

The law also banned "inciting or encouraging a person to the practice of sexual relations between persons of the same sex", as well as spread of "propaganda" or "proselytism" toward homosexuality.

== Repeal ==
Article 200 was repealed due to pressure from various organisations. One key factor in its repeal was the European Union, which stated that for Romania to become a full member of the EU, all laws discriminatory to homosexuality had to be abrogated. The Council of Europe also criticised the presence of the law as a negative contributor to Romania's human rights record. Additionally, there was significant pressure from Romanian human rights and LGBT groups, particularly Accept, the largest gay rights organisation in the country.

This led to the start of the Article's repeal on 22 June 2001, when the government adopted Emergency Ordinance 89/2001 modifying the Penal Code and removing Article 200 completely. The ordinance was then sent to the two chambers of parliament for approval. The Chamber of Deputies approved the government's ordinance with 122 votes for, 63 against and 17 abstentions.

The repeal of Article 200 was then approved by the Senate's Juridical Committee on 29 August 2001, with the Senate itself debating and approving the modified version of the Penal Code on September 6. During the debate in the Senate, a secretary of state from the Ministry of Justice, Costache Ivanov, stated that Article 200 was unconstitutional, violating Article 26 of the Constitution of Romania, which protects private life. Additionally, Article 200 came into conflict with Romania's Anti-Discrimination Law of 2000, which explicitly forbids discrimination on the grounds of sexual orientation. The ordinance repealing Article 200 was approved by the Senate, with 83 votes for, 32 against and 6 abstentions.

The repeal of Article 200 was welcomed both by LGBT rights organisations as well as human rights groups in Romania and worldwide. Adrian Coman, then the executive director of Accept, the largest LGBT rights organisation in Romania, stated in an interview after the article was repealed that: "Thus has been eliminated a delicate subject that appeared on all international agendas regarding homosexuality. From a legislative point of view, Romania has chosen to respect human dignity, putting an end to a culture of fear and humiliation that its citizens of homosexual or bisexual orientation were forced to live through." Additionally, the International Lesbian and Gay Association hailed the removal of Article 200 as a "major and historic step towards the complete elimination of all laws criminalising same-sex relationships in Europe", while also stating that it was a major step towards Romania's membership of the EU.

== Opposition to the repeal ==
The repeal of the article was opposed by various groups, sparking a significant amount of controversy.

The far-right Greater Romania Party (PRM), which was the largest opposition bloc in both chambers of parliament, opposed the modification of the Penal Code, arguing that the article was already too lenient and that it was damaging national pride. The party's Senator Aron Belascu stated that this "so-called harmonisation with European legislation was a fatal error" while PRM parliamentarian Dumitru Balaiet argued that Romanians are an Eastern Orthodox people and could not accept homosexuality.

PNȚ-CD strongly opposed the repealing of the article. Its leader, Corneliu Coposu, argued that its Christian stance led it "to combat every deviation from the law of nature and from the moral principles of a future balanced society", while deputy Emil Popescu said that "incest was preferable to homosexuality since at least the former preserved the chance of procreation".

Far right-wing organisations, such as Noua Dreaptă, protested publicly at its abrogation.

Additionally, most religious organisations (including the Romanian Orthodox Church and the Roman Catholic Church in Romania) were against the law's repeal. In particular, Patriarch Teoctist of the Orthodox Church sent a letter to the parliament expressing his "grief and concern" at the intention to repeal the article, which sanctioned what he termed as "practices against nature".

== Legacy ==
The repeal of Article 200 was a significant step forward for gay rights in Romania. It also led to a greater visibility and openness of LGBT culture, with the opening of several gay clubs in Bucharest and other urban centres, as well the organisation of the first pride parade and gay festival in Bucharest, in 2005 (see GayFest). More open attitudes about homosexuality also prompted a debate over same-sex marriage in Romania, which was supported by Traian Băsescu, former president, during his presidential candidacy in the 2004 elections. Despite this, neither same-sex marriage nor any form of same-sex civil partnership are recognised in Romania as of 2019.

== See also ==
- LGBT rights in Romania
- Paragraph 175 of the German Criminal Code (banned male homosexual relationships until 1994)
- Section 28 of the United Kingdom's Local Government Act 1988 (banned the promotion of homosexuality by local governments)
