= Bucharest Pride =

Annual LGBT event in Romania

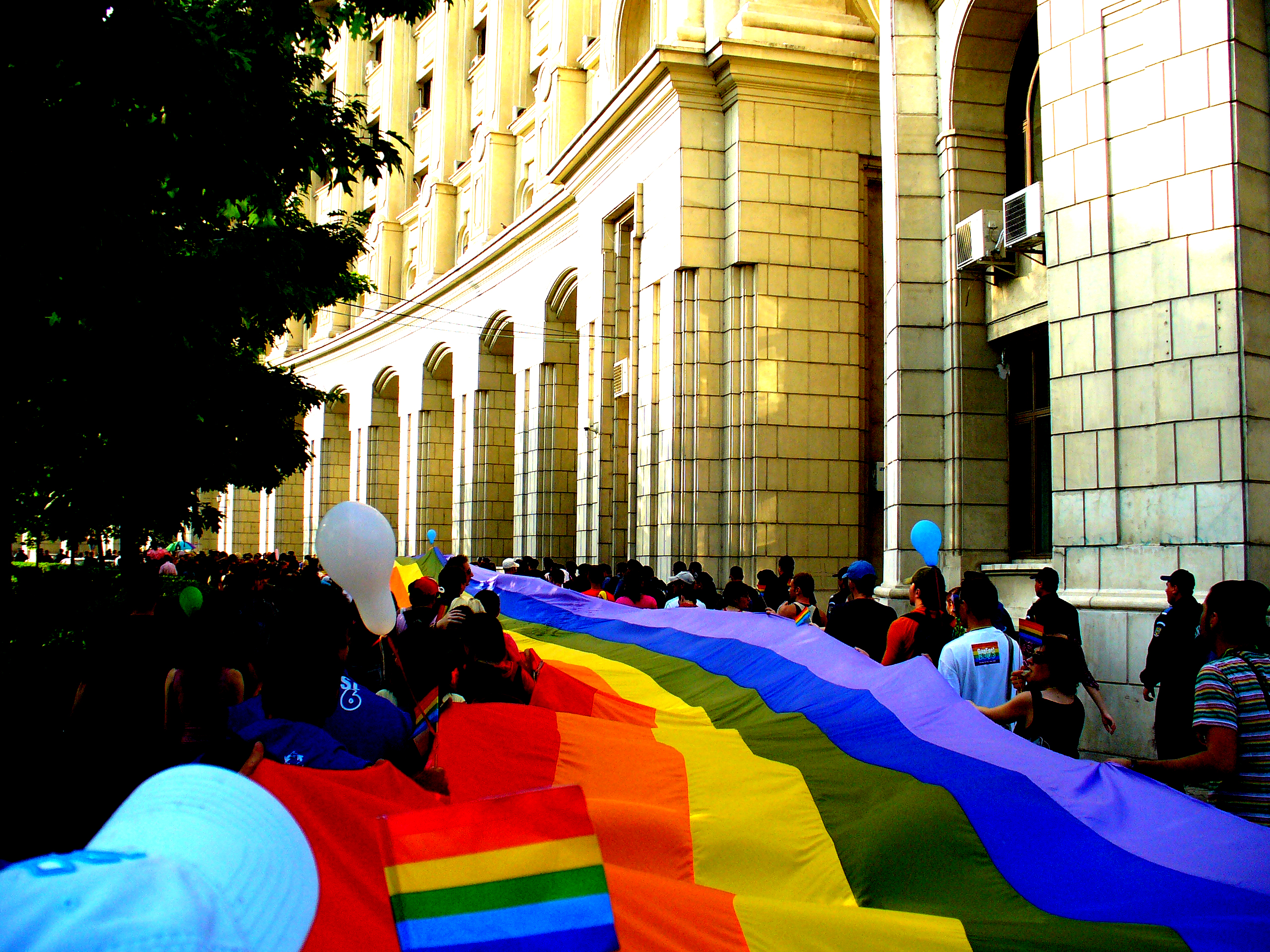
- Giant rainbow flag at the GayFest 2006 pride parade
- Status: Active
- Frequency: Annually
- Location: Bucharest
- Country: Romania
- Years active: 2004–present
- Inaugurated: 3–9 May 2004
- Most recent: 3-13 June 2026
- Attendance: ~35.000 (2026)
- Major events: Pride parade
- Organiser: ACCEPT
- Website: Official website

Bucharest Pride, known previously as GayFest, is the annual festival dedicated to LGBT rights in Romania, taking place in Bucharest for nearly a week. It first took place in 2004 and now occurs in May–June of each year, culminating with the March of Diversity (Romanian: Marșul Diversității). It is organised by the non-profit organisation ACCEPT, the country's largest lesbian, gay, bisexual and transgender (LGBT) rights organisation. The festival also receives funding from the Romanian Ministry of Health and the National Council for Combating Discrimination, as well as a number of private organisations, such as the Open Society Institute and the British Council in Romania.

Bucharest Pride features various LGBT cultural events, such as film screenings, art exhibitions, theatre and parties, as well as seminars and debates concerning LGBT social issues; since 2005 the festival has also included a gay pride parade.

== Background ==
The Romanian gay rights movement began gaining ground in the mid-1990s, after homosexual sex between two consenting adults in private was decriminalised in 1996. In the same year, Romania's first gay rights organisation, Accept, was founded in Bucharest, with two core aims: creating a better society for LGBT people in Romania, and changing negative social attitudes towards LGBT people. In the late 1990s, the LGBT rights movement was mainly concerned with lobbying for the repeal of Article 200, which continued to criminalise public displays and promotion of homosexuality. In this context, the issue of organising a gay pride festival was not viable, particularly considering that public manifestations of homosexuality could have been prosecuted under Section 5 of Article 200, which read:

The impulsion or luring of another person in viewing the practice of sexual relations between persons of the same sex, as well as propaganda or any other acts of proselytism for the same purpose are punishable with imprisonment between one and five years.

In October 2000, while Article 200 was still in force, ACCEPT hosted the 22nd European Conference of the International Lesbian and Gay Association in Bucharest. The event attracted around 100 participants from 27 countries, and created substantial dialogue and media attention about LGBT rights in Romania.

After pressure from ACCEPT as well as the European Union and the Council of Europe, Article 200 was repealed completely at the end of 2001, removing the last anti-gay law in Romania. Additionally, anti-discrimination legislation introduced in 2000 made it illegal to discriminate against people based on their sexual orientation. This permitted a greater social visibility of LGBT people and culture, with several gay clubs opening from 2002 onwards. In this context, the organisation of a gay pride festival became much more viable, with ACCEPT seeking to use these festivals in order to further enhance the visibility of LGBT people, and, particularly through an emphasis on cultural events, further its aim of changing negative social attitudes toward LGBT people in Romania.

== Editions ==
Bucharest Pride Attendance
Year	Number of attendees
2004	Not known
2005	300
2006	800
2007	500
2008	300
2009	100
2010	100
2011	150
2012	200
2013	400
2014	400
2015	1,000
2016	2,500
2017	2,000
2018	5,000
2019	10,000
2020	Cancelled due to COVID
2021	10,000
2022	15,000
2023	25,000
2024	27,000
2025	30,000
2026	~35,000

=== GayFest 2004 ===
The GayFest 2004 was, at that time, the first LGBT festival ever organised in Romania, and took place between 3 and 9 May. It was initially titled "The Diversity Festival", and had the theme of "You have the right to be diverse". The festival was mainly centred on public debates concerning attitudes towards LGBT people in Romania, as well as cultural events. Several publications on LGBT issues, such as George Bălan's Homofobia, were officially launched, and Romania's first LGBT film festival was organised, with nine films from nine countries, including a documentary about the 2001 gay pride parade in Belgrade, Serbia, which degenerated into violence. As part of the GayFest, the Goethe Institute in Bucharest hosted a photographic exhibition by Polish artist Karolina Bregula, titled Să ne vadă ("Let them see us") which explored the visibility of gays and lesbians in Poland.

According to Florin Buhuceanu, the executive director of Accept:

The idea behind the festival was to offer some transparency for the gay community in Romania. This will be a week in which we will celebrate the right to be different from the majority while at the same time having solidarity with the rest of society. Romania must show that it lives in the Europe of 2004.

The festival was publicly supported by a number of high-profile figures, such as parliamentarian Mădălin Voicu, who stated in the press that, "... we [Romanians] should adapt and realise that no more barriers exist in this domain except those imposed by decency ... Homosexuals exist in all layers of society, starting from poor people to politicians, VIPs, etc."

The 2004 Diversity Festival was initially planned to be organised with the support of the National Council for Combating Discrimination and Bucharest's Sector 3 Council, both of which later pulled out citing financial reasons, and resulting in the event being organised by ACCEPT with the support of several sponsors, including the Romanian Government, the British Council, the Goethe Institute, and the Embassy of Sweden in Bucharest.

A gay pride parade through central Bucharest was also initially planned, but was later abandoned, with various newspapers stating that Romanian society was not ready for such an event on such a scale. Ştefan Iancu, the organiser of the 2004 Diversity Festival, stated to Ziarul, on 3 May 2004, that, "We wanted to do this [a pride parade], but we don't know if we would succeed in convincing gay people to come out into the streets for various reasons. Evidently, they are too afraid of the repercussions (jobs lost, judgement from family, etc.)" Nonetheless, the next year a gay pride parade was organised as part of GayFest 2005 and was both successful and controversial.

=== GayFest 2005 ===
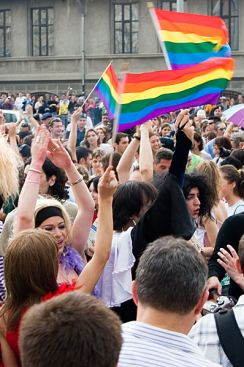
GayFest Parade 2005

The 2005 GayFest took place between 23 and 30 May, under the slogan of "You have the right to love". It sparked a significant amount of controversy in Romania, as it included the first gay pride parade in the country. Initially, the application for this parade, which took place on May 29, was rejected by the Bucharest City Hall, on the grounds that the city could not adequately provide security for the participants. Various right-wing groups, such as the nationalist Noua Dreaptă, as well as the Romanian Orthodox Church, also actively opposed the march and called for its ban.

The parade received authorisation, however, after intense lobbying from international gay rights campaigners and the National Council for Combating Discrimination, as well as public support from President Traian Băsescu and Justice Minister Monica Macovei. It proceeded successfully, with about 300 people taking part, though some sources claim that as many as 850 participants were present. A counter-demonstration, which had not received approval from the City Hall, was organised by Noua Dreaptă, the participants of which displayed anti-gay banners and violently aimed to break up the pride parade. Several members of Noua Dreaptă were arrested, and the group was subsequently fined 3,000 lei (approximately US$1,000). At the conclusion of the parade, the executive director of ACCEPT, Florin Buhuceanu, stated that:

The simple fact that the first gay festival [pride parade] took place meant a lot for us. Next time it will be more spectacular, with music and shows. People must have the courage to accept those who are different than them.

Aside from the pride parade, an LGBT film festival was organised during the GayFest week, with 13 films being shown at three venues: the Goethe Institute, La Motoare, and the Elvira Popescu Cinema. Two public debates and seminars were organised at La Scena, on the topics of homosexuality and religion, the mass media, and anti-discrimination laws.

=== GayFest 2006 ===
The 2006 GayFest took place between 30 May and 4 June, and was organised under the title of "Same rights, same responsibilities". The central theme was that of "Same-sex marriage and civil unions in Romania"; neither is currently recognised in the country. During the GayFest week, Accept called on the state to legalise same-sex marriage, or at least civil unions, creating unprecedented media coverage and debate about this issue.

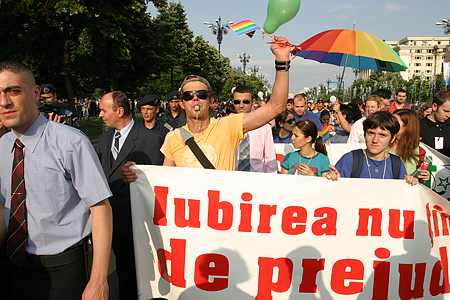
Participants holding up banners at the 2006 GayFest parade

The GayFest Parade, which received authorisation from the City Hall on 30 May, took place on 3 June, starting at 18:00 and attracting approximately 800 participants, including LGBT rights activists from Sweden, the Netherlands, and the United Kingdom. The parade included extravagant costumes, music and balloons, as well as the traditional 200-metre (626-foot) long rainbow flag that is featured at every GayFest parade. The participants also held up signs reading, "We love you!" and "Homophobia, the worst disease", while calling on the parliament to legalise same-sex marriage.

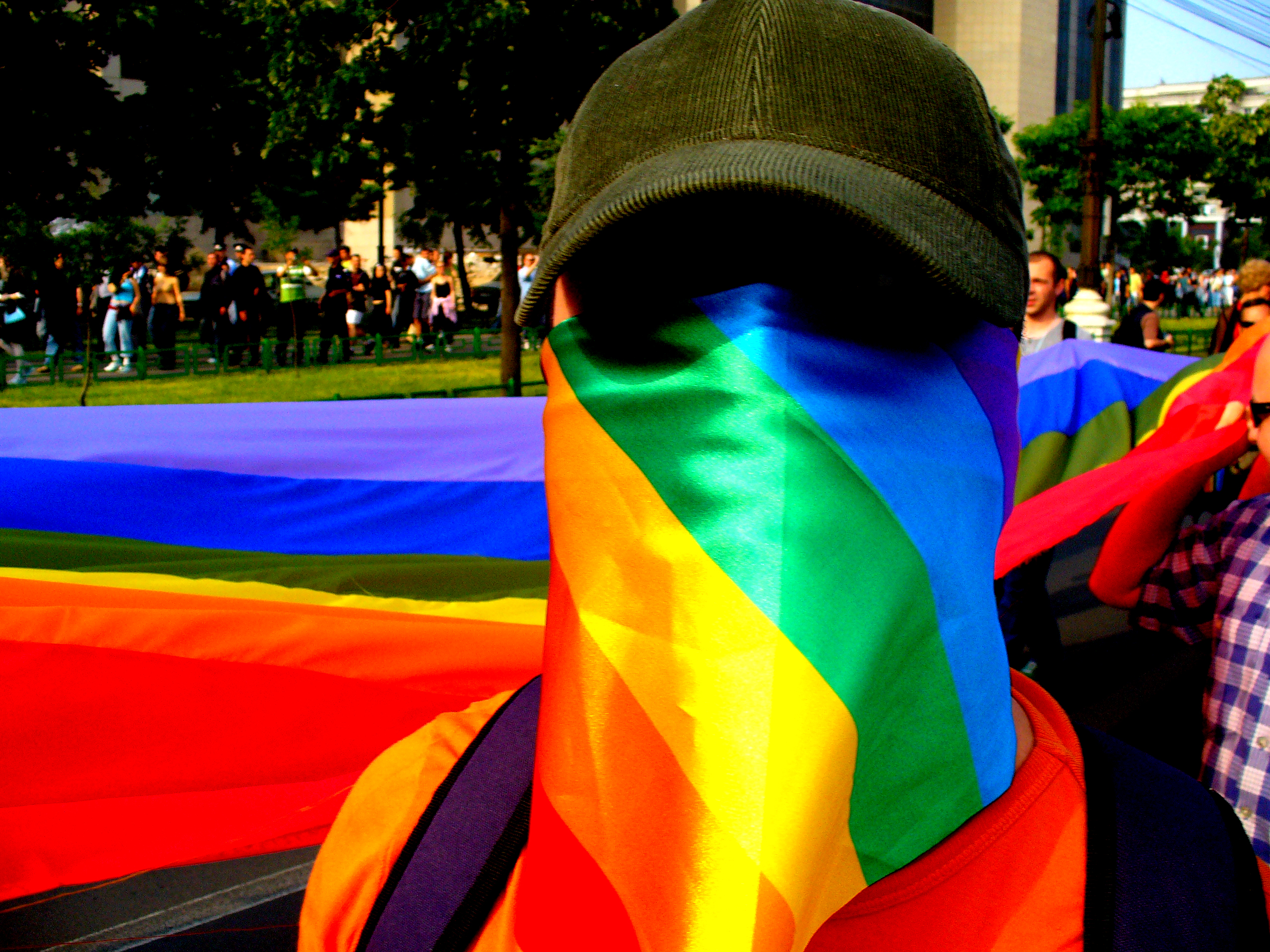
A participant at the GayFest 2006 parade, wrapped up in a rainbow flag

Alongside members of the LGBT community, the march was also attended by several supporters of civil rights and human rights, many of them heterosexual. One woman who participated in the parade stated to BBC News that:

I am here with my husband, and in case we have a child who is gay, we want him to have rights and to be happy, to have the chance to be happy in this country. I support marriage between people of the same sex. Actually, it is for that reason that we are here. I want my child to have rights in the case that he is born homosexual. And this is not a tragedy, in any case.

Like last year's event, however, the 2006 parade was not without opposition. On 20 May, twenty-two conservative NGOs, including the far right-wing Noua Dreaptă, called on the Romanian Orthodox Church to oppose the pride parade. On 2 June, the Orthodox Church denounced the City Hall for permitting the march to take place, stating that it is "an affront to the morality of public institutions, and a danger ... for the formation of young people". Additionally, Noua Dreaptă filed a legal complaint in a Bucharest court to get the march banned, arguing that it was "obscene and anti-social". The complaint was not, however, successful, with the court declaring that the GayFest Parade should take place.

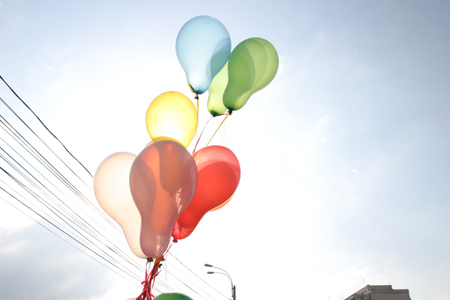
Balloons in the colours of the LGBT rainbow flag at the GayFest parade 2006

At 11:00 on 3 June, a few hours before the GayFest Parade, Noua Dreaptă conducted a counter-demonstration, attended by approximately 150 people, for "family values" and "moral traditions", parading with Christian crosses and Orthodox icons, as well as Romanian flags and posters denouncing homosexuality. Unlike in 2005, however, this march was not scheduled at the same time as the GayFest parade, and hence there were no violent clashes. Despite this, tens of protesters tried to break up the actual gay parade, clashing with the very strong police presence that shielded the LGBT activists. The protesters also held up signs reading "Romania does not need you" and threw eggs at the parade participants as well as the police. 51 anti-gay protesters were arrested and fined by police for provoking violence.

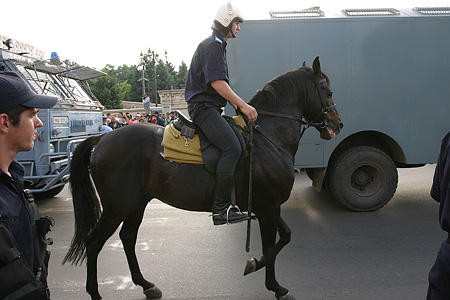
Protective police cordon at the GayFest 2006 parade

Following the parade, the organisers, ACCEPT, stated that despite the attempts by anti-gay protesters to break up the parade, they were pleased that the authorities had the situation under control, and that the number of participants in the parade was greater than expected. The two parties of the governing Justice and Truth Alliance — the Liberals and the Democrats — issued a statement after the parade condemning the violent anti-gay protests and calling for tolerance. They did not, however, comment on the issue of same-sex unions. The opposition Social Democratic Party also condemned the anti-gay violence.

A few days after the pride parade, the Cotidianul newspaper interviewed Romania's main political parties about their stance on same-sex marriage in Romania, which was the theme of the 2006 GayFest. The two governing parties of the Justice and Truth Alliance affirmed their support for gay rights, but were elusive on the issue of same-sex marriage specifically, while the Social Democrats said that they would not initiate or support a legislative proposal on same-sex marriage, but that a broader public debate on this issue is necessary, "in order to see in what way the standards regarding fundamental liberties can be improved with regard to people with another sexual orientation". The right-wing Conservatives and Greater Romania Party were opposed to same-sex marriage.

=== GayFest 2007 ===
The 2007 GayFest was held between 4 and 9 June 2007, with the theme of "Celebrate diversity! Respect rights!" The festival included a pride parade, art exhibitions and a film festival, as well as two public debates (one on discrimination and another on religion and democracy). As in 2006, the 2007 GayFest focused on the issue of same-sex marriage and partnership, provoking another public debate about the issue in the Romanian media and society. According to ACCEPT, the focus on same-sex unions was because "the adoption of legislation in this regard is a decisive step for affirming the equality of rights for all citizens"

==== Film festival ====
The 2007 GayFest included the Inklusiv Film Festival, which showcased nine feature-length international films and documentaries about LGBT issues:

- Kinsey (USA, 2005)
- Heneini (USA, 2005)
- Transparent (USA, 2005)
- Gypo (UK, 2005)
- The End of Second Class (Canada, 2005)
- Tying the Knot (USA, 2004)
- Politics of the Heart (Canada, 2005)
- Inlaws and Outlaws (USA, 2005)
- The Conrad Brothers (USA, 2006)

The festival also included seven short films, screened one after another, on the theme of "Men in privacy".

On Tuesday, June 5, the second day of the film festival, a gay couple were physically assaulted by a group of around eight people, as they were exiting the cinema where the films are shown. The police intervened rapidly and arrested the aggressors. According to a statement by the police, one of the aggressors has been charged for assault. The spokesperson of the Bucharest Police, Christian Ciocan, stated that, "The person under question was taken to the police station, where he was charged for assault and other violences, risking a prison sentence of one to three months, or a penal fine." The status of the other attackers is unknown.

==== Exhibitions ====
The 2007 GayFest included two photographic exhibitions highlighting LGBT issues. The first exhibition, Parteneri de viaţa – album de nuntă ("Partners for life – wedding album") was held at the InfoEuropa Centre and presented photographs and testimonies from the first same-sex marriages conducted in San Francisco in 2004. The photographic project, which was created by the San Francisco Queer Cultural Center and Bay Area Community of Women, sought to "transmit the idea of the universality of love, acceptance and understanding."

The Cărtureşti Bookstore also hosted a photo exhibition titled "Ce fac gayi şi lesbienele in pat?" (What do gays and lesbians do in bed?), which highlighted 16 photos from the Polish artists Rapari Team that presented the day-to-day activities of same-sex couples. The goal of the exhibition was to show that "the life of a gay individual or couple is not different from the life of a heterosexual individual or couple, and that the needs of people, indifferent of sexual orientation, are the same."

==== Pride parade ====
The GayFest pride parade was held on 8 June, between 17:00 and 19:00, on the route Boulevard Decebal-Piaţa Unirii-Parcul Izvor in central Bucharest. Although ACCEPT expected more than 1,000 people to attend, only around 500 took place, due to rain. For the first time, the parade included a series of speeches made on the subject of LGBT rights. Keynote speeches were made by Florin Buhuceanu (the vice-president of ACCEPT), Diane Fisher (a minister of the Metropolitan Community Church), Maxim Anmeghicean (representing ILGA-Europe), and Christoph Michl (from Stuttgart Gay Pride). Security at the parade was ensured by 400 gendarmes. Aside from the traditional rainbow flag, balloons and music, the participants held up signs saying "God loves us all" and "We love our gay sons and lesbian daughters"

Despite the unprecedented security, more than a hundred anti-gay protesters tried to break up the pride parade. The protesters failed to penetrate through the police cordon and, after throwing stones and firecrackers at police, they were dispersed with teargas and around 100 of them were arrested. According to Christian Ciocan, the police spokesperson, none of the participants in the pride parade was injured.

Florin Buhuceanu, the vicepresident of Accept, declared after the march:

We regret that our opponents use violence ... Police only did their job to protect an authorised march. It is our right to express our beliefs and we will not renounce in the face of violence.

Maxim Anmeghicean, the representative from ILGA-Europe, stated that, "Even since I have participated at this march I have never seen such a strong presence by the forces of law and order". He remarked that the gendarmes had acted very professionally.

A few hours before the GayFest pride parade, at 10:00 in the morning, the far-right organisation Noua Dreaptă organised a counter-demonstration against the GayFest, titled the "March for Normality". The event was attended by around 100 participants, bearing posters against same-sex marriage, Christian crosses, and fascist symbols. The Noua Dreaptă marchers were met by a group of around 20 antifascist ("antifa") protesters who shouted slogans such as "All different, all equal" and "Noua Dreaptă: Illegal", and declared that they are "protesting against the Nazist extremism which goes unpunished in Romanian society". The antifascist protesters were not affiliated to the organisers of the GayFest pride parade.

==== Reactions ====
Media reactions to the 2007 GayFest have been more positive than in previous years, with three of the largest daily newspapers, Cotidianul, Evenimentul Zilei, and Adevărul, including favourable editorials or articles about the event. Evenimentul Zilei's Andrei Crăciun argued that, through GayFest 2007, "Bucharest is preparing for a new test of normality" where "normality means the ability to accept diversity, even if you don't agree [with something]." An editorial in the same newspaper by Emilian Isaila argued that same-sex marriage should be legalised and that "God" should not play a role in this debate. Isaila stated that, "Same-sex unions should be legalised so that those with another sexual orientation can benefit from rights regarding borrowing, common ownership of goods and inheritance. And I also believe that sexual minorities in Romania have the right at least once a year to provoke debate on this issue. After all, if we want it or not, society has to integrate them."

GayFest was also covered in the HotOrNot section or the Cotidianul Weekend newspaper. The article, titled "If you're hetero[sexual], go to the gay parade", stated that, ""Participating in GayFest is hot because, aside from the fight against discrimination, it is a parade that is jolly, coloured and can be fun". At 12:00 on 9 June, ProTV, the largest private TV network in Romania, screened a short documentary titled "Gays which made history". In celebration of GayFest 2007, the show sought to inform people more about international LGBT history and issues of diversity.

Following the pride parade, Libertatea sought to investigate the opinion of the public with regard to the event. According to its findings, the majority of those interviewed saw the parade as something "perfectly normal in a democratic country". One passer-by stated, "It's good that they're expressing their views. It's their business what sexual inclinations they have. As long as they don't affect me with anything, they can do what they want. If the City Hall gave them permission to organise a meeting, why wouldn't they do it? Today, people hold meetings for everything." Another interviewee remarked, "Their manifestation doesn't affect me in any way. They can do what they want if the City Hall gave them the right. They can affirm their opinions, they can ask for their rights, since we live in a free country."

The GayFest 2007 received an official letter of support and solidarity from the organisers of Zagreb Pride, as well as from Herta Däubler-Gmelin, a member of the German Bundestag and former Justice Minister of Germany.

===== Religious groups =====
The Romanian Orthodox Church issued a statement against the pride parade on 7 June. stating that it "disapproves the manifestation in the public space of the sexual minorities...as it considers it to be an offence to the morality of public life, to the sacred institution of the family, the basis of society, and a danger for the formation of the younger generation, by exposing the youth to moral corruption."

The parade was, however, supported by the Metropolitan Community Church in Bucharest, with the church's pastor, Diane Fisher, making a keynote address.

===== Political reactions =====
GayFest 2007 did not receive an official reaction from any political party in Romania. Some politicians did, however, make homophobic comments regarding the event. Gheorghe Flutur, the vice-president of the Liberal Democratic Party, stated in a television interview that he has "a poor opinion" of LGBTQ people, and that he disapproves of the liberties they have obtained.

Radu Ţîrle, a Romanian MEP representing the Democratic Party, expressed his opposition to the gay pride parade, stating "The homosexual parade in Bucharest is a shame for Romania. It is regrettable that behind the so-called freedom of sexual orientation and freedom of opinion, the proselytism of this deviant and immoral behaviour is allowed to proliferate. The sexual orientation of anyone is a purely personal matter and its freedom is guaranteed by law, but it should not degenerate into manifestations which tend towards proselytism." Ţîrle also criticised the Bucharest City Hall for authorising the march. Ţîrle has in the past made derogatory comments about other minorities, such as the Roma, Hungarians, and religious minorities, and in December 2006 the Democratic Party voted to no longer endorse him as a candidate for the next European Parliament elections.

Gigi Becali, known for his repeated homophobic comments at previous LGBT events, stated, "I have nothing against them, but why they make a parade, I don't understand. Let them meet in the park, 300, 500 of them, to make a show. I would have nothing against it, but a parade, propaganda? It is abnormal." Becali, who is also the president of the Steaua football club, stated that he doesn't want any more homosexuals coming to Ghencea Stadium, but later appeared to contradict himself by saying "Discrimination? It's discrimination if I don't let them come. Where's the discrimination?" The National Council for Combating Discrimination announced that it will be investigating if Becali's comments breach Romania's anti-discrimination laws, which also cover speech. In a later interview, however, Becali declared, "I love them [homosexuals] in the same way that I love all other people. They can marry at the City Hall, every day, 10 of them if they want to. But in church, they don't have a place.

Corneliu Vadim Tudor, the president of the far-right Greater Romania Party, stated that public manifestations of homosexuality should be banned, because they "violate the sight, hearing and education of children" and "provoke the Church". However, he added that violence against LGBT people is a "form of barbarism", and should not be accepted under any circumstances.

=== GayFest 2008 ===
The fifth GayFest took place between 19 and 24 May 2008. It included a film festival, public art exhibitions and public discussions, as well as the traditional gay pride parade through central Bucharest. Although counterdemonstrations were organised by Noua Dreaptă and other far-right groups, there were no violent incidents at the 2008 pride parade, with very significant police presence protecting participants. However, turnout was lower than at previous events, with only around 200-300 people marching.

=== Film festival ===
The 2008 film festival component of GayFest will be the largest to date, showcasing fifteen LGBT-themed films and documentaries from around the world. A few films from the 2007 festival will also be repeated. They are:

- Finn's Girl (Canada, 2007)
- Trembling before G-d (Israel/United States, 2001)
- Un amour a taire (France, 2005)
- The Gymnast (United States, 2006)
- Les chansons d'amour (France, 2007)
- Au-dela de la haine (France, 2007)
- Monsieur Max (France, 2007)
- The End of Second Class (Canada, 2005)
- 533 Statements (Canada, 2005)
- She's a Boy I Knew (Canada, 2007)
- Heneini (USA, 2005)
- Not That Kind of Christian!! (United States, 2007)
- Daddy and the Muscle Academy (Finland, 1991)
- Dos miradas (Spain, 2007)
- Innocent (Canada/Hong Kong, 2005)

=== GayFest 2009 ===
GayFest 2009 took place between 18 and 24 May. The political theme of the 2009 GayFest was the legalisation of civil partnerships (parteneriat civil). Alongside the now-traditional gay pride parade, there was a film festival, photographic exhibitions, concerts, workshops, lectures, public debates and parties. For the first time, ACCEPT entered into a partnership with Metrorex, the operator of the Bucharest Metro, to display anti-homophobia advertising in several metro stations. During GayFest, the United Kingdom Embassy also hosted a "Diversity Barbecue" which drew together human rights activists and representatives from NGOs.

==== Pride parade ====
The GayFest pride parade closed the festival, taking place on Saturday, 23 May at 17:00. Around 200 to 300 participants took part. The parade received substantial police protection, and no anti-gay violence was reported. It was more festive than in previous years, with pop music, balloons and giant rainbow flags. Several European officials attended, including MEPs Michael Cashman, Michel Teychenné and Helene Goudin, the Ambassadors of the Netherlands, the United Kingdom, the Czech Republic and Sweden, the directors of the Polish Institute and Goethe Institute in Bucharest, and Boris Dittrich, the LGBT rights director at Human Rights Watch. During the parade, British Ambassador Robin Barnett announced that the United Kingdom supported the gay rights struggle and was pleased at the "fantastic celebration" for diversity taking place in Bucharest. The Dutch Ambassador, Jaap Louis Werner, also held a speech, stating, "We are here to show our solidarity. We know what you want. You want to be treated like normal people with the same protections before the law". Letters of support were received from the French Ambassador to Romania, as well as three openly LGBT officials from the United Kingdom: Angela Eagle, Ben Bradshaw and Chris Bryant.

A counter-march against the gay pride parade, titled "March for Family", was held on Friday, 22 May by several conservative Orthodox groups. Nevertheless, while 1000 participants were expected, less than 100 took part. Furthermore, for the first time, the Romanian Orthodox Church announced its opposition to the anti-gay march, stating that "noisy street manifestations" were incompatible with religion. The Church nonetheless expressed its continuing opposition to GayFest, arguing that it was a threat to traditional family values.

=== GayFest 2010 ===
GayFest 2010 took place successfully. Like last year, the pride parade took place without any violent incidents. For the first time, the parade received official support from the Green Party, with the Executive President of the Party, Remus Cernea, taking part, along with other high-ranking members from the party.

=== GayFest 2011 ===
The eight annual edition of Gay Fest took place between 30 May and 4 June. About 150 people participated in the parade on 4 June. US ambassador Mark Gitenstein, UK ambassador Martin Harris, Swedish ambassador Anders Bengtcen, officials of the Romanian Council Against Discrimination and of Amnesty International joined the parade. Earlier that day, far-right nationalist group Noua Dreaptă held a counter demonstration.

=== GayFest 2012 ===
About 200 people participated in the parade. British MEP Michael Cashman, US ambassador Mark Gitenstein, UK ambassador Martin Harris were there. Romanian pop singer, model and actress Loredana Groza was the ambassador of the program "Eu sunt! Tu?" (I am! You?), an LGBT program from Romania whose aim is to fight against discrimination and stigma and to prevent the HIV/AIDS.

=== GayFest 2013 ===
The tenth edition of Gay Fest took place between 3 and 8 June. The parade was held on the last day of the festival. Even though the day had started with a counter parade against homosexuals, the Gay Fest parade ended without incident. About 400 people participated in the parade, according to NGO ACCEPT, the organizer of the festival.

=== Bucharest Pride 2015 ===
Bucharest's Pride march took place on 23 May, with no significant incidents during the march. The event attracted over 1,000 participants for the first time ever.

=== Bucharest Pride 2016 ===
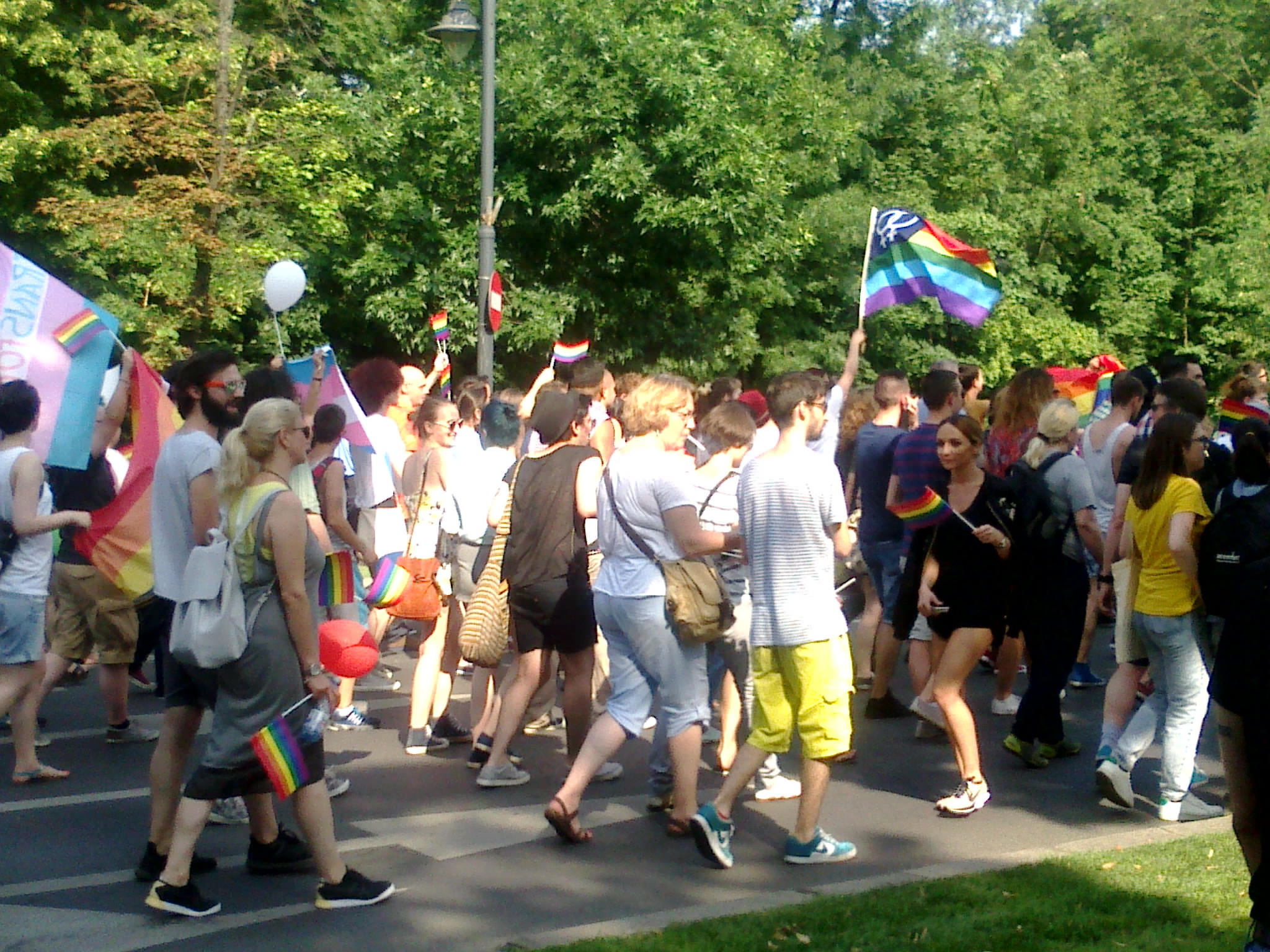
Participants marching on Kiseleff Road during Bucharest Pride 2016

The 12th edition of Bucharest Pride attracted a record 2,500 participants and unfolded under the sign of family – "The family that three million Romanians try to redefine, limiting its meaning", referring to the petition signed by three million Romanian citizens who call for the amendment of the Constitution so that marriage be defined as an exclusive reunion between a man and a woman and not between two spouses, as currently stipulated in the Constitution. Participants in the march campaigned for non-discrimination, equal rights, including the right to civil marriage, and visibility for the LGBT community. The march was attended, among others, by politician Remus Cernea and singer Andreea Bălan.

=== Bucharest Pride 2021 ===
The 2021 pride event (August 14) celebrates 20 years since the decriminalization of homosexuality in Romania. A decision by the municipality to reroute the march from its traditional route sparked protests, but following discussions mediated by UK ambassador Andrew Noble, the municipality reversed its decision and allowed the march to take place along its previous route. Under COVID-19 restrictions only 500 people are allowed to attend, but organizers expected more to show up.

The event attracted over 10,000 participants, a similar number achieved in the 2019 edition, yet a notable increase from the 2,500 participants recorded in 2016.

=== Bucharest Pride 2024 ===
The 2024 edition of the Bucharest Pride was attended by over 27.000 people. Among them were pro-Palestinians who shouted "there is no pride in genocide".

The event was attended by Greens/EFA MEP Nicu Ștefănuță.

== See also ==
- LGBT rights in Romania
- Accept
- Gay pride parade
