= Coaliția pentru Familie =

Romanian NGO association

Logo of Coaliția pentru Familie

Coaliția pentru Familie (CpF, Romanian pronunciation: [ko.aˈlit͡si.a ˈpentru faˈmili.e]; English: Coalition for Family; Hungarian: Koalíció a Családért) is an association of about 30 Romanian non-governmental organizations. It seeks to promote the traditional family, and it is also involved in the anti-abortion movement.

In 2016, the CpF gathered three million signatures in favor of replacing "spouses" with "a man and a woman" in article 48 of the Romanian constitution. Immediately after the petition was submitted to the Romanian Parliament, an open letter was published in the support of LGBT community, signed by 1000 public figures, including film producers, pop singers, people from the fashion industry, artists and intellectuals. The letter of support soon became an online petition raised over 10.000 more signatures. The American evangelical Christian organization Liberty Counsel and Alliance Defending Freedom International have both publicly supported the initiative and have submitted briefs to the Constitutional Court in support of a referendum. The Romanian Orthodox Church also announced its official support for the initiative in mid-January 2016. In July 2016, the Constitutional Court issued a unanimous ruling that allows the referendum proposal to move forward. In response, LGBT advocacy groups, like Accept, MozaiQ and TRANSform, expressed dissatisfaction with CCR’s decision, claiming that it could lead "to a rise in social tensions and hate crimes". On 20 July, 2016, right after the Constitutional Court released its decision allowing the initiative to ban gay marriage in the Constitution to move forward, the LGBT community reacted, with 50 demonstrators conducting an unauthorized protest in University Square in Bucharest.

Under Romanian law, the constitution can be changed after a proposal by the president, the government, a quarter of the members of the Parliament of Romania or at least 500,000 citizens. Parliament must then approve the revision, which must then pass a nationwide referendum. The CpF's efforts to amend the constitution have been ongoing since 2013, when Amnesty International helped defeat a similar amendment. However, it participated in a successful campaign against the introduction of civil partnerships into law. Other proposals presented by the coalition include the taxation of celibacy, the banning of adoptions by single parents and the active discouragement of sexual intercourse between unmarried persons.

The initiative was approved by the Senate on 11 September 2018 and the Romanian constitutional referendum took place on 6 and 7 October 2018, failing due to insufficient turnout.

== Controversies and criticism ==
The coalition bills itself as an independent civic initiative, unaffiliated with any religion. However, of its 43 listed members, many share strong political and religious views. Southern Poverty Law Center calls the association "a nebulous umbrella group of local rightwing organizations" and raises concerns over the involvement of other American groups, such as Alliance Defending Freedom (ADF), Liberty Counsel, World Congress of Families (WCF) and "European Center of Law and Justice" (ECLJ), who "filed legal briefs, lobbied or campaigned in favor of the change".

APOR (The Association for Parents pro Religious Courses) is at the top of the list, which successfully campaigned for religious classes in schools, and has its headquarters in the social center of The Archdiocese of Bucharest. Other religious NGOs are "Vladimir Ghika" - The Association of Romanian Catholic Families, Association Ieromonah Arsenie Boca, several Christian-Orthodox associations and Orthodox news website "Lăcașuri Ortodoxe".

Pro Vita București and Alianța Familiilor are two other notable members with a strong pro-life stance, which also favor conversion therapy treatments. An internal document from Pro Vita, which presents its political agenda for Romania, deems sexual minorities "morally inferior", and states that divorce, same-sex marriage, abortion (even for rape cases), and contraception do not pertain to the individual's private life. Pro Vita seeks to "impose authentic moral principles" based on a "God-given natural law" onto society at large, including all those who oppose their views.

The Romanian Accept and Mozaiq organizations have been highly critical of the initiative and have raised concerns about its members. Accept draws attention to the fact that Mihai Gheorghiu, who is leading the initiative group, was one of the main instigators of the 2013 "homophobic attack" at a public cinema. The U.S. Embassy has also accused Mihai Gheorghiu of organizing the protest at said location, where attendees disrupted the movie, sang religious songs and shouted "Get out!", "Death to the homosexuals!", "Shame!" and other provocative insults. It was also said that some protesters allegedly used the Nazi salute, although no evidence was presented on that matter.

Pro Vita București organisation is led by Bogdan Stanciu who also managed the Romanian branch of AlterMedia before 2007, an international extremist network founded by American white nationalist and former Ku Klux Klan Grand Wizard David Duke. Stanciu was a member of Noua Dreaptă between 2000 and 2005, a nationalist far-right organization linked to physical attacks against gays. He now denies any connections with the party. Stanciu is also the founder of the "Eurosceptic", an anti-EU and anti-immigration blog. Accept says Stanciu has close ties to Aleksandr Dugin, a Russian political scientist known for his fascist views.

Peter Costea, the founder of Alianța Familiilor, was one of the coordinators of the first initiative to amend the Constitution to define marriage as "the union between a man and a woman" in 2006. As his website states, it was done "with the help of affluent religious personalities in Romania". There are also very strong concerns about the rising hate crimes against gays and the stigmatization of the LGBT community due to the campaign against same-sex marriage. In 2019, Peter Costea and most members of Alianța Familiilor formed the National Rebirth Alliance to further oppose same-sex marriage and promote their Christian values.

Romania's president, Klaus Iohannis, the then Prime Minister Dacian Cioloș and socialist leader Liviu Dragnea have clashed over the rights of same-sex couples. In a speech in October 2016, Klaus Iohannis has called for tolerance and acceptance for minorities as the country considers banning same-sex marriage, noting he was part of two minorities as he is ethnically German and a Lutheran in a primarily Christian Orthodox country. Dacian Cioloș voiced his support for the 'traditional family', while Liviu Dragnea declared himself a religious fanatic.

On 7 October, 2016, the Parliament was set to debate a potential referendum which would see citizens vote on whether the constitution should define marriage as between a man and a woman, but decided to postpone it until after the upcoming elections.

On 19 November, 2016, the LGBT community in Bucharest organized a march with over 500 people in attendance, during the campaign for the parliamentary elections, when gay marriage became one of the debated topics. The march was named "God Doesn't Do Politics" and resulted in one of the LGBT activists who organized it receiving death threats over the phone.

47 organizations and other 2000 people have asked the Judicial Committee from the Chamber of Deputies for an alternative legal protection of couples through civil union.

In October 2017 Coaliția pentru Familie and Liberty Counsel toured Romania with Kim Davis, a county clerk from the USA jailed for repeatedly refusing to provide marriage licenses to same-sex couples, defying a court order. The CpF pushed the message that "religious persecution" would be the fate of the Romanian people if same-sex marriage was passed.
