= ACCEPT (organization) =

Romanian LGBTQ rights organization

- Formation: 25 October 1996
- Founded at: Bucharest
- Type: Non-governmental human rights organization
- Legal status: Association
- Purpose: Defense and promotion of LGBT rights as human rights
- Headquarters: Lirei Street 10, Sector 2, Bucharest
- Region served: Romania
- Methods: Pride parade; Media activism; Direct action and grassroots
- Members: ILGA-Europe, IGLYO, TGEU
- Official language: Romanian
- President: Cosmin Bebu-Vijianu
- Vice President(s): Romanița Iordache, Alexa Ciucu
- Endowment: EEA Grants, Fondul ONG
- Website: www.acceptromania.ro

ACCEPT is a non-governmental organization that advocates for the rights of gay, lesbian, bisexual, and transgender (LGBTQ) people in Romania. It is based in Bucharest and also acts as the Romanian representative at ILGA-Europe. The organisation also advocates on behalf of individuals with HIV-AIDS and carries out several programs to encourage safe sex.

ACCEPT was founded in 1996. At the time, the Article 200 from the Romanian legislation was in effect, which criminalised same-sex relationships and contributed to human rights violations, including police abuse against LGBTQ people. The main aim of ACCEPT, early in its history, was to lobby and campaign against this piece of legislation. ACCEPT had a decisive position in the repeal of Article 200 in 2001. Its role is recognized by everyone fighting for equality of LGBTs, including the European institutions, as it was awarded the 1999 EGALITE Prize in the European Commission, being also nominated for the Sakharov Prize of the same year by the European Parliament.

Since 2004, ACCEPT has also been the organizer of GayFest (known today as Bucharest Pride), the yearly Romanian gay pride festival (complete with a pride march on its closing day). The first pride march took place in 2005.

During 2005–2006, ACCEPT has published two periodical publications: Inklusiv, a bimonthly LGBTQ magazine, and ENOLA, a magazine designed for lesbians and bisexual women. Both were distributed throughout Romania (Inklusiv was free).

Since 24 March 2008, the organization has also run "INFO ACCEPT", a hotline for LGBTQ support issues such as coming out, overcoming discrimination or questions regarding sexual orientation.

== See also ==
- LGBT rights in Romania
- Same-sex marriage in Romania
- List of LGBT rights organizations
