= Jules Rosskam =

American filmmaker, artist, and educator (born 1979)

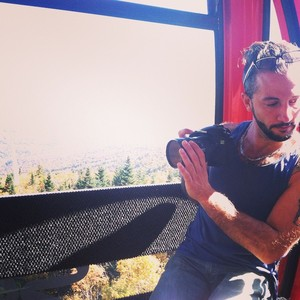
- Born: 1979 (age 46–47)
- Education: Bennington College, School of the Art Institute of Chicago
- Occupations: Filmmaker, educator
- Notable work: transparent, against a trans narrative, Paternal Rites
- Website: julesrosskam.com

Jules Rosskam is an American filmmaker, artist, and educator. His films, which include transparent (2005), against a trans narrative (2008), Thick Relations (2012), and Paternal Rites (2018), have helped shape the discussion around transgender narratives in 21st century film. Rosskam is also a noted fine artist, lecturer, and professor. He is currently assistant professor of visual arts at the University of Maryland, Baltimore County.

== Biography ==
Jules Rosskam was born in Chicago in 1979 and raised in Philadelphia. In 2001, he received a BA in Visual Arts from Bennington College before moving to New York City where he went on to develop a successful production and editing career working for MTV, The History Channel, Curious pictures, and independent artists and arts organizations like Dyke TV. In 2005, Rosskam became Dyke TV’s Executive Producer, playing a key role in organizing the award-winning cable access show for the queer community.

Rosskam premiered his first feature film, transparent, in 2005 to critical acclaim both domestically and internationally. The documentary explores the experiences of 19 transgender men across the US who have given birth. The film was acquired by Frameline Distribution in 2006, and since then has screened in over 50 film festivals and been broadcast on PBS.

In 2008, after relocating to Chicago to obtain an MFA at the School of the Art Institute of Chicago, Rosskam released his critically acclaimed second feature film, against a trans narrative. The genre-defying experimental documentary weaves interviews with performance and narrative segments, challenging dominant narratives of a monolithic transgender experience.

In 2009, Rosskam released short film Queer Teen Romance, a queer reimagining of the heartfelt after school special in collaboration with artists Sam Feder and Angelo Madsen Minax. Rosskam’s third feature film, Thick Relations (2012), blends narrative and documentary film elements to explore the interrelatedness, intimacy, mourning, joy, and ambiguity in the uncategorizable lives of a queer chosen family.

In 2018, Rosskam released his personal essay film, Paternal Rites. A study on trauma, memory, and family, Paternal Rites combines archival footage, present-day audio interviews, and animation.

Rosskam also released short film Something to Cry About, a touching and humorous documentary centered on three trans-masculine individuals having a good cry, in 2018. His most recent work, Dance, Dance, Evolution, a short documentary investigating transgender people’s shifting relationships to dance, followed in 2019.

== Filmography ==
- transparent (2005)
- against a trans narrative (2008)
- Queer Teen Romance (2009)
- Thick Relations (2012)
- Something to Cry About (2018)
- Paternal Rites (2018)
- Dance, Dance, Evolution (2019)
- Desire Lines (2024)
