= ILGA-Europe =

European LGBTQ rights organization

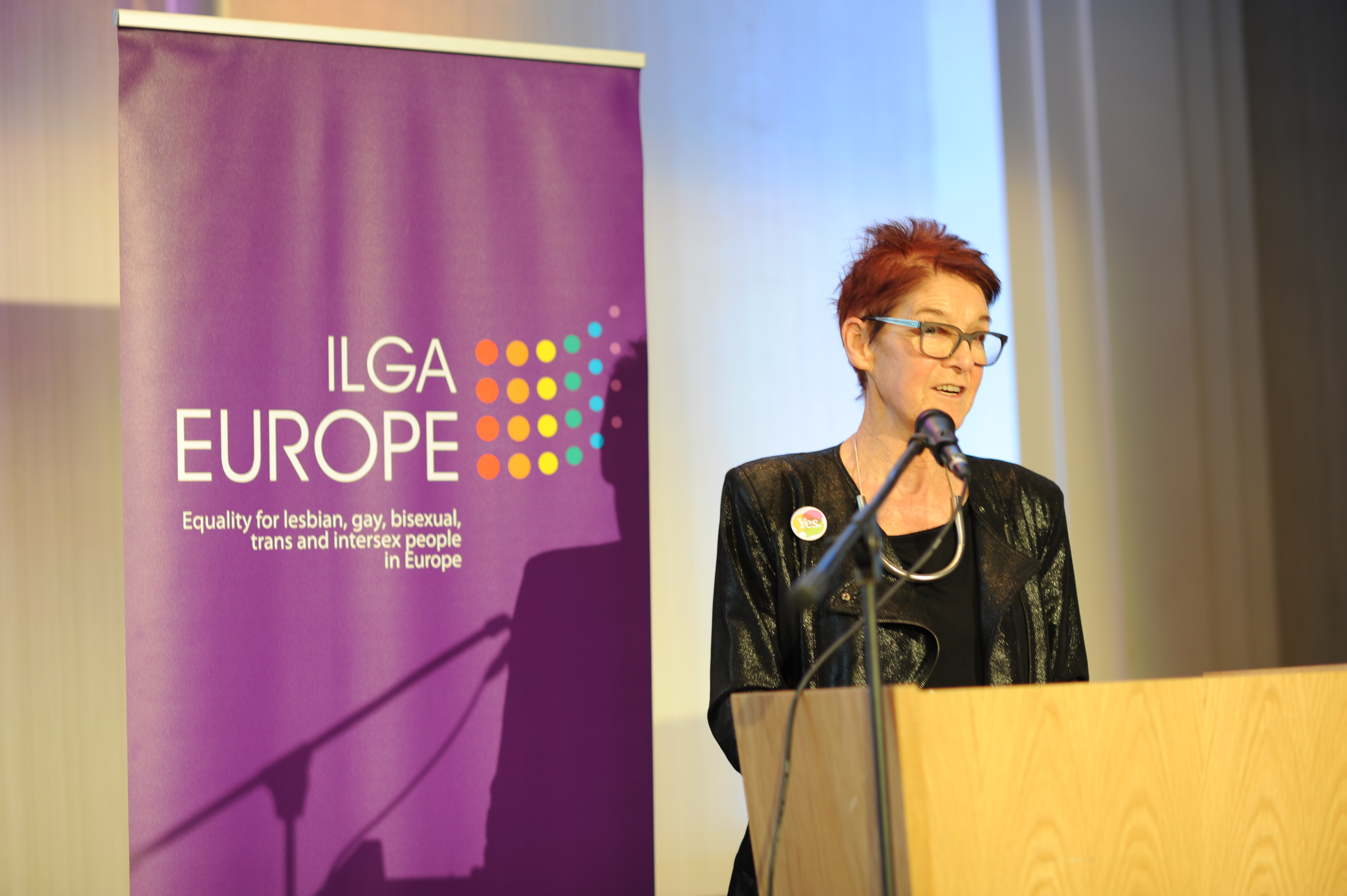
- Ailbhe Smyth at the 2018 ILGA conference
- Formation: 1996; 30 years ago
- Purpose: lesbian, gay, bisexual, trans and intersex (LGBTI) rights
- Headquarters: Brussels, Belgium
- Region served: 47 countries in the Council of Europe; Belarus, Kosovo and Central Asia
- Members: 500+ member organisations
- Executive Director: Evelyne Paradis
- Main organ: ILGA
- Staff: 24
- Website: ilga-europe.org

ILGA-Europe is the European region of the International Lesbian, Gay, Bisexual, Trans and Intersex Association (ILGA World). It is an advocacy group promoting the interests of lesbian, gay, bisexual, trans and intersex (LGBTI) people, at the European level. Its membership comprises more than 500 organisations from throughout Europe and Central Asia. The association enjoys consultative status at the United Nations Economic and Social Council and participatory status at the Council of Europe.

== History ==
ILGA-Europe was founded in 1996, when its parent organisation, the International Lesbian, Gay, Bisexual, Trans and Intersex Association, established separate regions. It took over responsibility for supporting the development of the LGBT movement in Europe including Transgender Europe, Inter-LGBT, and for relationships with the European Union, Council of Europe and the Organization for Security and Co-operation in Europe.

Initially ILGA-Europe worked entirely on the basis of volunteer resources. However, in 2001, its potential contribution to the European Union's anti-discrimination policies (established under Article 13 of the Treaty of Amsterdam) was recognised through the provision of core funding, currently through the PROGRESS Programme. This enabled ILGA-Europe to set up an office in Brussels, to recruit permanent staff, and to conduct an extensive programme of work in relation to sexual orientation discrimination within the EU Member States and the accession countries. Financial support from the Sigrid Rausing Trust, the Open Society Institute, Freedom House, the US State Department and the Ministry of Education, Culture and Science of the Netherlands allows ILGA-Europe to extend its work in areas not covered by EU funding, including Eastern Europe and Central Asia, and on transgender issues.

ILGA-Europe has hosted its annual conference at the end of October, since 2000, where member organisations elect the executive board and decide on the next year's working priorities.

== Rainbow Europe ==
Each May, ILGA-Europe releases its Rainbow Europe review, to mark the International Day Against Homophobia and Transphobia. It reviews the human rights situation and assesses what life is like for LGBTI+ people in every European country, covering discrimination, family recognition, hate speech/crimes, gender recognition, freedom of assembly, association and express, and asylum laws. Since 2016 Malta has topped the rankings; in 2021 it was rated to have 94% progress toward respect of human rights and full equality, and in 2025 sits 4 percentage points ahead of Belgium in second place. In 2025 Azerbaijan and Russia were ranked as the worst for LGBTI+ equality, scoring just 2.25% and 2% respectively, closely followed by Turkey, Armenia and Belarus. The biggest increase since the 2013 review, was that of Malta - increasing by 54 percentage points, followed by Greece with a 41-point gain. A summary of all Rainbow Europe scores since 2013 (when scores were standardised as a %) are given in the table below, as well as a comparison with the scores as released in 2013 and 2025. The most significant deterioration in LGBTI+ rights in Europe is that of the UK, that has decreased 40 percentage points from a peak of 86% in 2015. This equates to a 21 place-drop in ranking, from 1st (2013 to 2015) to 22nd.

Criticism of the ILGA Rainbow Europe report generally focuses on issues of political bias, pinkwashing and the use of subjective criteria. A major criticism is that the report focuses heavily on legal frameworks (e.g., trans rights and non-binary recognition) while not giving enough attention to the social acceptance or lived experiences of LGBTQ individuals in those countries. For instance, a country may score highly in terms of legal protections but still have prevailing societal stigma against LGBTQ individuals, as is the case with Malta and France. Critics argue that this can lead to an incomplete or misleading picture of the situation in certain countries. The ranking implies a singular, linear path of "progress" towards a Western European model of LGBTQ rights, which may not account for diverse local cultural contexts or forms of activism. By establishing a linear scale toward a "full equality" benchmark primarily achieved by Western European countries, the Index is seen as contributing to homonationalist discourses. This rhetoric presents "progressive" Western nations as superior, and "backward" Eastern nations as the homophobic "other", allowing some Western states such as France, Belgium and Denmark to instrumentalize LGBT rights to bolster their own image as modern and liberal. As ILGA-Europe frequently adds new criteria (e.g., non-binary recognition and asexual rights), a country's score might drop not because of regression, but because it hasn't kept pace with the new, higher bar for "full equality". This can lead to misleading media headlines about "falling" standards.

== International Intersex Forum ==
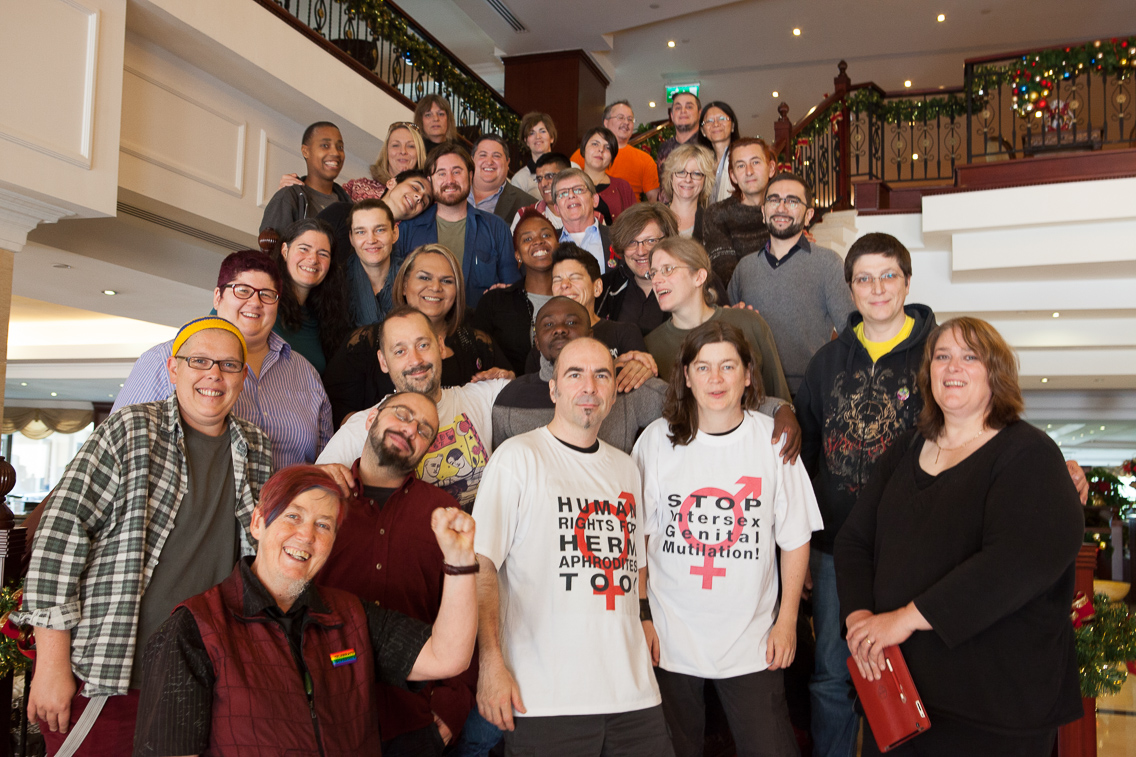
Third International Intersex Forum, Malta, December 2013

To include intersex people in its remit, ILGA-Europe and ILGA have jointly sponsored the only international gathering of intersex activists and organisations. The International Intersex Forum has taken place in Europe annually since 2011.

The third forum was held in Malta in 2013 with 34 people representing 30 organisations from all continents. The closing statement affirmed the existence of intersex people, reaffirmed "the principles of the First and Second International Intersex Fora and extend the demands aiming to end discrimination against intersex people and to ensure the right of bodily integrity, physical autonomy and self-determination". For the first time, participants made a statement on birth registrations, in addition to other human rights issues.
