= Noua Dreaptă =

New Right Noua Dreaptă
- Abbreviation: ND
- Leader: Constantin Nechita
- Founded: 2000 (as NGO); 2015 (as party)
- Headquarters: Bucharest
- Ideology: Neo-Legionarism; Romanian irredentism; Hard Euroscepticism; Anti-Hungarian sentiment; Anti-communism; Anti-Islam; Anti-Turkish sentiment; Anti-immigration; Anti-globalism; Anti-LGBT; Antiziganism
- Political position: Far-right
- Religion: Romanian Orthodox Church
- National affiliation: National Identity Bloc in Europe
- European affiliation: Alliance for Peace and Freedom
- International affiliation: World National-Conservative Movement (2015)
- Colours: Green; White
- Slogan: Orthodoxy and Nationalism
- Senate: 0 / 136
- Chamber of Deputies: 0 / 330
- European Parliament: 0 / 33
- Mayors: 0 / 3,176
- County Councilors: 0 / 1,340
- Local Council Councilors: 0 / 39,900

Party flag

Website
- nouadreapta.org

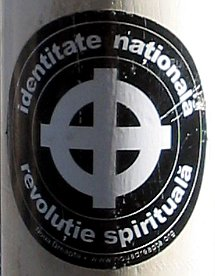
A political sticker displaying the Celtic cross and the words "identitate națională, revoluție spirituală" (national identity, spiritual revolution).

Noua Dreaptă (English: The New Right) is an ultranationalist, far-right organization in Romania and Moldova, founded in 2000. The party claims to be the successor to the far-right Iron Guard, with its aesthetics and ideology being directly influenced by the fascist movement and its leader, Corneliu Zelea Codreanu.

Proclaiming itself as "radical, militant, nationalist and Christian Orthodox", Noua Dreaptă supports a unification of Moldova and Romania.

== Beliefs ==
Former party logo

Former party flag

The group's beliefs include militant ultranationalism and strong Orthodox Christian religious convictions. Noua Dreaptă's website indicates opposition to: sexual minorities, Roma, abortion, communism, Islamism, globalization, the European Union, NATO, religious groups other than the Eastern Orthodox Church, race-mixing, territorial autonomies for Romania's ethnic Hungarian and Turkish minorities and immoderate cultural import (including some American culture, manele music, and the celebration of Valentine's Day and Halloween). They are against both Marxism and capitalism, following the third positionist ideology.

The members of Noua Dreaptă revere the leader of the Iron Guard in the 1930s, Corneliu Zelea Codreanu. Noua Dreaptă members refer to him as "Căpitanul" ("The Captain"), which is what Codreanu's supporters called him during his lifetime.

== Affiliations ==
Noua Dreaptă was part of the European National Front, an umbrella group of far-right nationalist organizations, many of which can be characterized as Fascist. The Noua Dreaptă web site includes a column of "links of interest" to numerous extreme nationalist organizations throughout Europe, including the following:

- Danskernes Parti (Denmark)
- FE-La Falange (Spain)
- National Democratic Party of Germany (Germany)
- Forza Nuova (Italy)
- Patriotic Alliance (Greece)
- National Renovator Party (Portugal)
- Renouveau Français (France)
- Srpski Obraz (Serbia)
- Nationale Alliantie (The Netherlands)
- Slovenská Pospolitosť (Slovakia)
- Mișcarea Național Creștină Moldova (Moldova)
- Nation (Belgium)
- National Revival of Poland (Poland)
- Bulgarian National Alliance (Bulgaria)
- Fiamma Tricolore (Italy)
- Russkii Obraz (Russia)

Noua Dreaptă is also reported to have had ties with the following political groups:

- Eurasian Youth Union (Russia)
- England First
- Nacionālā Spēka Savienība (Latvia)
- Jednota Slovenskej Mládeže (Slovakia)

As of 30 May 2018, Noua Dreaptă is a member of the Alliance for Peace and Freedom. The AFP is a far-right and ultranationalist European political alliance that also includes Forza Nuova, National Democratic Party of Germany, Kotleba – People's Party Our Slovakia and National Democracy among others.

== Extremist reputation ==
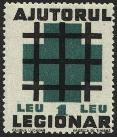
Stamp bearing the symbol of the Iron Guard over a green cross that stood for one of its humanitarian ventures.

Noua Dreaptă uses imagery associated with legionarism, the ideology of the nationalist and antisemitic interwar Iron Guard, which roughly paralleled the Fascist and Nazi movements in Italy and Germany, respectively. The group's symbol, for example—the Celtic cross (usually drawn on a green background)—is reminiscent of the insignia of the Iron Guard. Due to its imagery's uses and its methods, the party is sometimes described as neo-Nazi by news outlets.

Noua Dreaptă has aligned itself with organizations elsewhere in Europe with strongly antisemitic views, although it has not focused its efforts against Romania's currently small Jewish community. Rather, the group has concentrated its rhetoric and efforts against the ethnic Hungarians, Roma (Gypsies), sexual minorities, minority religious faiths and Turks.

Its anti-democratic and anti-constitutional views and statements made them a permanent target of surveillance by the Directorate for the Defense of the Constitution, a department of the domestic intelligence service.

== Political rallies ==
In May 2006, dozens of Noua Dreaptă members were detained by police after protesting the GayFest pride parade in Bucharest. Police also used tear gas to disperse counterprotesters led by individuals identified as Noua Dreaptă members.

On 15 March 2008, on the National Day of Hungary, Noua Dreaptă organized an anti-Hungarian rally in Cluj-Napoca — an action which, after group members attacked and beat an ethnic Hungarian celebrator, led UDMR leader Béla Markó to criticize Cluj's mayor Emil Boc for approving it. In addition, two ethnic Hungarian members of the Romanian Parliament demanded the banning of Noua Dreaptă on the grounds that it continues the Iron Guard's spirit.

Noua Dreaptă organized on 11 June 2010 a protest in front of the Serbian embassy in Bucharest. It protested over the situation of the Vlachs of Serbia, which the NGO called Romanians, in the Timok Valley region of the neighbouring country, as they were allegedly subjected to "daily abuses" and a "constant anti-Romanian policy carried out by the Serbian authorities of yesterday and today" as the organization stated.

On 4 June 2020, nationalists from Noua Dreaptă met at Arcul de Triumf in Bucharest to celebrate the Treaty of Trianon. Tudor Ionescu, the then president of the party, declared that the celebration was held while keeping in mind the Romanians abandoned after the treaty. He stated that Trianon had given Romania incomplete justice, as the country did not receive Northern Maramureș, western Crișana (Tiszántúl), western Banat and the Timok Valley.

== Electoral history ==
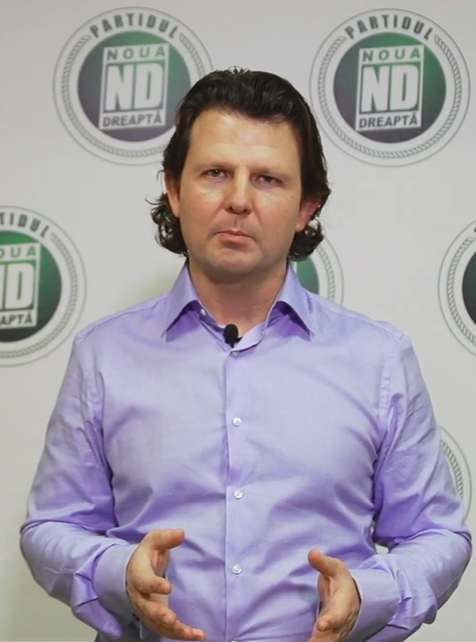
Tudor Ionescu, a former leader of Noua Dreaptă

=== Legislative elections ===
| Election | Chamber | | | Senate | | | Position | Aftermath |
| Election | Votes | % | Seats | Votes | % | Seats | Position | Aftermath |
|---|---|---|---|---|---|---|---|---|
| 2016 | did not compete | | | | | | | Extra-parliamentary opposition to PSD-ALDE government (2017–2019) |
| 2016 | did not compete | | | | | | | Extra-parliamentary opposition to PSD minority government (2019) |
| 2016 | did not compete | | | | | | | Extra-parliamentary opposition to PNL minority government (2019–2020) |
| 2020 | 3,551 | 0.06 | 0 / 329 | 4,345 | 0.07 | 0 / 136 | 29th | Extra-parliamentary opposition to PNL-USR PLUS-UDMR government (2020–2021) |
| 2020 | 3,551 | 0.06 | 0 / 329 | 4,345 | 0.07 | 0 / 136 | 29th | Extra-parliamentary opposition to PSD-PNL-UDMR government (2021–2024) |
| 2024 | did not compete | | | | | | | Extra-parliamentary opposition to PSD-PNL-UDMR government (2024–2025) |
| 2024 | did not compete | | | | | | | Extra-parliamentary opposition to PSD-PNL-USR-UDMR government (2025-present) |

=== Local elections ===
| Election | County Councilors (CJ) | | | Mayors | | | Local Councilors (CL) | | | Popular vote | % | Position |
| Election | Votes | % | Seats | Votes | % | Seats | Votes | % | Seats | Popular vote | % | Position |
|---|---|---|---|---|---|---|---|---|---|---|---|---|
| 2016 | —N/a | —N/a | 0 / 1,434 | —N/a | —N/a | 0 / 3,186 | —N/a | —N/a | 4 / 40,067 | —N/a | —N/a | N/A |
| 2020 | did not compete | | 0 / 1,340 | 984 | 0.01 | 0 / 3,176 | 2,056 | 0.03 | 2 / 39,900 | —N/a | —N/a | 73rd |

== See also ==
- Antiziganism
- Iron Guard
