= List of magazines in Romania =

In Romania some of the magazines are published by international companies such as Egmont and Axel Springer Verlag. In the country some international magazines in addition to national ones are also published, including Forbes Romania, GEO magazine and National Geographic Kids.

The following is an incomplete list of current and defunct magazines published in Romania. It also covers those magazines before the independence of the country. They may be published in Romanian or in other languages.

== A ==
- Academia Cațavencu
- Albina Românească
- Angelicuss
- Apostrof
- The Attic

== B ==
- Bilete de Papagal
- Bravo

== C ==
- Capital
- Ciao!
- Colecția de Povestiri Științifico-Fantastice
- Contemporanul
- Contimporanul
- Convorbiri Literare
- Cuvântul
- Cuvântul Liber
- Cybersecurity Trends
- Cronica Veche

== D ==
- Dacia Literară
- Dilema veche
- Dolgozó nő

== F ==
- Familia
- Făt Frumos
- Femeia
- Flacăra
- Florile Dalbe
- Formula AS

== G ==
- Gândirea
- George Lazăr
- Graiul Nostru

== I ==
- Ioana
- IT Trends

== J ==
- J'Adore

== L ==
- Luceafărul
- Lucire
- Lucru de mână

== M ==
- Magazin Istoric
- Media Expres
- Mișcarea Literară
- MyLINUX

== O ==
- Observator Cultural

== P ==
- Paloda
- Practic in bucatarie
- Punct

== R ==
- Realitatea Evreiască
- Repere Transilvane
- Revista 22
- Revista Fundațiilor Regale
- România Literară

== S ==
- Sămănătorul
- Șapte Seri
- Sburătorul
- Scrisul Nostru
- Semănătorul
- Sfera Politicii
- Simbolul
- Steaua Dunării
- Switch

== T ==
- Timpul

== U ==
- Unitárius Hírnök
- unu

== V ==
- Vatra
- Versuri și Proză
- Viața Basarabiei
- Viața Basarabiei (1907)
- Viața Medicală
- Viața Românească

== See also ==
- List of newspapers in Romania
