= Next Top Model (Romanian TV series) season 2 =

Next Top Model
- Season 2
- Season 2 cast
- Presented by: Cătălin Botezatu
- Judges: Cătălin Botezatu; Laurent Tourette; Liviu Ionescu; Mirela Vescan
- No. of episodes: 15

Release
- Original network: Antena 1
- Original release: September 15 – December 22, 2011

Season chronology
- ← Previous; Season 1 Next → Season 3

The second season of Next Top Model by Cătălin Botezatu premiered on 15 September 20, 2011, at 20:20 on Antena 1. Most of the judging panel from the previous season returned, with the exception of photographer Gabriel Hennessey. This season introduced a few notable changes: the prize package, a contract with MRA Models, increased in value from €50,000 to €70,000, and the minimum age requirement was lowered from 16 to 14, though all other participation criteria remained the same.

Applicants had to be at least 170 cm tall, between 14 and 25 years old at the time of applying, and possess a valid Romanian or Moldovan passport. Castings began on 5 May 2011 in Ploiești at the Winmarkt Grand Center and continued across more than 30 cities before concluding in Bucharest on 12 June. Out of over 8,000 applicants, only 100 advanced to the semifinal round.

Unlike the previous season, where 12 finalists were chosen, this season expanded the number to 16. Filming took place primarily in Romania throughout the summer and fall, with contestants traveling to various locations in Iceland, Turkey, and Tunisia.

The season crowned 14-year-old Laura Giurcanu from Bucharest as the winner, making her both the youngest contestant and the youngest winner in the show's history.

== Cast ==
=== Contestants ===
(Ages stated are at start of contest)

Contestant	Age	Height	Hometown	Finish	Place
Miruna Iovan	16	1.80 m (5 ft 11 in)	Bucharest	Episode 2	16–15
Iasmina Balamat	18	1.73 m (5 ft 8 in)	Severin	Episode 2	16–15
Mădălina Goian	16	1.72 m (5 ft 7 1/2 in)	Bacău	Episode 3	14
Cristina Chiriac	17	1.80 m (5 ft 11 in)	Tecuci	Episode 4	13
Denisa Hîncu	19	1.75 m (5 ft 9 in)	Craiova	Episode 5	12
Gina Tănasie	20	1.80 m (5 ft 11 in)	Sfântu Gheorghe	Episode 6	11
Simona Din	19	1.78 m (5 ft 10 in)	Râmnicu Vâlcea	Episode 8	10–9
Aida Becheanu	18	1.70 m (5 ft 7 in)	Târgovişte	Episode 8	10–9
Flori Ciupu	20	1.75 m (5 ft 9 in)	Bucharest	Episode 9	8
Iulia Micloș	21	1.73 m (5 ft 8 in)	Onești	Episode 10	7
Diana Trofin	16	1.78 m (5 ft 10 in)	Bacău	Episode 11	6
Irina Batrac	17	1.78 m (5 ft 10 in)	Mangalia	Episode 12	5
Karin Arz	19	1.73 m (5 ft 8 in)	Sibiu	Episode 14	4
Sandra Ciubotariu	17	1.73 m (5 ft 8 in)	Bacău	Episode 15	3
Iuliana Mînza	21	1.77 m (5 ft 9 1/2 in)	Chișinău, Moldova	Episode 15	2
Laura Giurcanu	14	1.80 m (5 ft 11 in)	Bucharest	Episode 15	1

=== Judges ===
- Cătălin Botezatu - Host
- Laurent Tourette - Hair stylist
- Liviu Ionescu - MRA Models
- Mirela Vescan - Makeup artist

== Episodes ==
No. overall	No. in season	Title	Original release date
13	1	"Episode 1"	15 September 2011
Castings began throughout Romania in the search of the next batch of model hopefuls. Contestants from the previous season made guest appearances throughout to inspire the applicants on their way to the crown. The judges invited a select group of 100 semifinalists from the castings back to Bucharest for a final round of interviews, and chose the final fifteen contestants. The finalists moved into the Rin Grand Hotel and were met by a surprise last minute addition to the cast in Sandra, who'd been eliminated during earlier during the week but was invited back into the competition.: Special guests: Laura Dumitru, Roxana Cristian, Mădălina Barbu, Emma Dumitrescu, Guido Dolci (Major Model Management)
14	2	"Episode 2"	22 September 2011
The models were taken to the salon for their makeovers, and later received a training on all things top model, beginning with a catwalk teach where they had to walk on an extremely narrow platform while maintaining their balance. For their weekly challenge, the contestants took part in a runway show for designer Mihai Albu, and ended their week by having their photographs taken for the season's promotional material and opening sequence. Iasmina fell ill on set and had to be rushed to the hospital. At judging, Aida received best picture. Flori, Iasmina, and Miruna landed in the bottom three, and Iasmina and Miruna were eliminated from the competition.: Featured photographer: Dragoș Trăistaru; Special guest: Mădălina Barbu
15	3	"Episode 3"	29 September 2011
The contestants received an unannounced visit from host Cătălin Botezatu, and were berated about their excessive consumption of alcohol at the hotel. They later had an acting lesson with Carmina and Gabriel Montescu. The week's photo shoot took inspiration from season 6 of America's Next Top Model, as the models had to pose nude with bald caps while covered in crystals. The models also had to participate in a funerary bridal wear runway show at a cemetery before heading into elimination. At judging, Gina received best picture. Flori and Mădălina landed in the bottom two, and Mădălina was eliminated from the competition.: Featured photographer: Mihai Stecu; Special guest: Carmina Montescu, Gabriel Montescu
16	4	"Episode 4"	6 October 2011
The contestants were taken to Arsenal Park for a boot camp themed training, and took part in a military fashion show for the parks guests. Some of the models took issue with Irina's poor attitude, after which Cătălin attempted to smooth over the tensions of the group. For the week's photo shoot the models had to pose around the grounds of the park, taking inspiration from the numerous decommissioned vehicles and equipment for an army themed session. At judging, Laura received best picture. Cristina and Irina landed in the bottom two, and Cristina was eliminated from the competition.: Featured photographer: Oltin Dogaru
17	5	"Episode 5"	13 October 2011
The remaining twelve contestants were taken to the beauty salon and for a round of treatments to groom their hair, skin, and nails. They then traveled to the city of Reykjavík in Iceland, where they had a runway teach on the side of the road before promptly boarding a tour boat for a photo shoot session wearing avant garde lingerie among the glacial landscapes as they battled against the frigid weather. They continued their stay with a sightseeing trip of Geysir Hot Springs, and later took part in a runway show for Iceland Fashion Week 2011 wearing designs by Bo Karter, Sushma Patel and Cătălin Botezatu. At judging, Irina received best picture. Denisa and Gina landed in the bottom two, and Denisa was eliminated from the competition.: Special guest: Mădălina Valahe, Bo Karter, Sushma Patel
18	6	"Episode 6"	20 October 2011
The remaining eleven contestants arrived back in Romania for the next week in the competition, and were introduced to model Elena Baguci for some serious catwalk training in light of the disappointing performances of some of the previous episodes. Irina once again became the focus of conversation, as some of the other contestants began to voice their animosity towards her. The models traveled to the Danube Delta, where Iuliana and Flori played a very distasteful prank on Irina. For their challenge, the contestants were covered in body paint for an Avatar inspired role-playing exercise. They were later treated to a night out before ending their week by boarding a pontoon boat for a photo shoot on the riverbank where they had to pose with male models. At judging, Irina received best picture. Gina and Iulia landed in the bottom two, and Gina was eliminated from the competition.: Featured photographer: Ciprian Strugariu; Special guest: Elena Baguci, Claudiu Palita
19	7	"Episode 7"	27 October 2011
The remaining ten models were flown to the Aqua Fantasy Aquapark Hotel & Spa in Turkey, for an opportunity to kick back and relax. For their challenge, they were gathered by the beach and made advertise a variety of common household products. Early the next morning the contestants traveled to the location of their next photo shoot, where they had to model metallic swimsuits on the white travertine terraces of Pamukkale. They ended their week with a nymph goddess inspired runway presentation in a pond, after which Flori revealed some troubling information about her past. At judging, Karin received best picture. Flori, Iulia, and Simona landed in the bottom three, but were all allowed to remain in the competition for one more week.: Featured photographer: Ciprian Strugariu; Special guest: Sushma Patel
20	8	"Episode 8"	3 November 2011
The models began their week with an outdoor Bollywood dance and choreography lesson from designer Sushma Patel, and later had to put their knowledge to the test in a runway challenge on a boardwalk while fitted in her traditional designs, wearing colorful saris and jewels. For the week's photo shoot the contestants traveled to the Temple of Artemis at Ephesus, and had to pose as contemporary stylish philosophers among the temple ruins. At judging, Sandra received best picture. Aida, Iulia, and Simona landed in the bottom three, and Aida and Simona were eliminated from the competition.: Featured photographer: Ciprian Strugariu; Special guest: Sushma Patel
21	9	"Episode 9"	10 November 2011
The remaining eight models took a ballroom dance lesson from choreographer Iuno Band to prepare for an upcoming bridal runway show featuring gowns designed by Laura Olteanu. Later, they participated in a second runway show for the grand opening of the new Bamboo Club nightclub, showcasing their talents in front of an audience of over 6,000 guests. For their weekly photo shoot, the contestants posed as goddesses representing the four seasons while modeling flowing dresses at a wind farm. At judging, Karin received best picture. Flori and Iulia landed in the bottom two, and Flori was eliminated from the competition.: Special guest: Iuno Band, Laura Olteanu
22	10	"Episode 10"	17 November 2011
The models traveled to Brașov, where they showcased designs by George Hojbota during an unconventional fashion show held at an insane asylum. Following the event, they enjoyed a day at the spa that included aromatic baths, massages, and various other treatments, before being taken to the town market to explore some of the local shopping delights. For their weekly photo shoot, the contestants were required to pose underwater among a variety of props. Despite receiving on-set scuba training, most models, with the exception of Karin, struggled to maintain grace underwater. At judging, Karin received best picture. Iulia and Iuliana landed in the bottom two, and Iulia was eliminated from the competition.: Featured photographer: Mihai Stetcu; Special guest: George Hojbota
23	11	"Episode 11"	24 November 2011
The remaining six contestants were invited to a lavish dinner featuring an abundance of unhealthy foods as part of a lesson designed to test their nutrition habits. Dr. Nicoleta Mândrescu attended to offer advice and tips on improving their diets. Following this, the models participated in a denim campaign photo shoot session, where they were later presented with an assortment of buckets, each containing an unpleasant surprise that had to be incorporated into their ongoing shoot. Their week continued with a runway presentation inspired by Norse mythology, in which they dressed as woodland elves and fairies. For their final challenge, they showcased their skills in a runway show at the Maritimo Shopping Center. At judging, Karin received best picture. Diana and Iuliana landed in the bottom two, and Diana was eliminated from the competition.: Featured photographer: Sebastian Enache; Special guest: Nicoleta Mândrescu, Oana Ciclovan
24	12	"Episode 12"	1 December 2011
Upon arriving at their hotel in Tunis, the remaining five contestants were met with stormy weather. They quickly took to the ocean for an intimate black and white swimwear photo shoot featuring a male model against the overcast backdrop. Following the shoot, they participated in a makeup application session with judge Mirela Vescan. The next morning, they were awakened at dawn to begin their journey to the Amphitheatre of El Jem, the filming location for the Academy Award-winning movie Gladiator. On set, the models were tasked with portraying a forbidden love story involving a Roman soldier. For their final challenge and photo shoot, the contestants boarded a replica pirate ship at Port El Kantaoui, drawing inspiration from their surroundings and costumes to get into character. At judging, Karin received best picture. Irina and Iuliana landed in the bottom two, and Irina was eliminated from the competition.: Featured photographer: Mihai Stetcu
25	13	"Episode 13"	8 December 2011
The remaining four contestants enjoyed a day of pampering at the Marhaba Thalasso and Spa, where tensions began to emerge between Karin and Sandra after Sandra raised concerns about favoritism in the competition. The group split into separate cliques with Karin and Laura on one side, and Iuliana and Sandra on the other. The models later received decorative Mehndi henna tattoos on their hands and feet ahead of their upcoming photo shoot session in the iconic town of Sidi Bou Said, where they were dressed in traditional Tunisian bridal costumes before bonding with some of the locals. They ended their week with a challenging runway presentation wearing extremely tall heels at the ruins of ancient Carthage. At judging, Iuliana received best picture. Karin and Laura landed in the bottom two, and in a surprising turn of events, neither of them was eliminated from the competition.: Featured photographer: Mihai Stetcu
26	14	"Episode 14"	15 December 2011
The models sat down with judges and photographer Mihai Stecu for a lesson on capturing their best angles and understanding various types of modeling and their relevance in the market. They then participated in a nude photo shoot at the beach, where they were covered in clay. The contestants later traveled to the desert cave dwellings of Matmata for a galactic princess photo shoot inspired by the Star Wars films, which were filmed in the area, culminating in a camel ride in the Sahara at sunset. For their third and final challenge, the models wore metallic gowns for a photo shoot under the Tamerza waterfalls. During this challenge, Sandra fell ill due to the cold and was transported to the hospital for treatment. At judging, Laura received best picture, while Karin and Sandra landed in the bottom two. Despite her strong track record throughout the competition, Karin was eliminated, leaving Iuliana, Laura, and Sandra as the final three contestants.: Featured photographer: Mihai Stetcu
27	15	"Episode 15"	22 December 2011
The final three contestants were taken to the photo studio of photographer Marius Baragan to begin building their professional modeling portfolios. Afterward, they participated in a series of runway shows at Bucharest Fashion Week, performing alongside contestants from the previous season, including the winner, Emma Dumitrescu. Following the event, they attended the after-party before heading to their photo shoot, where they were assigned the task of portraying iconic Hollywood film actresses Brigitte Bardot, Sophia Loren, and Marilyn Monroe. For their final challenge, the models arrived at the Sinaia Casino, where they reunited with some previously eliminated contestants for a choreographed couture fashion presentation inspired by the 1999 film Eyes Wide Shut. At the end of the night, Laura was declared the winner.: Featured photographer: Marius Baragan, Valentin Călinescu; Special guest: Anca Vasile, Inga Ojog, Mădălina Barbu, Emma Dumitrescu

== Results ==
Order	Episode														
Order	1 (Note: In episode 1, Sandra was added later as a surprise finalist after having been rejected during the last round of casting.)	2 (Note: In episode 2, Miruna, Iasmina, and Flori landed in the bottom three. Cătălin handed the last photograph to Flori, eliminating Miruna and Iasmina.)	3	4	5	6	7 (Note: In episode 7, Iulia, Flori, and Simona landed in the bottom three. None of them were eliminated.)	8 (Note: In episode 8, Simona, Aida, and Iulia landed in the bottom three. Cătălin handed the last photograph to Iulia, eliminating Aida and Simona.)	9	10	11	12	13 (Note: In episode 13, Laura and Karin landed in the bottom two. Neither of them was eliminated.)	14	15
1	Aida	Aida	Gina	Laura	Irina	Irina	Karin	Sandra	Karin	Karin	Karin	Karin	Iuliana	Laura	Laura
2	Flori	Laura	Diana	Iulia	Laura	Simona	Irina	Karin	Iuliana	Laura	Laura	Sandra	Sandra	Iuliana	Iuliana
3	Karin	Iuliana	Karin	Diana	Aida	Karin	Laura	Laura	Laura	Sandra	Irina	Laura	Karin; Laura	Sandra	Sandra
4	Irina	Denisa	Aida	Iuliana	Karin	Laura	Aida	Irina	Irina	Irina	Sandra	Iuliana	Karin; Laura	Karin	
5	Mădălina	Irina	Laura	Denisa	Sandra	Aida	Sandra	Iuliana	Sandra	Diana	Iuliana	Irina			
6	Miruna	Simona	Simona	Gina	Diana	Diana	Iuliana	Diana	Diana	Iuliana	Diana				
7	Iasmina	Diana	Sandra	Karin	Simona	Flori	Diana	Flori	Iulia	Iulia					
8	Iulia	Cristina	Irina	Aida	Iulia	Sandra	Flori; Iulia; Simona	Iulia	Flori						
9	Simona	Iulia	Cristina	Flori	Flori	Iuliana	Flori; Iulia; Simona	Aida; Simona							
10	Denisa	Karin	Iulia	Sandra	Iuliana	Iulia	Flori; Iulia; Simona	Aida; Simona							
11	Diana	Mădălina	Denisa	Simona	Gina	Gina									
12	Gina	Gina	Iuliana	Irina	Denisa										
13	Cristina	Sandra	Flori	Cristina											
14	Laura	Flori	Mădălina												
15	Iuliana	Iasmina; Miruna													
16	Sandra	Iasmina; Miruna													

The contestant was a separate addition later added to the cast.
The contestant was eliminated.
The contestant was part of a non-elimination.
The contestant won the competition.

== Post–Top Model careers ==
- Iasmina Balamat has taken a couple of test shots and modeled for Alexandra Calafeteanu. She retired from modeling in 2017.
- Miruna Iovan signed with MRA Models. She took a number of test shots and walked the runway for Romanitza Fashion House. She has modeled for Roxana Porumbacu, Adrian Oianu, Mihaela Drafta, Ruslan Tatyanin, Henna Journey, and appeared on magazine editorials for All Hollow #4 Summer 2013, Glamour December 2013, După Afaceri Premium ZF April 2014. Iovan retired from modeling in 2019.
- Cristina Chiriac signed with MRA Models. She took a number of test shots until retired from modeling in 2016.
- Gina Tănasie has taken a couple of test shots, modeled for Enjoy Prana by Diana, Etiquette Boutique, and walked the runway for several designers of Feeric Fashion Days 2015 such as Iulia Manciulea, Sarah Jessy Jones. She retired from modeling in 2017.
- Aida Becheanu signed with MRA Models, Mandaria Models, GFI Models in Shenzhen, Heroes Model Management in New York City, Special Management in Milan, Kult Models in Hamburg, Scoop Models in Copenhagen, Jill Models Management in Brussels, Sight Management Studio in Barcelona, Milk Management in London and Silent Models in Paris. She has walked the runway of Zeynep Tosun FW14, Matthew Miller SS15, Osman SS16, Diesel Black Gold SS16, Thomas Tait SS16, Edun SS16, Tory Burch SS16, Wanda Nylon SS16, Rodarte FW16, Ashley Williams FW16, Yigal Azrouel FW16, Simon Miller SS17, Christopher Kane SS20. She has appeared on many magazine cover and editorials including Elle March 2012, Glamour December 2012, Marie Claire Thailand January 2013, Harper's Bazaar China July 2015, L'Officiel México May 2016, Marie Claire France April 2017, Vogue China April 2019, Marie Claire Netherlands July 2019, Vogue Ukraine September 2019, Revue F/W 2019, Numéro Tokyo June 2020, Vogue Portugal July 2021. Becheanu has also modeled for Topshop, Hugo Boss, Christopher Kane, MAC Cosmetics, Charles & Keith, Stella McCartney, Christopher John Rogers, Urban Outfitters, Hillier Bartley, Charlie May, Les Girls Les Boys, DSM Jewellery, Justine Clenquet, Barbara Bui pre-Fall 2017, Pringle of Scotland S/S 2019, Vivienne Westwood A/W 2020, Carmen March S/S 2020.
- Simona Din signed with MRA Models, Ice Model Management in Istanbul, M&A Model Agency and Chicface Models in Shenzhen. She took a number of test shots and walked the runway of Kinga Varga, Irina Schrotter, Stephan Pelger, Lena Criveanu, Cătălin Botezatu, Beijing Fashion Week 2015. She has appeared on magazine editorials for Make-Up, Luxury November 2011, The One December 2011, Unica December 2011, Tabu March 2012, Marie Claire May 2012, Femeia March 2013, Glamour February 2014, iMute #5 February 2014, Cosmopolitan October 2014, Beau Monde January 2016, Elle September 2019. Din has modeled for Pepsi, Bone Jewellery, Cezarina Boghinciuc Jewelry, India Bijoux, Fashion Days, Tex Romania Fall 2014, Lee Cooper S/S 2016, Modagram Turkey, Ciuc Radler, Honda Livo.
- Iulia Micloș signed with MRA Models. She took a number of test shots and featured in magazine editorials for CSID January 2012, Luxury January 2012. She has modeled for Tina R S/S 2012, Azzara Fashion House, Ma Dame Stil, and walked the runway of Mengotti, Dorin Negrau A/W 2012. Micloș retired from modeling in 2014.
- Diana Trofin signed with MRA Models. She has taken some test shots and done some modeling in Milan. She retired from modeling in 2014.
- Irina Batrac signed with MRA Models. She took a number of test shots and modeled for Carmen Emanuela Popa SS14, Meli Melo Paris PreSpring 2014, Corina Tudor Makeup, Karine Reptile Bracelet. She was featured in magazine editorials for British Vogue December 2013, Scorpio Jin US #9 January 2017, Estela US January 2017, Elléments US March 2017, Trend Privé US March 2017, Switch Italia April 2017, Stell Australia May 2017, One Coast Thailand May–June 2017. Batrac retired from modeling in 2020.
- Karin Arz signed with MRA Models. She took a number of test shots and modeled for L'Oreal, Atelier Eugenia Enciu, Raluca Mihalceanu, Elena Perseil, Ersa Atelier, Meli Melo Paris, Avon, Maritimo Shopping Center, Beauty District Salon, Fashion Days, Matrix Essentials, Simona Semen. She has appeared on magazine cover and editorials for Cosmopolitan, Glamour, Cockaigne, Beau Monde Mirese, Hair Style, Sun Time #4 Winter 2011, Tabu February 2012, Look! March 2012, The One March 2012, Harper's Bazaar December 2012, Unica Beauty March 2013, Joy September 2013, Make-Up #4 June 2013, Marie Claire November 2013, Unica December 2014, Jute #21 May 2015. She retired from modeling in 2016.
- Sandra Ciubotariu signed with MRA Models. She took a number of test shots and appeared on magazine editorials for Tabu, CSID. She has modeled and shooting campaigns for Sun Plaza Mall, Lidl, Resident Evil: Revelations, Iiana, Manurí Store, BeAware Mask, and walked the runway of Cătălin Botezatu Fall 2012, Sushma Patel, Elie Esper.
- Iuliana Mînza signed with MRA Models. She took a number of test shots and walked the runway of Escada, Mihai Albu, Kinga Varga. She retired from modeling in 2014.
- Laura Giurcanu collected her prizes and signed with MRA Models. She is also signed with Awesome Models in Shenzhen, MP Management in Paris and Major Model Management in New York City, Milan & Paris. She has walked the runway of Mirela Diaconu, Lashez, Daniela Gregis FW12, and modeled for About You, Coca-Cola, Silvia Serban, Rhea Costa, Sincolors by Andreea, PNK Casual, Diva Charms, Carmen Emanuela Popa SS13, Mirela Stelea SS13, Venera Arapu FW 14/15, Cristallini, Ümit Ünal Design, Malvensky Paris, Ena Stan Fashion, Lana Dumitru, Retro Future Babe, Penti Turkey. Giurcanu has appeared on magazine cover and editorials for Elle, Unica, Bravo Girl! #26 December 2011, Marie Claire April 2012, Noblesse Korea May 2012, Glamour June 2012, 1V1Y Turkey July 2012, Vogue Türkiye September 2012, Grazia Italia October 2012, Beau Monde November 2012, iMute #2 2013, Cosmopolitan April 2013, British Vogue April 2013, Tatler UK May 2013, Joy June 2013, The One August 2013, Miasto Kobiet Poland #1 2014, Șapte Seri February 2018, Șapte Seri Trends Summer 2019. Beside modeling, she appeared in the music video for Twenty Eight by The Weeknd and featuring on "Fanele" by Liviu Teodorescu & Dorian Popa, and as a contestant on Survivor România 2022.

== Controversy ==
Controversy arose surrounding 17-year-old contestant Irina Batrac early in the competition. The conflict began in the fourth episode when several contestants expressed concerns about Batrac’s perceived inconsiderate attitude. This led to a heated exchange involving 21-year-old Iuliana Mînza after a runway challenge, which required host Cătălin Botezatu to intervene. The situation escalated in episode 6 when Batrac became visibly distressed after Mînza and fellow contestant Flori Ciupu played pranks on her, including pouring chocolate sauce into her hair while she was asleep, tampering with her toothbrush by covering it in superglue, and replacing her makeup remover with shampoo. When Botezatu addressed the contestants regarding the incident, Mînza and Ciupu were seen suppressing laughter. Despite this, neither Botezatu nor the production staff took further action to assist Batrac. Tensions eventually subsided, but Batrac was eliminated several weeks later after landing in the bottom two alongside Mînza, who had at that point been in the bottom two for three consecutive weeks. Mînza ultimately advanced to the finale, finishing as the runner-up.
