= GayOne =

Romanian LGBTQ news service

- Website type: LGBT portal and news
- Owner: 2G Online SRL
- Website: http://www.gayone.ro
- Commercial: Yes
- Registration: Optional
- Launched: 2000
- Current status: Non-Active

GayOne is an online LGBT portal and news service in the Romanian language. The current website was founded in 2005, as the successor to the 2G.ro portal, the first of its kind in Romania. GayOne.ro provides frequently-updated LGBT news in Romanian, with a focus both on Romanian and worldwide gay issues. Although the publication does not have a printed form, it is one of the most utilised sources of news for Romania's LGBT community, and in 2006 was awarded the prize for "Best medium of information for the LGBT community" at Be An Angel's Gay Prize Gala, which took place during the Gay Film Nights Festival and is intended to recognise those who have contributed to LGBT culture and rights throughout the year.

== See also ==
- Inklusiv, a printed Romanian LGBT magazine published by Accept
- Switch, a printed Romanian LGBT magazine published by Be An Angel
- Gay rights in Romania
