= Lucian Dunăreanu =

Romanian activist (born 1977)

Lucian Dunăreanu, the executive director of Be An Angel Romania

Lucian Dunăreanu (born 22 November 1977) is a Romanian gay rights activist and the executive director of Be An Angel Romania, an LGBT rights organisation based in Cluj-Napoca, now PRIDE ROMÂNIA.

== LGBT activities ==
Since 2004 he has organized the Gay Film Nights Festival, which includes, alongside a film festival, the Miss Travesty contest and the Gay Prize Gala for contributions to Romania's LGBT community. Dunăreanu is the editor of Romania's first LGBT magazine, Angelicuss; he was also editor of the short-lived Switch magazine.

Dunareanu is the owner of the Veverițele Vesele - ex-Toxice musical group, which is the first professional drag queen band in Romania, and was the first Romanian group of its kind to enter the Eurovision national preselection and Romanian TV shows Mondenii and Românii au talent. The slogan of Veverițele Vesele is that "Drag queen is an art and has nothing to do with sexual orientation".

Alongside these activities, Dunăreanu also participates in AIDS awareness and prevention campaigns and is the owner of Delirio clubs (LGBT clubs).

On 6 November 2024, Dunareanu was charged with drug trafficking and child exploitation. According to authorities, he is one of four individuals involved in a network that allegedly recruited and exploited minors, ages 15 to 17, over several years. The minors were reportedly supplied with high-risk drugs to deepen their dependency. The Cluj Tribunal has ordered a 90-day preventive detention for all four suspects as investigations continue.

== See also ==
- Gay rights in Romania
- Gay Film Nights
