= The Woman Worker (disambiguation) =

The Woman Worker (1907–1910) was a newspaper published in the United Kingdom by the National Federation of Women Workers.

The title may also refer to:

- The Woman Worker (1926–1929), a Canadian newspaper edited by Florence Custance
- Rabotnitsa (founded 1914), a Russian journal
- Die Arbeiterin (1890–1891), a German newspaper which became Die Gleichheit
- Dolgozó nő (1945–1989), a Hungarian-language Romanian magazine

== See also ==
- Working Woman (disambiguation)
