= Next Top Model (Romanian TV series) season 3 =

Next Top Model
- Season 3
- Season 3 cast
- Presented by: Cătălin Botezatu
- Judges: Cătălin Botezatu; Laurent Tourett; Liviu Ionescu; Mirela Vescan
- No. of episodes: 14

Release
- Original network: Antena 1
- Original release: September 20 – December 27, 2012

Season chronology
- ← Previous; Season 2

The third season of Next Top Model by Cătălin Botezatu premiered on September 20, 2012, at 20:20 on Antena 1. All judges from the previous season returned, and the prize package remained the same, with contestants competing for a modeling contract with MRA Models valued at €70,000. The participation requirements, which included being between the ages of 14 to 25, over 170 cm tall, and holding a valid Romanian or Moldovan passport, also remained unchanged.

This season saw a record number of applicants, with over 20,000 women applying and attending castings from April to June 2012. Filming took place in Romania and later moved to locations in Greece, Cyprus, and Turkey. Contestants unable to attend the castings were invited to participate in a four-week online photo contest to connect with potential clients and be considered for future projects.

Sixteen finalists were selected from a pool of 100 semifinalists, including a replacement for a dropout. The winner of the season was 22-year-old Ramona Popescu from Bucharest.

Season three marked the final installment of the series, as host Cătălin Botezatu stepped away from the project due to personal matters. In 2015, Botezatu launched Supermodels by Cătălin Botezatu on Kanal D, a similar competition featuring both male and female contestants, inspired by Naomi Campbell's The Face. It starred much of the same cast, crew, and guests that had been featured on Next Top Model.

== Cast ==
=== Contestants ===
(Ages stated are at start of contest)

Contestant	Age	Height	Hometown	Finish	Place
Veronica Cazac	18	1.80 m (5 ft 11 in)	Chișinău, Moldova	Episode 1	17 (quit)
Silvana Anghel	15	1.80 m (5 ft 11 in)	Onești	Episode 2	16
Diana Luca	15	1.78 m (5 ft 10 in)	Piatra Neamț	Episode 3	15–14
Bianca Taban	20	1.73 m (5 ft 8 in)	Bucharest	Episode 3	15–14
Andreea Grecu	19	1.79 m (5 ft 10 1/2 in)	Chișinău, Moldova	Episode 4	13
Ruxandra Postatny	18	1.77 m (5 ft 9 1/2 in)	Teiuș	Episode 5	12
Victoria Cartiră	14	1.78 m (5 ft 10 in)	Chișinău, Moldova	Episode 7	11
Diana Zamfir	17	1.77 m (5 ft 9 1/2 in)	Pitești	Episode 8	10–9
Alexandra Urs	21	1.76 m (5 ft 9 1/2 in)	Alesd	Episode 8	10–9
Sânziana Cozorici	16	1.75 m (5 ft 9 in)	Suceava	Episode 9	8
Otilia Cioșă	20	1.80 m (5 ft 11 in)	Timișoara	Episode 11	7
Lavinia Furtună	17	1.75 m (5 ft 9 in)	Botoșani	Episode 12	6
Laura Iordache	23	1.82 m (5 ft 11 1/2 in)	Buzău	Episode 13	5–4
Cristina Iordache	23	1.80 m (5 ft 11 in)	Buzău	Episode 13	5–4
Denisa Ciocoiu	19	1.82 m (5 ft 11 1/2 in)	Turnu Măgurele	Episode 14	3–2
Barbara Langellotti	20	1.75 m (5 ft 9 in)	Piatra Neamț	Episode 14	3–2
Ramona Popescu	22	1.76 m (5 ft 9 1/2 in)	Bucharest	Episode 14	1

=== Judges ===
- Cătălin Botezatu - Host
- Laurent Tourette - Hair stylist
- Liviu Ionescu - MRA Models
- Mirela Vescan - Makeup artist

== Episodes ==
No. overall	No. in season	Title	Original release date
28	1	"Episode 1"	20 September 2012
The Next Top Model caravan began its journey across Romania in search of the next batch of model hopefuls. Over 20,000 women showed up in an attempt to impress the judges and be chosen as one of the top 100 semifinalists. The top 100 were invited back to Bucharest for a final round of interviews, after which the top 16 finalists were chosen. At the end of the week, the models moved into their new home at Hotel Caro to get to know one another and prepare for the upcoming challenges. Veronica Cazac from Moldova decided to drop out at the last minute, opening up a spot for her replacement, Bianca Taban.: Special guest: Alina Pușcaș, Guido Dolci (Major Model Management)
29	2	"Episode 2"	27 September 2012
The finalists headed to the salon for a round of makeovers, which included new hairstyles and makeup updates designed to enhance their new looks. They later took part in their first challenge, which was won by Andreea, in which they put their posing skills to the test as they attempted to cross a maze full of laser beams. The models ended their week with a photo shoot session on the riverbank of the Neajlov with a male model, where they had to portray Adam and Eve in the Garden of Eden while posing with a Burmese Python. At judging, Denisa received best picture. Sânziana and Silvana landed in the bottom two, and Silvana was eliminated from the competition.: Featured photographer: Mihai Ștețcu
30	3	"Episode 3"	4 October 2012
The contestants were put through their paces with a slippery runway teach at the edge of a pool, before participating in a dominatrix-themed runway show at the FashionTV Summer Festival in Mamaia, showcasing designs by Mihai Albu and Cătălin Botezatu. After Sânziana was left feeling dejected from the events of the week prior, and having opened up about her story of growing up in an orphanage, the other models pooled together their money to make a heartfelt gesture. For their weekly photo shoot, the contestants posed nude behind a wall of ice. However, Laura was unable to take part due to feeling unwell, and her twin sister, Cristina, revealed that Laura was experiencing bouts of lightheadedness from crash dieting to fit the show's requirements. At the judging, Otilia was awarded best picture, while Bianca and Diana Luca found themselves in the bottom two; in an unexpected twist, both were eliminated from the competition.: Featured photographer: Andreea Retinschi
31	4	"Episode 4"	11 October 2012
The remaining thirteen models faced the challenge of a runway teach, where they had to balance various objects in their hands without dropping any. Later, they participated in a chilly underground runway show at the Salina Turda salt mine, styled in extraterrestrial metallic makeup and designs as they braved the frigid temperatures. To wrap up their week, the contestants visited a construction site for a risqué photo shoot, posing with male models among the machinery while showcasing their sex appeal. At judging, Victoria received best picture. Andreea and Lavinina landed in the bottom two, and Andreea was eliminated from the competition.: Featured photographer: Marta Popescu; Special guest: Mircea Bărbulescu
32	5	"Episode 5"	18 October 2012
The remaining twelve models kicked off their week with an undercover visit from actor Gabriel Dutu for a stunt acting class, before being split into groups of angels and demons for a photo shoot with a motorcycle gang of fire-breathing performers. Later, the models had a gymnastics lesson, after which they had to showcase their newfound skills in a challenge posing as living accessories. The challenge was conducted in teams, and the winning team — composed of Barbara, Cristina, Diana Zamfir, Lavinia, Sânziana, and Victoria — was granted immunity from the upcoming elimination. At judging, Barbara received best picture. Alexandra and Ruxandra found themselves in the bottom two, and Ruxandra was eliminated from the competition.: Featured photographer: Zoltan Lorencz; Special guests: Gabriel Dutu
33	6	"Episode 6"	25 October 2012
The contestants were flown to the island of Mykonos for the next leg of the competition, where they settled into their new hotel before participating in a photo challenge on the beach, requiring them to maintain composure while being tossed in the air. Later that evening, they enjoyed a party featuring traditional island delicacies. Tensions arose over cell phone usage, which was restricted to specific times, and intensified when Ramona's phone went missing, making Lavinia the prime suspect. The week concluded with the models being fitted in black gowns for a photo shoot in picturesque locations around the island. At judging, Christina received best picture, while Alexandra, Lavinia, Sânziana, and Victoria found themselves in the bottom four. In an unexpected twist, all four of them were allowed to remain in the competition.: Featured photographer: Mihai Ștețcu
34	7	"Episode 7"	1 November 2012
The remaining eleven contestants were in introduced to prominent entrepreneur and hospitality executive Giannis Galatis for a brief history about tourism on the island. They were then challenged to star in a Greek-scripted mock advertisement for a new brand of olive oil, which proved difficult for many, as most struggled to deliver their lines effectively. Following this, they were interviewed by the press to promote the allure of tourism in Mykonos. Later that night, the models participated in a colorful swimsuit runway presentation in the streets of the island, showcasing their looks in front of the public. For their photo shoot, the models posed as mermaids entangled by fishermen. At judging, Otilia received best picture. Laura and Victoria landed in the bottom two, and Victoria was eliminated from the competition.: Featured photographer: Mihai Ștețcu; Specia guest: Giannis Galatis
35	8	"Episode 8"	8 November 2012
The remaining ten contestants gathered for a makeup lesson with judge Mirela Vescan, where they opened up about some of the more intimate dynamics within the group. This was followed by a runway presentation and accompanying shoot inspired by the legend of the love story between the fisherman Glaucus and the sea nymph Scylla, which took a dramatic turn when one of the props became loose and tumbled down the cliff, giving everyone on set a scare. Later that week, the models came together to celebrate Alexandra's 21st birthday. For their final challenge, the contestants were painted white and stripped bare for a photo shoot where they had to portray marble statues come to life, relying solely on their silhouettes. At judging, Barbara received best picture. Alexandra, Diana Zamfir, and Ramona landed in the bottom three. Ramona was given a second chance, while Alexandra and Diana were eliminated from the competition.: Featured photographer: Mihai Ștețcu
36	9	"Episode 9"	15 November 2012
The models returned to Romania for their next set of challenges. They began their week by being sat down for a conversation with actor Andrei Aradits, who discussed their experiences before they participated in an acting lesson that involved portraying exaggerated scenarios. Subsequently, they were styled for a runway show at the Sibiu Student Fashion Festival, highlighting the creations of emerging designers, and culminating in an autograph signing for the show’s fans. For their weekly photo shoot, they were taken to the Sinaia Casino and styled after the infamous Disney antagonist Cruella de Vil, posing with a variety of animals that were brought on set. At judging, Otilia received best picture. Denisa and Sânziana landed in the bottom two, and Sânziana was eliminated from the competition. Having been moved by her personal story and resilience, she was offered a makeup course from Intact Media Academy and the Mereu Aproape Foundation under the guidance of judge Mirela Vescan.: Featured photographer: Oana Mihoc; Special guest: Andrei Aradits
37	10	"Episode 10"	22 November 2012
In this episode, the remaining seven contestants traveled to Paphos, where they settled in for the week's challenges. Host Cătălin Botezatu took some contestants aside to discuss their performances in the competition, raising concerns about Lavinia's adherence to the show's requirements due to her noticeable weight gain. The models were fitted into sheer black gowns for a runway presentation at Paphos Harbour, where several contestants encountered difficulties on the rocky terrain. For the weekly photo shoot, the contestants visited the Adonis Baths waterfall, posing with a male model to depict the love story of Adonis and Aphrodite. At judging, Barbara received best picture. Cristina and Otilia landed in the bottom two, but were given a reprieve, as both of them were allowed to stay for one more week.: Featured photographer: Ciprian Strugariu
38	11	"Episode 11"	6 December 2012
The contestants faced the challenge of making their best impression during a mock interview casting challenge conducted in English, where their goal was to sell themselves using only their wit and creativity, all while wearing the same unflattering potato sack. They also swapped genders for a runway presentation at the port, styled as men, and later embraced their feminine side during a colorful candy pinup swimwear-themed photo shoot on the beach. At judging, Ramona received best picture, while Denisa and Otilia found themselves in the bottom two. Denisa was given another chance, while Otilia's inconsistency cost her a place in the competition.: Featured photographer: Ciprian Strugariu
39	12	"Episode 12"	13 December 2012
The remaining six contestants were quizzed on their fashion knowledge, or lack thereof, before facing the results of the exam. They were then coached for a choreographed cabaret dance number and fashion presentation inspired by the 2002 musical film Chicago, after which the other contestants celebrated Barbara's birthday. At the end of the week, the models were taken to the Eléa Golf Club for an elegant photo shoot inspired by the sport. On set, Lavinia was critiqued once again for being unable to fit into the wardrobe, raising concerns about her longevity in the competition. At judging, Denisa received best picture, while Laura and Lavinia landed in the bottom two, resulting in Lavinia's elimination.: Featured photographer: Ciprian Strugariu
40	13	"Episode 13"	20 December 2012
The models returned to Romania for the semi-final round of the competition. With the holidays fast approaching, they were visited by Botezatu, who arrived with Christmas gifts and decorations to create a festive atmosphere. They met with nutritionist Gianluca Ech for guidance on improving their diets, and later sat down for dinner to reminisce about some of the competition’s most memorable moments. They also took part in a winter-themed runway presentation before heading to their photo shoot, inspired by the German fairy tale Snow White. At judging, Ramona received best picture, while Barbara, Cristina, and Laura landed in the bottom three. Barbara secured a spot in the finale alongside Denisa and Ramona, while twin sisters Cristina and Laura were eliminated.: Featured photographer: Marta Popescu; Special guest: Gianluca Ech
41	14	"Episode 14"	27 December 2012
The final three were flown to Cappadocia for the final week of the competition. They participated in a whimsical runway presentation and completed two sets of photo shoots among the region's rock architecture and iconic fairy chimneys, drawing inspiration from J. R. R. Tolkien's epic fantasy novel The Lord of the Rings. During the final deliberation, the judges reviewed their overall body of work, but the final decision was put on hold as a special surprise was arranged for the finalists. At the end of the week, they were taken to the region’s hot air balloon fields, where host Cătălin Botezatu chose Ramona as the winner, and treated her to a birds eye view of the scenic rock formations.: Featured photographer: Gabriel Hennessey

== Results ==
Order	Episodes													
Order	1 (Note: In episode 1, Veronica withdrew from the competition. She was replaced by Bianca at the end of the episode.)	2	3 (Note: In episode 3, Laura did not participate in the photo-shoot. Bianca and Diana L, were both eliminated when they landed in the bottom two.)	4	5 (Note: In episode 5, Barbara, Cristina, Diana Z, Lavinia, Sânziana, and Victoria were immune from elimination after their team won the reward challenge.)	6 (Note: In episode 6, Alexandra, Lavinia, Sânziana, and Victoria landed in the bottom four. None of them were eliminated.)	7	8 (Note: In episode 8, Alexandra, Diana Z, and Ramona landed in the bottom three. Cătălin handed the last photograph to Ramona, eliminating Alexandra and Diana.)	9	10 (Note: In episode 10, Cristina and Otilia landed in the bottom two. Cătălin revealed that neither of them was eliminated.)	11	12	13 (Note: In episode 13, Barbara, Cristina, and Laura landed in the bottom three. Cătălin handed the last photograph to Barbara, eliminating Cristina and Laura.)	14
1	Victoria	Denisa	Otilia	Victoria	Barbara	Cristina	Otilia	Barbara	Otilia	Barbara	Ramona	Denisa	Ramona	Ramona
2	Silvana	Ramona	Lavinia	Laura	Sânziana	Ramona	Denisa	Sânziana	Barbara	Laura	Barbara	Ramona	Denisa	Barbara; Denisa
3	Ruxandra	Alexandra	Cristina	Ruxandra	Victoria	Laura	Ramona	Laura	Ramona	Ramona	Laura	Barbara	Barbara	Barbara; Denisa
4	Ramona	Lavinia	Ramona	Ramona	Diana Z.	Otilia	Diana Z.	Denisa	Laura	Lavinia	Cristina	Cristina	Cristina; Laura	
5	Lavinia	Diana Z.	Andreea	Alexandra	Lavinia	Diana Z.	Lavinia	Cristina	Lavinia	Denisa	Lavinia	Laura	Cristina; Laura	
6	Diana L.	Otilia	Diana Z.	Denisa	Cristina	Denisa	Cristina	Otilia	Cristina	Cristina; Otilia	Denisa	Lavinia		
7	Cristina	Diana L.	Barbara	Otilia	Laura	Barbara	Barbara	Lavinia	Denisa	Cristina; Otilia	Otilia			
8	Laura	Cristina	Denisa	Diana Z.	Ramona	Alexandra; Lavinia; Sânziana; Victoria	Sânziana	Ramona	Sânziana					
9	Diana Z.	Bianca	Sânziana	Sânziana	Denisa	Alexandra; Lavinia; Sânziana; Victoria	Alexandra	Alexandra; Diana Z.						
10	Alexandra	Victoria	Alexandra	Barbara	Otilia	Alexandra; Lavinia; Sânziana; Victoria	Laura	Alexandra; Diana Z.						
11	Sânziana	Ruxandra	Ruxandra	Cristina	Alexandra	Alexandra; Lavinia; Sânziana; Victoria	Victoria							
12	Denisa	Andreea	Laura	Lavinia	Ruxandra									
13	Barbara	Barbara	Victoria	Andreea										
14	Veronica	Laura	Bianca; Diana L.											
15	Otilia	Sânziana	Bianca; Diana L.											
16	Andreea	Silvana												
17	Bianca													

The contestant was a separate addition later added to the cast.
The contestant quit the competition.
The contestant was eliminated.
The contestant was immune from elimination.
The contestant was part of a non-elimination.
The contestant won the competition.
