= Next Top Model (Romanian TV series) season 1 =

Next Top Model
- Season 1
- Season 1 cast
- Presented by: Cătălin Botezatu
- Judges: Cătălin Botezatu; Gabriel Hennessey; Laurent Tourette; Liviu Ionescu; Mirela Vescan
- No. of episodes: 12

Release
- Original network: Antena 1
- Original release: February 3 – April 21, 2011

Season chronology
- Next → Season 2

The first season of Next Top Model by Cătălin Botezatu premiered on Thursday February 3, 2011 at 20:20 on Antena 1. The competition was hosted by Romanian fashion designer Cătălin Botezatu, with a judging panel that included photographer Gabriel Hennessey, makeup artist Mirela Vescan, hairstylist Laurent Tourette, and model agent Liviu Ionescu.

To qualify, contestants had to be between 16 and 25 years old at the time of applying, stand at least 170 cm tall, and hold a valid Romanian or Moldovan passport. Filming for the season began in late 2010.

Twelve contestants were selected by the judges from a shortlist of 50 semifinalists, narrowed down from a pool of approximately 5,000 applicants. They lived together at the Monte Carlo Palace in Bucharest before traveling to various locations, including Egypt, Finland, the United Arab Emirates, and France, in the latter half of the competition.

The season crowned 16-year-old Emma Dumitrescu from Bucharest as the winner. Among her prizes was a modeling contract with MRA Models valued at €50,000. The series was renewed for a second season, which began airing in September 2011.

== Cast ==
=== Contestants ===
(Ages stated are at start of contest)

Contestant	Age	Height	Hometown	Finish	Place
Anca Vasile	18	1.76 m (5 ft 9 1/2 in)	Ploiești	Episode 2	12
Diana Donoiu	18	1.82 m (5 ft 11 1/2 in)	Craiova	Episode 3	11
Sara Măgurean	16	1.73 m (5 ft 8 in)	Reșița	Episode 4	10
Adela Neagu	21	1.78 m (5 ft 10 in)	Bucharest	Episode 5	9
Lucia Popa	23	1.75 m (5 ft 9 in)	Giurgiu	Episode 6	8 (DQ)
Inga Ojog	19	1.78 m (5 ft 10 in)	Chișinău, Moldova	Episode 6	7
Otilia Pană	21	1.71 m (5 ft 7 1/2 in)	Timișoara	Episode 7	6
Alexandra Băbăscu	18	1.76 m (5 ft 9 1/2 in)	Bucharest	Episode 9	5
Laura Dumitru	19	1.78 m (5 ft 10 in)	Vălenii de Munte	Episode 10	4
Roxana Cristian	25	1.80 m (5 ft 11 in)	Bacău	Episode 11	3
Mădălina Barbu	25	1.77 m (5 ft 9 1/2 in)	Bucharest	Episode 12	2
Emma Dumitrescu	16	1.74 m (5 ft 8 1/2 in)	Bucharest	Episode 12	1

=== Judges ===
- Cătălin Botezatu - Host
- Gabriel Hennessey - Photographer
- Laurent Tourette - Hair stylist
- Liviu Ionescu - MRA Models
- Mirela Vescan - Makeup artist

== Episodes ==
No. overall	No. in season	Title	Original release date
1	1	"Episode 1"	3 February 2011
The judges visited several cities in Romania, for a round of auditions where they chose a shortlist of 50 semifinalists to possibly compete in the show. The chosen semifinalists later arrived in Bucharest for a final round of interviews with the judges. At the end of the week, they chose 10 finalists (Roxana, Otilia, Inga, Mădălina, Lucia, Laura, Emma, Alexandra, Anca, Sara), and later added an additional two contestants (Adela and Diana) once the models had moved into their new apartment at the Monte Carlo Palace.: Special guests: Olga Calpajiu, Guido Dolci (Major Model Management)
2	2	"Episode 2"	10 February 2011
The contestants began the week by receiving their highly anticipated makeovers, and later received a runway lesson from model Bianca Drăgușanu in order to prepare for a runway show challenge, where they showcased designs by host Cătălin Botezatu. Later, they participated in a wildlife-themed photo shoot set in a botanical garden. At judging, Roxana received best picture. Anca and Otilia landed in the bottom two, and Anca was eliminated from the competition.: Featured photographer: Gabriel Henessey; Special guests: Bianca Drăgușanu, Busta Rhymes, Ana Catharina (guest judge)
3	3	"Episode 3"	17 February 2011
The models had a workout and aerobic session at the gym followed by a runway lesson with Brazilian model Ana Catharina at a ballet studio. Later in the week they had a makeup lesson with judge Mirela Vescan, followed by a Maybelline commercial challenge with makeup artist Nick Barna, which was won by Inga and Mădălina. For the photo shoot, the contestants had to pose in a meat storage facility. At elimination, the editor of Romanian Cosmopolitan was guest judge. Otilia received best picture. Diana and Lucia landed in the bottom two, and Diana was eliminated from the competition.: Featured photographer: Gabriel Henessey; Special guests: Ana Catharina, Nick Barna
4	4	"Episode 4"	24 February 2011
The remaining ten models sat down for a lesson with actress Alina Pușcaș, from the TV series Narcisa Salbatica, and were later flown abroad to Egypt. Upon arrival they were taken to the city of Giza, and had a runway presentation and photo shoot challenge at Karnak wearing colorful designs by Cătălin Botezatu, where Roxana was chosen as the winner. Later in the week the contestants had a fragrance photo shoot on the beach. At judging, Luxury magazine editor Leon Arhire was guest judge. Alexandra received best photo, while Roxana was awarded the opportunity to appear in a pictorial for Luxury. Inga and Sara landed in the bottom two, and Sara was eliminated from the competition.: Featured photographer: Gabriel Henessey; Special guests: Alina Pușcaș, Leon Arhire (guest judge)
5	5	"Episode 5"	3 March 2011
The remaining nine contestants participated in a runway challenge presentation on the beach, which was won by Alexandra. Later in the week, they traveled to the Giza Plateau for a photo shoot wearing gowns, with the Sphinx and the pyramids of Giza, Khafre, and Menkaure as the backdrop. The contestants had to adapt to challenging conditions, including the heat and strong winds, to deliver their best shots. At judging, Laura received best photo. Adela and Emma landed in the bottom two, and Adela was eliminated from the competition.: Featured photographer: Gabriel Henessey
6	6	"Episode 6"	10 March 2011
The remaining eight models returned to Romania. Back at the hotel they received a visit from judge Liviu Ionescu and one of the models from his agency, Silvia Giurca. They had to participate in a mock casting modeling a pair of glasses. Later that week the contestants were taken to a casino for a runway presentation challenge wearing black couture gowns, which was won by Emma. Lucia and Emma got into an argument, which ended in a physical altercation back at the house. On set, the models had a nude photo shoot wearing a single article of clothing from a mannequin. At judging, Lucia was disqualified for having instigated the fight that had taken place earlier that week. After deliberation, Alexandra received best photo. Emma and Inga landed in the bottom two, and Inga was eliminated from the competition.: Featured photographer: Gabriel Henessey; Special guest: Silvia Giurca
7	7	"Episode 7"	17 March 2011
The models were flown to Rovaniemi, Lapland in time for the holiday season, and had a guided tour of Santa Claus Village with host Cătălin Botezatu. Later in the week they had an outdoor runway presentation in the snow, after which Mădălina began to feel ill from the cold, and had to be evacuated. The remaining five contestants took part in a winter themed photo shoot wearing fur pelts and bikinis, with Mădălina returning shortly after. Later that night, the models made a visit to the Arctic Snowhotel. At judging, Roxana received best photo. Emma and Otilia landed in the bottom two, and Otilia was eliminated from the competition.: Featured photographer: Gabriel Henessey
8	8	"Episode 8"	24 March 2011
The contestants checked in at the airport as the competition moved to Dubai. Upon arriving at their penthouse suite in the luxurious Fairmont Hotel, the models participated in a rooftop runway challenge over a pool, during which Laura took an unexpected dive. Mădălina was declared the winner of the challenge. Later, the models were driven to the desert for a sleek off-roading photo shoot, where they had to pose with falcons. At judging, Mădălina received best photo. Alexandra and Laura landed in the bottom two, and in a shocking turn of events, both were allowed to remain in the competition.: Featured photographer: Gabriel Henessey
9	9	"Episode 9"	31 March 2011
The contestants were introduced to model Dana Dorobantu for a brief chat before being challenged to perform in a scripted perfume commercial in Arabic at their penthouse pool. Mădălina was chosen as the winner of this challenge. Later, the models wore designs by Cătălin Botezatu while posing inside the hotel's panoramic elevators as they moved between floors. Their week continued at the Al Habtoor Polo Resort & Club, where they viewed a polo match and participated in a photo shoot. That evening, they were treated to an outing to watch the Burj Khalifa fountain show, and took part in their final challenge the following morning —a swimwear runway presentation that concluded with a photo shoot on the beach overlooking the Burj Al Arab. At judging, Mădălina received best photo. Alexandra and Roxana landed in the bottom two, and Alexandra was eliminated from the competition.: Featured photographer: Gabriel Henessey; Special guest: Dana Dorobantu, Mohammed Al Habtoor
10	10	"Episode 10"	7 April 2011
The remaining four contestants returned to Romania, arriving in Transylvania for a week of challenges inspired by the region's legends and mysticism. They participated in a series of vampire and goth inspired runway presentations accompanied by themed photo sessions. After being treated to a horseback riding lesson, they faced their final photo shoot challenge on the grounds of the historic Corvin Castle by modeling ecclesiastical-inspired robes. However, the results of the shoot left much to be desired. At judging, Emma received best photo. Laura and Roxana wound up in the bottom two, and Laura was eliminated from the competition.: Featured photographer: Gabriel Henessey; Special guest: Alin Galatescu
11	11	"Episode 11"	14 April 2011
The final three arrived at the Ramada hotel in Brașov for the penultimate week of the competition. They were taken to the Brașov Opera House for a ballet lesson with instructor and choreographer Genoveva Breaz before participating in a dramatic runway show. Later, they traveled to the historic town of Sighișoara, where they enjoyed a private luncheon with host Cătălin Botezatu. They then took part in a semi-nude conceptual photo shoot in a salt mine and were treated to a nighttime tour of the city, ending the evening by bonding over dinner. Their final challenge of the week was a baroque-inspired runway presentation. At judging, Mădălina and Emma were selected as the finalists, while Roxana bid farewell to the competition.: Featured photographer: Mihai Sfetcu; Special guest: Genoveva Breaz
12	12	"Episode 12"	21 April 2011
The finalists were taken to the offices of judge Liviu Iunescu's MRA Models, where they participated in a series of photo shoots to build their professional portfolios. They later reunited with the previously eliminated contestants at the Pensiunea Mai in Rășinari before walking in a runway show at the Promenada. They then traveled to Paris, where they met with an agent from Major Model Management and received their comp cards and photo books from the shoots they had completed earlier that week. They attended a casting for French designer Christophe Guillarmé and enjoyed an outing at the Galerie des Champs-Elysées. To conclude their journey, they participated in a Black Swan inspired photo shoot on the streets of Paris before facing the judges one last time for the final deliberation, where Emma was crowned the winner.: Featured photographer: Oltin Dogaru, Radu Chindris, Gabriel Henessey; Special guest: Mateo Aubrun, Christophe Guillarmé

== Results ==
Order	Episode											
Order	1 (Note: At the end of episode 1, Adela and Diana were introduced to the competition after the finalists had been selected.)	2	3	4	5	6 (Note: In episode 6, Lucia was disqualified for her violent behavior towards Emma before the actual elimination began.)	7 (Note: In episode 7, Mădălina did not participate in the photo shoot.)	8 (Note: In episode 8, Alexandra and Laura Landed in the bottom two, but neither of them was eliminated.)	9	10	11	12
1	Roxana	Roxana	Otilia	Alexandra	Laura	Alexandra	Roxana	Mădălina	Mădălina	Emma	Mădălina	Emma
2	Otilia	Mădălina	Laura	Laura	Alexandra	Mădălina	Laura	Emma	Laura	Mădălina	Emma	Mădălina
3	Inga	Laura	Alexandra	Roxana	Mădălina	Roxana	Alexandra	Roxana	Emma	Roxana	Roxana	
4	Mădălina	Alexandra	Mădălina	Emma	Otilia	Otilia	Mădălina	Alexandra; Laura	Roxana	Laura		
5	Lucia	Sara	Inga	Otilia	Inga	Laura	Emma	Alexandra; Laura	Alexandra			
6	Laura	Emma	Adela	Mădălina	Roxana	Emma	Otilia					
7	Emma	Inga	Sara	Lucia	Lucia	Inga						
8	Alexandra	Adela	Emma	Adela	Emma	Lucia						
9	Anca	Lucia	Roxana	Inga	Adela							
10	Sara	Diana	Lucia	Sara								
11	Adela; Diana	Otilia	Diana									
12	Adela; Diana	Anca										

The contestant were scouted at a separate audition and later added to the cast.
The contestant was eliminated.
The contestant was disqualified from the competition.
The contestant was part of a non-elimination bottom two.
The contestant won the competition.

== Controversy ==
There was controversy surrounding the season's sixth episode due to a physical altercation between 23-year-old Lucia Popa and the show's eventual winner, 16-year-old Emma Dumitrescu. Dumitrescu, one of the season's two youngest contestants along with Sara Măgurean, often drew Popa’s ire over their perceived immaturity. Tensions escalated following that week's photo shoot and runway challenge, which Dumitrescu won. Back at the apartment, the two got into an argument that culminated in Popa throwing water in Dumitrescu’s face. The confrontation escalated into a physical struggle, with both contestants grappling and pulling each other's hair until the other contestants intervened to separate them. At the start of that week's judging, host Cătălin Botezatu reprimanded them for their behavior and disqualified Popa from the competition. Dumitrescu landed in the bottom two alongside fellow contestant Inga Ojog but was allowed to remain in the competition on the strength of her photos and potential.
