= Ioan T. Morar =

Romanian writer (born 1956)

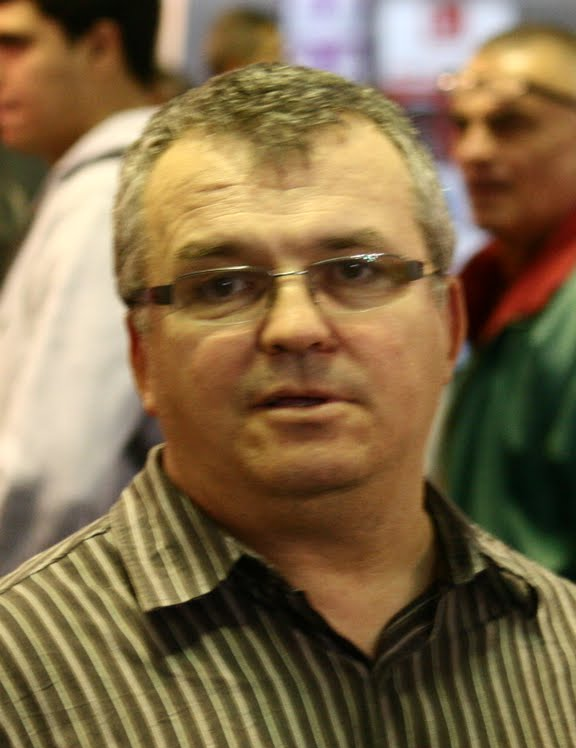
Ioan T. Morar (November 2009)

Ioan T. Morar (Romanian pronunciation: [iˈo̯an ˈte moˈrar]; born April 13, 1956) is a Romanian journalist, poet, dramatist, novelist, literary and art critic, diplomat and civil society activist. He is a founding member of the satirical magazine Academia Cațavencu (to which he notably contributes art and culture reviews) and, since 2004, a senior editor for Cotidianul. An amateur actor in his youth, he was also a member of the comedy troupe Divertis from the mid-1980s to 1996.

== Biography ==
Born in Șeitin, Arad County, Morar graduated as a valedictorian from the University of Timișoara's Faculty of Philology (Romanian-French section) in 1981. During the period, he became active in student theater groups — his troupe's performance in the 1981 adaptation of Vasile Alecsandri's comedy Sânziana și Pepelea won it first prize during a festival in Iași (the city where he also met with and joined Divertis).

Assigned to a teaching position in Lugoj, he sat on the editorial staff for the magazines Viața Studențească and Amfiteatru after 1987. He also began writing his first works of drama and poetry, and joined the Writers' Union. Morar's works, translated into several languages, won him the Writers' Union debut prize (1984, for Vara indiană) and its poetry prize (2000, for Șovăiala).

Following the 1989 Revolution, he became a member of the Civic Alliance, while contributing to the newspaper Cuvântul. In 1990, Morar was employed by the national television station's Entertainment section and created several shows, but resigned the following year.

He authored his debut novel Lindenfeld in 2006, to critical acclaim. A fresco of a Swabian locality in the Banat (see Lindenfeld, Caraș-Severin), it is considered a "Postmodern novel". Lindenfeld was awarded the prize for prose works by the newspaper Ziarul de Iași.

Morar returned to work for national television in 2006, and began hosting his talk show Lumea citește! ("People Read!"), aired by TVR 1. During the same year, he was invited to take part in the final stage of TVR1's Mari Români campaign, a series which called on intellectuals to showcase the 10 greatest Romanians ever (who had been determined by a poll); Morar supported Domnitor Alexandru Ioan Cuza for the top position, and co-produced a short television film depicting the latter's merits. As part of a 2005-2006 television advertising campaign for Kandia chocolate bars, Morar impersonated the last ruler of Communist Romania, Nicolae Ceaușescu.

In early 2007, he left on an extended journey to New Caledonia, which he documented in a special blog for Academia Cațavencu, called Morar&More.

In 2010, he was named Romania's Consul General in Marseille, France. In 2013 he published his second work of prose, "Negru și Rosu", which was shortlisted for "Book of the Year" by "România literară".

His 2016 novel Sărbătoarea Corturilor won the Prose section of the Romanian Writers' Union Awards. His non-fiction travel journal/memoir Șapte Ani în Provence was awarded the Special Prize at the 2018 Romanian Writers' Union Awards. His 2020 book chronicling the use of false narratives by both government and citizens, under communist dictatorship, Fake News in Epoca de Aur won him the 2020 Romanian Writers' Union Award for Writer of the Month for July.

In 2017 he was inducted into the Châteauneuf-du-Pape cupbearer group.

Morar won his European Court of Human Rights case against the Romanian state, as he argued that his sentence in a criminal defamation trial conviction was made in the absence of evidence and violated his journalistic freedom of expression.

== Works ==
- Îmblânzitorul de metafore (1981)
- Vara indiană (1984)
- Fumul și spada (1989)
- Șovăiala (2000)
- Nerușinarea (2003)
- Lindenfeld (2005)
- Paloarea (2010)
- Negru și Roșu (2013). Translated into Spanish: Negro y rojo. Madrid, 2016. By Joaquin Garrigos.
- Sărbătoarea Corturilor (2016)
- Șapte Ani în Provence (2018)
- Fake News în Epoca de Aur (2020)
