= Working Girl (disambiguation) =

Working Girl is a 1988 American film.

Working Girl(s) or The Working Girl(s) may also refer to:

- Prostitute
- Women in the workforce

== Film and television ==
=== Films ===
- Working Girl (2015 film), or Casa Amor: Exclusive for Ladies, a South Korean film
- Working Girls (1931 film), an American film directed by Dorothy Arzner
- Working Girls, a 1984 Filipino film directed by Ishmael Bernal
- Working Girls (1986 film), an American film by Lizzie Borden
- Working Girls (2010 film), a Filipino remake of the 1984 film
- Working Girls (2020 film), a Belgian film directed by Frédéric Fonteyne and Anne Paulicevich
- The Working Girls, a 1974 American sexploitation film by Stephanie Rothman

=== Television ===
- Working Girl (TV series), a 1990 American sitcom adapted from the 1988 film
- Katherine Lynch's Working Girls, a 2008 Irish comedy series starring Katherine Lynch

==== Episodes ====
- "Working Girl" (Black-ish)
- "Working Girl" (Full House)
- "Working Girls" (Broad City)
- "Working Girls" (Game On)
- "Working Girls" (The Upper Hand)

== Music ==
- Working Girl (album), by Little Boots, 2015
- Working Girl (soundtrack), from the 1988 film, 1989
- "Working Girl", a song by Dolly Parton from 9 to 5 and Odd Jobs, 1980
- "Working Girl", a song by the Members from Uprhythm, Downbeat, 1982
- "Working Girl", a song by Train from A Girl, a Bottle, a Boat, 2017
- "Working Girls", a song by Redgum from Cut to the Quick, 1982

== See also ==
- Working Woman (disambiguation)
