= Working Woman =

A working woman is a woman in the workforce. Working Woman or Women may also refer to:

== Creative works ==
- Working Woman (film), a 2018 Israeli film
- Working Woman (magazine) (1976–2001), an American magazine
- "Working Woman" (song), a 1991 song by Rob Crosby
- Working Women (TV series), a 2023 Pakistani television series
- Working Woman (1927–1935), a newspaper and later magazine published by the Communist Party USA
- The Working Woman (Malayalam: Udhyogastha), a 1967 Indian film

== Organisations ==
- Working Women United (founded 1975), a United States women's rights organization
- Working Women's Association (1868–1869), a former United States association of working women
- Working Women's Forum (founded 1978), a women's organisation in India

== See also ==
- Working Girl (disambiguation)
- The Woman Worker (disambiguation)
- Working mother
