= Șeitin =

- Commune
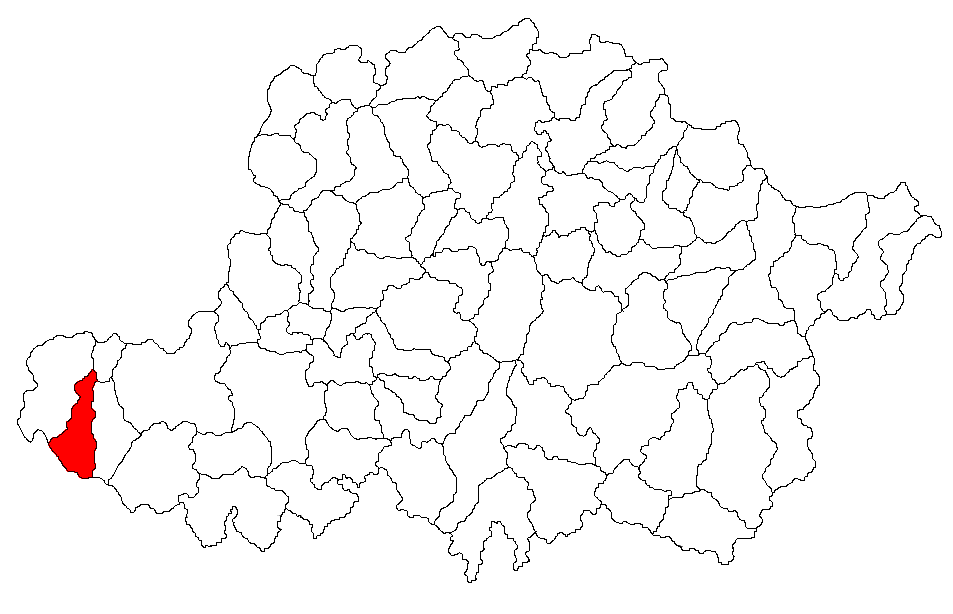
- Location in Arad County

- Location in Romania
- Coordinates: 46°06′N 20°51′E
- Country: Romania
- County: Arad
- Population (2021-12-01): 2,801
- Time zone: EET/EEST (UTC+2/+3)
- Vehicle reg.: AR

Șeitin (Hungarian: Sajtény) is a commune in western Romania, located in the southwest part of Arad County, is situated in the south-western part of the Arad Plateau, in the valley of the river Mureș, and it covers approximately 6680 ha. The commune is composed of a single village, Șeitin, situated at 47 km from Arad.

== Population ==
According to the last census, the population of the commune consists of about 2996 inhabitants, out of which 93.7% are Romanians, 0.9% Hungarians, 3.9% Roms, 0.7% Slovaks, 0.5% Ukrainians and 0.3% are of other or undeclared nationalities.

== History ==
Șeitin was first mentioned in documents in 1138. Archaeological excavations performed in the place called "La Imaș" have discovered traces of a Dacian-Roman settlement and a burial vault that prove the continuity of inhabitance on this area.

== Economy ==
The economy of the commune is mainly agrarian, and the locality is well known in the region as an important grain-bearing vegetable-growing place. Livestock-breeding is based on pig and cattle raising.

== Tourism ==
The natural park called "Lunca Mureșului" and the Mureș valley are the main sights of the commune.

== Natives ==
- Ioan T. Morar (born 1956), journalist, poet, dramatist, novelist, literary and art critic, and civil society activist.
