= Gay Film Nights =

LGBTQ film festival in Romania

- Date: September–November annually
- Locations: Cluj-Napoca, Romania
- Inaugurated: 2004
- Most recent: 17–25 November 2017

Gay Film Nights (Romanian: Serile Filmului Gay) film festival organised annually in Cluj-Napoca, Romania by the LGBT association Be An Angel. By presenting a series of films with LGBT themes, it seeks to showcase LGBT culture and cinema, while also initiating a dialogue with other members of society. The complete title of the event is Festivalul de Film "Serile Filmului Gay" (or "Gay Film Nights" Film Festival). The festival was first organised in 2004. Entry to the films is free.

The films shown at the Gay Film Nights are somewhat different from those shown as part of Bucharest's annual GayFest, which also includes a film festival. Gay Film Nights tends to be more mainstream and focussed on English-language films in its selection, while GayFest usually presents a greater number of documentaries and European productions, with a greater focus on LGBT rights.

Apart from the screening of films, Be An Angel also organises a number of other events during the Gay Film Nights festival. One of these is the Miss Travesty Romania contest which is open to drag and cross-dressing participants, intended to celebrate transsexual and transgender culture, and Mister Gay Romania.

Additionally, the Gay Film Nights includes a Gay Prize Gala, which seeks to recognise those who have contributed to LGBT culture and rights throughout the year, with prizes awarded in several categories.

== Gay Film Nights 2016 ==
Held 14 – 20 November 2016, Cluj-Napoca.

== Gay Film Nights 2014 ==
Held 10 – 16 November 2014, Cluj-Napoca.

== Gay Film Nights 2009 ==
Held 19 – 25 October 2009, Cluj-Napoca.

GAY FILM NIGHTS International Film Festival 2009 AWARDS

Best Short Film: Todas!!! (Spain)

Best Documentary: Transvestites also cry by Sebastiano d'Ayala Valva (France)

Best Feature Film: I Can't Think Straight (United Kingdom)

Public's Choice: My name is Love (Sweden)

== Gay Film Nights 2008 ==
Gay Film Nights 2008 took place between 13 and 19 October 2008, under the tagline of "The same people. The same ideals. Just in appearance different". It was the fifth edition of the festival.

Films:

Short Films

A Domicilio, Area X, Below the Belt, Benny's Gym, Fabulosity, FAIR Enough, Flores en el Parque, Just, Kaden, King County, Kompisar, Laundromat, Le Baiser, Mechanic's Daydream, Mother's Day, Postmortem, Premieren, Radu + Ana, Scarred, Signage, Secrets of the Mystic Oracle, The Offering, Thick Lips Thin Lips, Twirling Earl, Una última voluntad, Uncle Mike, Was is schon normal?

Feature Films

Butch Jamie, Coffee Date, East Side Story, Finn's Girl, Pusinky, The Gymnast

Documentaries

Campillo, Here's Looking at You, Boy, Red Without Blue, The Two Cubas, Voodoo Woman

== Gay Film Nights 2007 ==
Gay Film Nights 2007 took place between 15 and 21 October 2007, under the tagline of "Respect me the way I am!". The festival commemorated the fifth anniversary since the founding of Be An Angel, the festival's organiser. For the first time, the festival included photography exhibitions, a theatre performance and a Home Made Movies Contest, where amateur filmmakers were invited to create an LGBT-themed short film, of no more than 20 minutes, with a message of anti-discrimination or tolerance. The event was organised as part of the European Year of Equal Opportunities for All and was sponsored by KulturForum Europa.

Films shown in the 2007 Gay Film Nights were:

- Tan Lines (Australia)
- Surveillance (UK)
- Bob and Jack's 52-Year Adventure (USA)
- Vampire Diary (UK)
- Another Gay Movie (USA)
- FtF: Female to Femme (USA)
- The Birthday (Netherlands)
- Brother Outsider (USA)
- Friends in High Places (Germany)
- The short films Summer by Hong Khaou, Lucky Man by Dan Faltz, Sonntag Morgen by Beate Kunath, #01 hygienist by Beate Kunath and Backstroke by Amy Bronson

The Gay Prize Gala 2007 took place on September 29 at 22:00 at Club Angels, with the following recipients in the following categories:

- Person of the Year for supporting the Romanian LGBT community: Daniel Zavoian
- Prize for excellence: Neculai Constantin Munteanu
- Organisation of the Year for supporting the Romanian LGBT community: Be An Angel
- Prize for LGBT activism: Kenno
- Prize for the promotion of LGBT culture: Gay Film Nights
- Best medium of information for the LGBT community: Angelicuss Magazine
- Sexiest male: Răzvan Fodor
- Sexiest female: Monica Barladeanu
- The most popular drag queen in Romania: Toxice
- Gay song of the year: Prinde-mă, aprinde-mă by Andreea Bălan
- The most objective TV show with an LGBT theme: PRO TV Portret on PRO TV

The "black ball" was once again awarded to Gigi Becali, for his repeated anti-gay remarks.

== Gay Film Nights 2006 ==
Gay Film Nights 2006 was held between 25 and 30 September, and was the first festival to include short films (the short films shown were Highlanders Too, Toilet Treatments and Providence Dirt Newsreel). A different full-length film was shown each day at 19:00 at Club Angels, with five films shown in total (considering that the festival runs for five nights):

- Almost Normal (USA)
- Transamerica (USA)
- The Birdcage (USA)
- Boys Don't Cry (USA)
- Saving Face (USA/China)

Additionally, at 22:00 every night, a different LGBT party was held as part of the festival, including a karaoke night, a live music party and the Miss Travesty event on September 30.

The Gay Prize Gala 2006 took place on September 29 at 22:00 at Club Angels, with the following recipients in the following categories:

- Person of the Year for supporting the Romanian LGBT community: Alexandra Ungureanu
- Prize for LGBT activism: Romaniţa Iordache from Accept
- Prize for the promotion of LGBT culture: The Toxice musical band
- Best medium of information for the LGBT community: The GayOne.ro online magazine
- Sexiest male: Adrian Rosenberg
- Sexiest female: Alexandra Ungureanu
- The most popular drag queen in Romania: Kaballa Timişoara
- Gay song of the year: Viaţa mea by Cristina Rus
- The most objective TV show with an LGBT theme: Bomba zilei on OTV

The Gay Prize Gala also awarded a "black ball" to the politician Gigi Becali, for his anti-gay remarks and his virulent opposition to Bucharest's GayFest pride parade in June 2006.

== See also ==
- Be An Angel, the organiser of the event
- GayFest, Bucharest's annual gay culture event
- Gay rights in Romania
- List of LGBT film festivals

Film festivals in Cluj:

- Comedy Cluj
- Transilvania International Film Festival
