= Cuvântul (magazine) =

Romanian magazine

- Editor: Paul Cernat
- Categories: literary magazine, political magazine
- Frequency: Monthly
- First issue: January 1990
- Final issue: June 2009
- Company: Editura Cuvântul
- Country: Romania
- Based in: Bucharest
- Language: Romanian
- Website: cuvantul.ro

Cuvântul (Romanian pronunciation: [kuˈvɨntul], meaning "The Word") was a literary and political monthly, published in Bucharest, Romania. Tracing its origins back to 1990, it was successively edited by various figures in contemporary Romanian literature, among them Ioan T. Morar, Ioan Buduca, Radu G. Țeposu and Mircea Martin. Between 2008 and 2009, its editor in chief was literary critic Paul Cernat.

== History ==
Cuvântul was created as an independent review, one of several to emerge after the December 1989 Revolution toppled the Romanian communist regime. It counts as its immediate forerunner the political newspaper Opinia Studențească ("Student Opinion"), published in the last days of 1989, but rejects all association with Cuvântul, the far right newspaper of the interwar period. The first issue of Cuvântul magazine, originally a weekly, saw print in January 1990, and its first editorial staff comprised Morar, Lorin Vasilovici and Florin Pașnicu; since the twin issue 8-9/1990, they were replaced with Țeposu (as director), Buduca (editor in chief) and Dumitru Stan (editorial director, later replaced by George Țara). In 1993, the staff was again restructured: Țeposu kept his office as director, while Buduca became literary and artistic editor, and Mircea Țicudean was made the editor in chief.

Starting 1995, the magazine became a monthly. Its new series, carrying the subtitle Revistă de cultură ("Cultural Magazine"), had Țeposu for its director, Buduca as editorial director and critic Tudorel Urian as editor in chief. Since Țeposu's death in late 1999, Cuvântul pays him homage by mentioning him as "founding director" on the title page of each issue. Beginning with issues 3-4/2003, literary historian Mircea Martin was made senior editor, and gave the review its new editorial line, as explained during the first series of Cuvântul conferences; Buduca was at the time appointed editor in chief (replaced with Laura Albulescu in 2005, then Răzvan Țupa in 2006). The subtitle was changed to Revistă de cultură și atitudine ("Cultural and Opinion Magazine"). In 2006, however, Martin announced that tensions between himself and the management of Cuvântul's publishing company (Editura Cuvântul) caused the magazine to go on hold, and its editorial staff to resign. Martin and Laura Albulescu went on to establish a publishing venture, Editura Art. Their departure was received with regret by fellow literary magazines: Apostrof called Martin's edition of the review "splendid" and its conferences "exceptional"; in a later article for România Literară review, critic Ion Simuț referred to the Cuvântul conference cycle as "famous". The last conference held under Martin's management was dedicated to the work and legacy of interwar literary theorist E. Lovinescu.

In 2007, the magazine was published by the trio of Răzvan Țupa, Cosmin Perța and Teodor Dună, during which time its format grew to 48 pages. Beginning with issues 8-9/2008, Cuvântul inaugurated a third series, with Paul Cernat as editor in chief and the new subtitle Revistă de sinteză și orientare ("A Magazine of Synthesis and Orientation"). The change also brought a new conference cycle, which focused on the historical development of Romanian culture within its Central and Eastern European context, with such themes as the cultural history of Greater Romania, the regional spread of modernism, the characteristics of popular history in European countries, or the interwar intellectuals' support for eugenics and racism. In this context, the magazine also launched the book collection ADDENDA Cuvântul.

Cuvântul's new projects were touched by controversy in 2008, when researcher Sorin Antohi became involved in its "Greater Romania" conference. At the time, other press venues published revelations that Antohi had falsified some of his academic credentials, and that he had been, in his youth, an informer of the communist secret police (the Securitate). In his column for Șapte Seri magazine, Răzvan Țupa noted that, based on such revelations, Cuvântul would discontinue its relationship with Antohi, and suggested that the infiltration of "sad Securitate people" on the review's staff was equivalent to the interwar Cuvântul having become a mouthpiece for the fascist Iron Guard.
