= Next Top Model (Romanian TV series) =

- Genre: Reality television
- Created by: Tyra Banks
- Presented by: Cătălin Botezatu
- Judges: Cătălin Botezatu; Gabriel Hennessey; Laurent Tourette; Liviu Ionescu; Mirela Vescan
- Opening theme: "Beware" - Joy Enriquez
- Country of origin: Romania
- No. of seasons: 3
- No. of episodes: 41

Production
- Executive producers: Mihaela Nutu; Vlad Sterescu
- Running time: 120 mins

Original release
- Network: Antena 1
- Release: February 3, 2011 – December 27, 2012

Next Top Model by Cătălin Botezatu is a Romanian reality television series that aired on Antena 1 from 3 February 2011, to 27 December 2012. The show, hosted by Romanian fashion designer and television personality Cătălin Botezatu, was based on Tyra Banks' America's Next Top Model and aimed to discover Romania's next top fashion model. Over the course of three seasons, contestants competed for a modeling contract with MRA Models, valued at €70,000, while competing in a number of local and international photo shoots and fashion challenges. After its cancellation, Botezatu launched a similar competition, Supermodels by Cătălin Botezatu, on Kanal D in 2015.

== History ==
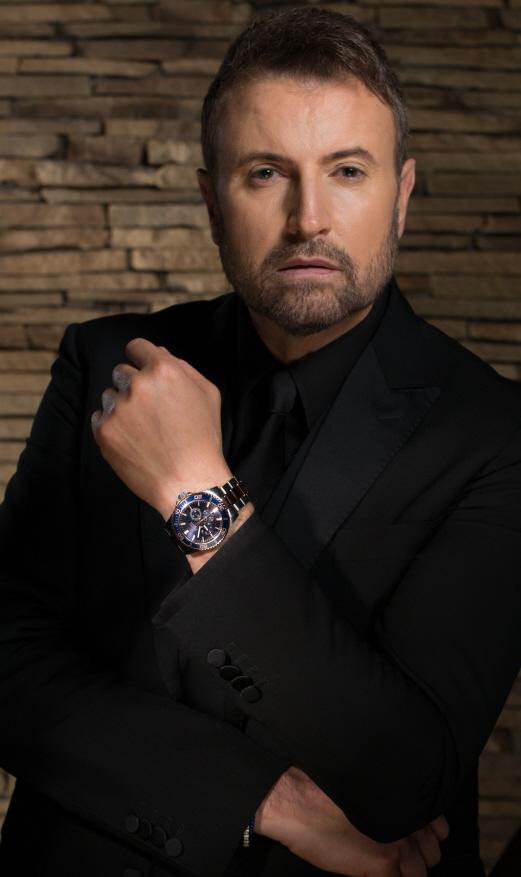
Host and head judge Cătălin Botezatu.

Next Top Model premiered on 3 February 2011, on Antena 1, with designer Cătălin Botezatu serving as host and head judge. The original judging panel also included photographer Gabriel Hennessey, makeup artist Mirela Vescan, hairstylist Laurent Tourette, and modeling agent Liviu Ionescu. The series followed the format of America's Next Top Model, featuring aspiring models competing for a contract with MRA Models and other career opportunities.

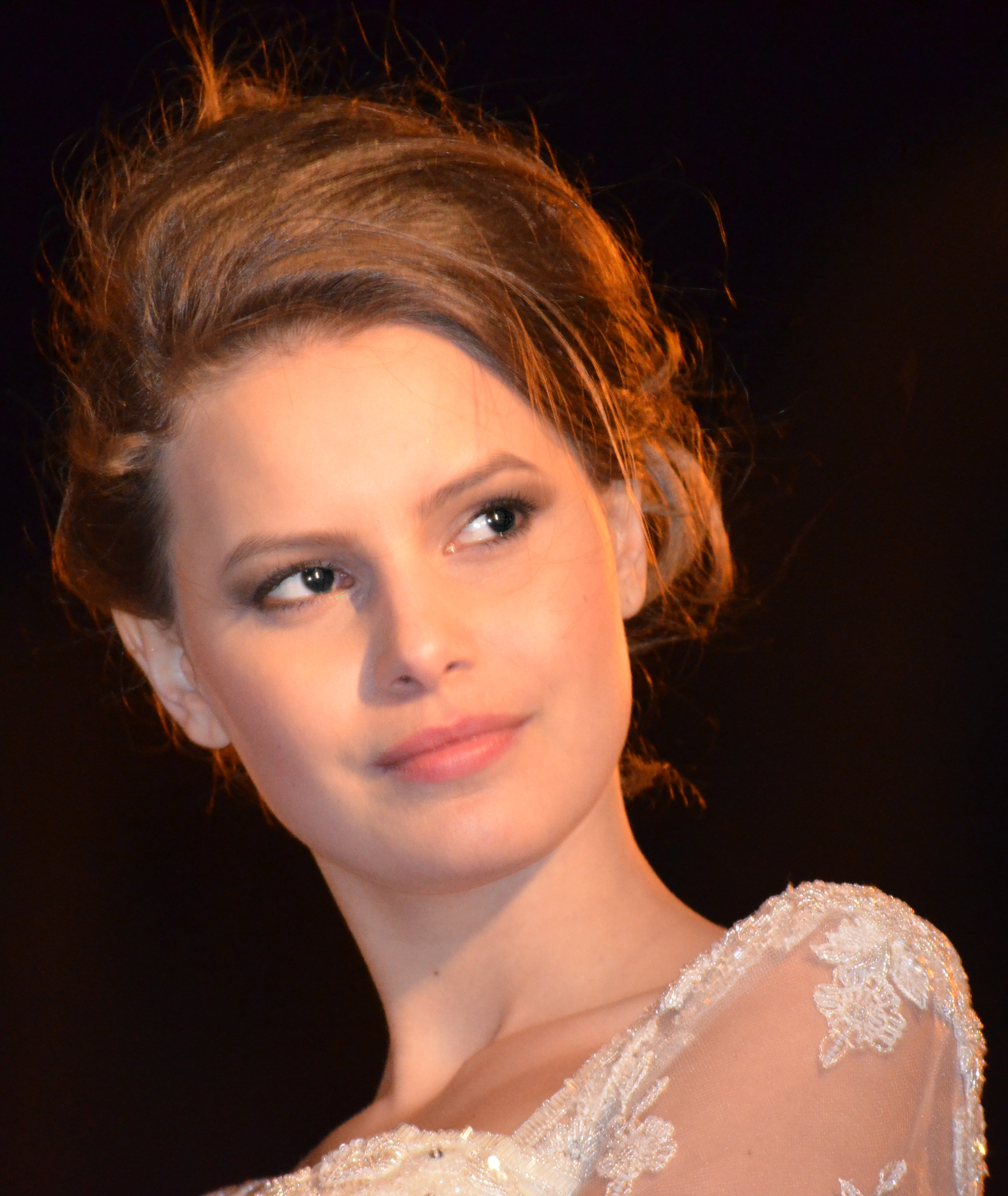
Season 1 winner Emma Dumitrescu, March 2012.

The first season featured twelve contestants selected from thousands of applicants. The competition included international photo shoots in Egypt, Finland, the United Arab Emirates, and France. Sixteen-year-old Emma Dumitrescu won the season, receiving a €50,000 cash prize in addition to the modeling contract. Despite a mild initial reception, the show was renewed for a second season.

The second season premiered on 15 September 2011, with an increased prize package of €70,000 and an expanded cast of 16 contestants. The minimum age requirement was lowered from 16 to 14, allowing younger aspiring models to participate. Casting events took place across multiple cities and towns in Romania and neighboring Moldova. The season featured shoots and challenges in Iceland, Turkey, and Tunisia. Fourteen-year-old Laura Giurcanu was chosen as the winner, becoming the youngest in the show’s history.

The third and final season premiered on 20 September 2012, maintaining the same prize package and participation requirements. This season marked the show’s peak in popularity, with a record number of applicants and expanded opportunities for hopefuls to submit their photos online. The competition took place in Romania, Greece, Cyprus, and Turkey. The winner was 22-year-old Ramona Popescu.

Following the conclusion of the third season, Cătălin Botezatu stepped away from the project due to personal matters, leading to the show's cancellation. In 2015, he launched a similar modeling competition, Supermodels by Cătălin Botezatu, on Kanal D. This new show featured both male and female contestants and was inspired by Naomi Campbell’s The Face franchise, but retained much of the same production team and guest stars from Next Top Model.

== Format ==
There were several notable differences between Next Top Model and the American adaptation. One key distinction was the lower age limit for contestants, with some as young as 14 eligible to participate.

The competition's premise also differed, with the introduction of model "passports" that were given to all semifinalists at the beginning of each season. These passports contained a list of "checkpoints" that contestants needed to complete in order to win. The first checkpoint was passed when contestants made it past the audition stage into the semifinals, the second when they were selected for the final cast, and the third when they won the modeling contract with MRA.

In contrast to the American version, the Romanian series was more liberal with international travel. Rather than living together in a house, contestants traveled between luxury hotels and resorts in exotic locations in Europe, North Africa and the Middle East where they would visit a variety of UNESCO World Heritage Sites. This allowed the show to allocate more of its budget toward filming in these scenic destinations, but meant the show's photo shoots were typically low budget, relying on a small team of two to three regular photographers, along with occasional guest photographers.

Many shoots focused on glamour modeling, and runway segments—central to the competition and judging—reflected the host's background as a designer. Each episode typically showcased a runway segment featuring the host's designs.

== Seasons ==
Season	Premiere date	Winner	Runner-up	Other contestants in order of elimination	Number of contestants	International destinations
1	3 February 2011	Emma Dumitrescu	Mădălina Barbu	Anca Vasile, Diana Donoiu, Sara Măgurean, Adela Neagu, Lucia Popa (disqualified), Inga Ojog, Otilia Pană, Alexandra Băbăscu, Laura Dumitru, Roxana Cristian	12	Karnak; Giza; Rovaniemi; Dubai; Paris
2	15 September 2011	Laura Giurcanu	Iuliana Mînza	Miruna Iovan & Iasmina Balamat, Mădălina Goian, Cristina Chiriac, Denisa Hîncu, Gina Tănasie, Simona Din & Aida Becheanu, Flori Ciupu, Iulia Micloș, Diana Trofin, Irina Batrac, Karin Arz, Sandra Ciubotariu	16	Reykjavík; Istanbul; Pamukkale; Selçuk; Tunis; El Djem; Sidi Bou Said; Carthage; Matmata
3	20 September 2012	Ramona Popescu	Barbara Langellotti & Denisa Ciocoiu	Veronica Cazac (quit), Silvana Anghel, Diana Luca & Bianca Taban, Andreea Grecu, Ruxandra Postatny, Victoria Cartiră, Diana Zamfir & Alexandra Urs, Sânziana Cozorici, Otilia Cioșă, Lavinia Furtună, Laura Iordache & Cristina Iordache	17	Mykonos; Paphos; Cappadocia

== Criticism and controversy ==
The contestants' behavior on Next Top Model sometimes generated controversy, particularly during the first and second seasons. In season one, Lucia Popa was disqualified after a physical altercation 16-year-old Emma Dumitrescu. In season two, Irina Batrac was targeted by pranks from fellow contestants but received no support from production during the incidents.

The subject matter of some photo shoots was also criticized, with concerns raised about the appropriateness of certain themes for younger contestants, some of whom were as young as 14 and participated in shoots associated with sensuality.

In season two, several contestants faced backlash for significant weight gain during filming, including 21-year-old Iulia Miclos, who was eliminated partly due to her weight. In response, host Cătălin Botezatu emphasized in season three that models who gained more than six kilograms (approximately 13 pounds) would be at risk of elimination if they did not maintain their figures. This policy became particularly relevant in the case of Lavinia Furtună, who was consistently critiqued for being unable to fit into garments, ultimately leading to her elimination.

Throughout the show’s run, there were several reports of fainting incidents, particularly in season three. One such incident involved 23-year-old Laura Iordache, who collapsed during a shoot due to illness. Her sister later revealed that Iordache had been engaging in crash dieting to meet the show's requirements.

== See also ==
- America's Next Top Model
- Supermodels by Cătălin Botezatu
