= Observator Cultural =

Romanian magazine focused on culture

Observator Cultural (meaning "The Cultural Observer" in English) is a weekly literary magazine based in Bucharest, Romania. The magazine was started in 2000. The weekly publishes articles on Romania's cultural and arts scene as well as political affairs.

== See also ==
- List of magazines in Romania
