= Maria Flechtenmacher =

Romanian writer (1838–1888)

Maria Flechtenmacher (born Maria Mavrodin; 1838–1888) was a Romanian writer, publicist and pedagogue.

Her parents were Costache and Anica Mavrodin. She was educated in private girls schools. In 1850–1853, she was active as an actress, and after her marriage to the composer Alexandru Flechtenmacher, she continued as a teacher in declamation at the Elena Doamna. In 1871, she published her own poems, Poezii şi proză. From 1878 to 1881, she was the editor of the women's magazine Femeia and a spokesperson for women's rights.
