= Switch (Romanian magazine) =

- Editor: Lucian Dunăreanu (1st and 2nd issue)
- Categories: LGBT magazine
- Frequency: monthly
- First issue: July 1, 2005
- Final issue: 2006
- Company: SC ContraAD SRL with Be An Angel
- Country: Romania
- Based in: Cluj-Napoca
- Language: Romanian and English section
- Website: www.revistaswitch.ro (currently defunct)
- ISSN: 1841-4362

Switch was a Romanian LGBT magazine. Switch was the first commercial glossy magazine for the LGBT community in Romania.

The first issue of Switch was released on July 1, 2005, and dealt extensively with the organisation of Romania's first gay pride parade, as part of Bucharest's annual GayFest. A second issue was released in September and the 3 in January 2006 by Andrei Pop (without Be An Angel)

The Switch Magazine was an LGBT magazine published by SC.ContraAD.SRL (with Michael Labelle as publisher/director. Switch is the successor of Angelicuss Magazine (the first LGBT newsletter from Romania). Switch had 40 color pages and was distributed with pay by the national distribution network. After the first two numbers edited in Cluj-Napoca by the team led by Lucian Dunareanu (chief editor), executive head manager of Be An Angel Romania (the majority of the team members being working journalists with specialized studies), Michael Labelle moved to Bucharest following Andrei Pop's proposal to make the Switch Magazine together without the help of Be An Angel. Though the first Bucharest based issue was well received, there was never enough community support or advertising revenue to make it a viable enterprise, and thus the first of the Bucharest-based edition of Switch was also the last.
