= Promenada Mall (Bucharest) =

Coordinates: 44°28′41″N 26°06′12″E

- Interactive map of the Promenada Mall (Bucharest) area

General information
- Location: Bucharest, Romania
- Construction started: January 2012
- Inaugurated: 17 October 2013
- Owner: NEPI Rockcastle

Height
- Top floor: 2

Technical details
- Floor count: 6

Other information
- Parking: 1300

Website
- official website

Promenada Mall Bucharest is a shopping center located in Romania. It was developed by investment firm Raiffeisen Evolution and inaugurated on 17 October 2013, after a 130 million euro investment. Promenada is the first mall opened in bucharest after the financial crisis in 2007–2009, construction began in January 2012 and lasted 22 months.

The shopping center includes the businesses Carrefour Market, CCC, Help Net, Hervis, Burger King, Zara, Samsung, H&M, Altex, KFC, Intersport, Deichmann, ISTYLE, McDonald's, C&A and Peek & Cloppenburg.

Promenada Mall, in Bucharest, won the first prize in the category "Mixed solutions" at the first edition of the Rigips Trophy România.

În November 2013, the shopping center was purchased by investment firm NEPI.

== Facilities ==
Promenada Mall contains over 1.300 parking spots and 150 bike spots. The shopping center has 6 floors – two floors of underground parking, one floor which contains stores and is also underground, as well as three others which are overground – the last one being dedicated to restaurants and coffee shops. The surface of the terrace is of 7.000 mp. The shopping center is situated in the north, in Sector 1, also named „mall of the corporates" due to being located near many multinational office buildings.
