= Cronica Veche =

- Frequency: Monthly
- Founded: 1966
- Website: cronicaveche.wordpress.com
- ISSN: 1220-4560

Cronica Veche (The Old Chronicle) is a Romanian literary magazine, based in Iași. It appeared in 1966 as Cronica (The Chronicle), and changed its name in 2011.
