= Viața Medicală =

Romanian weekly medical magazine

Viaţa Medicală
- Editor: Viaţa Medicală Romaneasca
- Frequency: Weekly
- Founded: 1989
- Website: www.viata-medicala.ro
- ISSN: 1583-8862

Viața Medicală (Medical Life) is a Romanian weekly medical magazine, which publishes medical news, commentaries, and peer-reviewed medical articles.
