= Beau Monde =

Fashion magazine in the Netherlands

- Categories: Lifestyle
- First issue: February 1995; 30 years ago
- Company: Pijper Media
- Country: Netherlands
- Language: Dutch

Beau Monde is a Dutch language monthly glamour and lifestyle magazine published in Amsterdam, Netherlands. The phrase "Beau monde", also used in English, means fashionable society. Beau Monde is published out of the Pijper Media offices in Amsterdam and Groningen. It targets women between 21 and 45 years of age. The magazine organizes an annual "Beau Monde Award".

== History ==
Beau Monde was established in 1995. The magazine was initially published by Sanoma. In 2001, Sanoma Hearst founded a magazine under the same name in Romania that has folded since. Pijper Media acquired the Dutch magazine in April 2016.

Beau Monde's editor-in-chief in 2015 was Ellen Litz. In 2023 it is Annelies Pijper.
