= Supermodels (Romanian TV series) =

- Genre: Reality television
- Presented by: Cătălin Botezatu
- Judges: Cătălin Botezatu; Gabriel Hennessey; Laurent Tourette; Marius Baragan
- Country of origin: Romania
- No. of episodes: 16

Original release
- Network: Kanal D
- Release: February 6 – April 24, 2015

Supermodels by Cătălin Botezatu was a Romanian reality documentary and modeling competition hosted by designer Catalin Botezatu. Prior to hosting the show, Botezatu was the host of the Romanian adaptation of Tyra Banks' America's Next Top Model.

After suffering from an illness the year after the filming of the third cycle of Next Top Model, the show entered a hiatus. Ultimately, Botezatu abandoned his role as head judge of the show, effectively cancelling the program. Shortly after his departure, Botezatu took on the role of head judge and host on Supermodels. Supermodels more closely derives its format from The Face.

The winner, Cătălin Bucur & Gabriela Prisacariu, received a contract with PackBackAge Concept Agency in Paris.

== Show premise ==
At the start of the series, each contestant was placed on an individual team. Each week, the contestants participated in a challenge, followed by a photo shoot. After the shoot, one team was granted immunity, while two contestants from the losing teams were put up for elimination. The judges then determined which contestant would leave the competition. Around two-thirds of the way through the season, the format changed—no team was saved from elimination. Instead, the judges nominated multiple contestants and voted on which of them to eliminate.

== Cast ==
=== Contestants ===
(Ages stated are at start of contest)

Contestant	Age	Hometown	Team		Finish	Place
George Mencu	25	Turda	—		Episode 2	18-17
Anca Marin	22	Buzău	—		Episode 2	18-17
Alexandru Lepadatu	—	—	Green		Episode 3	16
Ivan Vlad	19	Bucharest	Blue		Episode 5	15
Claudia Tomozei	22	Gârleni	Blue		Episode 7	14
Andreea Negrea	20	Timișoara	Green		Episode 9	13
Dan Dumitru	30	Bucharest	Blue		Episode 10	12
Dragoș Vasile	20	Craiova	Blue	Green	Episode 12	11
Carmen Cimpeanu	19	Calafat	Pink		Episode 12	10
Laura Dinca	18	Constanța	Pink		Episode 13	9
Alexandru Mildner	22	Bucharest	Green		Episode 14	8
Gilbert Costache	27	Bucharest	Pink		Episode 15	7
Mădălina Petrean	17	Arad	Blue	Pink	Episode 15	6
Joan Goga	20	Cluj-Napoca	Pink		Episode 16	5-4
Andrada Statie	20	Târgu Jiu	Green		Episode 16	5-4
Liana Coman	22	Târgu Mureș	Green		Episode 16	3
Gabriela Prisacariu	21	Bucharest	Green		Episode 16	1
Cătălin Bucur	22	Baia Sprie	Pink		Episode 16	1

=== Judges ===
- Cătălin Botezatu
- Gabriel Hennessey
- Laurent Tourette
- Marius Baragan

== Episodes ==
No. overall	No. in season	Title	Original release date
1	1	"Episode 1"	6 February 2015
2	2	"Episode 2"	13 February 2015
3	3	"Episode 3"	20 February 2015
4	4	"Episode 4"	27 February 2015
5	5	"Episode 5"	6 March 2015
6	6	"Episode 6"	13 March 2015
7	7	"Episode 7"	20 March 2015
8	8	"Episode 8"	27 March 2015
9	9	"Episode 9"	3 April 2015
10	10	"Episode 10"	3 April 2015
11	11	"Episode 11"	10 April 2015
12	12	"Episode 12"	10 April 2015
13	13	"Episode 13"	17 April 2015
14	14	"Episode 14"	17 April 2015
15	15	"Episode 15"	24 April 2015
16	16	"Episode 16"	24 April 2015

== Results ==
Team Blue	Team Green	Team Pink

Place	Contestant	Episodes											
Place	Contestant	3 (Note: Episodes 1-2 were casting episodes.)	5	7	9	10 (Note: In episode 10, the blue team was dissolved. Dragos and Madalina, who were the last remaining members of that team, each joined one of the other remaining teams.)	11 (Note: In episode 11, there was no elimination.)	12 (Note: In episode 12, Dragos was eliminated outside of judging panel.)	13 (Note: In episode 13, no team was safe from elimination. Alexandru M. and Liana from the green team & Joan and Laura from the pink team were in the bottom four. The panel deliberation ended in a tie to eliminate either Alexandru or Laura. Catalin broke the tie and chose to eliminate Laura.)	14 (Note: In episode 14, Alexandru M., Gilbert and Madalina were in the bottom three. The judges, only two of whom were present, voted unanimously to eliminate Alexandru.)	15 (Note: In episode 15, Catalin, Gilbert, Joan, and Madalina were in danger of elimination. The judges agreed on eliminating Gilbert and Madalina. The teams were dissolved at the end of the episode.)	16	
1-2	Cătălin	WIN	IN	IN	IN	IN	IN	IN	IN	IN	LOW	IN	WINNER
1-2	Gabriela	IN	WIN	WIN	IN	WIN	IN	WIN	IN	IN	IN	IN	WINNER
3	Liana	IN	WIN	WIN	IN	WIN	IN	WIN	LOW	IN	IN	IN	OUT
4-5	Andrada	IN	WIN	WIN	IN	WIN	LOW	WIN	IN	IN	IN	OUT	
4-5	Joan	WIN	IN	IN	LOW	IN	IN	LOW	LOW	IN	LOW	OUT	
6-7	Mădălina	IN	IN	IN	WIN	IN	IN	IN	IN	LOW	OUT		
6-7	Gilbert	WIN	IN	IN	IN	IN	IN	IN	IN	LOW	OUT		
8	Alexandru M.	IN	WIN	WIN	IN	WIN	IN	WIN	LOW	OUT			
9	Laura	WIN	LOW	IN	IN	LOW	IN	IN	OUT				
10	Carmen	WIN	IN	LOW	IN	IN	LOW	OUT					
11	Dragoș	IN	IN	IN	WIN	IN	LOW	OUT					
12	Dan	LOW	IN	IN	WIN	OUT							
13	Andreea	IN	WIN	WIN	OUT								
14	Claudia	IN	IN	OUT									
15	Ivan	IN	OUT										
16	Alexandru L.	OUT											

The contestant was part of the winning team for the episode.
The contestant was in danger of elimination.
The contestant was eliminated from the competition.
The contestant was eliminated outside of judging panel.
The contestant won the competition.

=== Photo shoots ===
- Episode 4 photo shoots: Makeovers; nude on the beach
- Episode 5 photo shoot: Fear factor in a bathtub
- Episode 8 photo shoot: Royalty in Romanescu Park
- Episode 10 photo shoot: Hanging from a skyscraper
- Episode 11 photo shoot: Garbage couture
- Episode 12 photo shoot: Covered in paint and powder
- Episode 13 photo shoot: Posing on stilts in B&W
- Episode 14 photo shoots: Buried inside a coffin; bats hanging upside down
- Episode 15 photo shoots: James Bond couture on a rooftop; bright designs in a cave
- Episode 16 photo shoots: Lingerie and underwear in a casino

== See also ==
- The Face
- Next Top Model by Cătălin Botezatu
