= Angelicuss =

Romanian LGBT magazine

- Editor: Lucian Dunăreanu
- Categories: LGBT magazine
- Frequency: weekly
- First issue: November 2004
- Company: Be An Angel
- Country: Romania
- Language: Romanian
- Website: www.angelicuss.beanangel.ro

Angelicuss is the first Romanian LGBT magazine and is published by Be An Angel, an LGBT rights organisation from Cluj-Napoca. The magazine was initially only available through the internet, with the first print version released in November 2004 and distributed free of charge. In 2005, the magazine was replaced by Switch, also released by Be An Angel. In 2006, however, Switch was discontinued and replaced by a revamped Angelicuss, released in the format of a weekly newsletter. From June 2007, Angelicuss have too a daily update online version.

The editor of Angelicuss is Lucian Dunăreanu.

== See also ==
- List of magazines in Romania
