= Academia Cațavencu =

Romanian satirical magazine

- Type: Weekly pamphlet newspaper
- Format: Compact
- Owner: România liberă
- Editor: Doru Bușcu
- Founded: 1991
- Headquarters: Bulevardul Regina Elisabeta 7-9, etaj 6, sector 3, Bucharest, Romania
- ISSN: 1221-5597
- Website: academiacatavencu.info

Academia Cațavencu (Romanian pronunciation: [akadeˈmi.a kat͡saˈveŋku], "The Cațavencu Academy") is a Romanian satirical magazine founded in 1991 and made famous by its investigative journalism. Academia Cațavencu also owns Radio Guerrilla , an FM radio station with national coverage ; Tabu, a women's magazine, Superbebe, a magazine for new parents, Aventuri la pescuit, a magazine for fishermen, 24-FUN, a free magazine for teenagers, and Cotidianul, a daily newspaper.

In a surprise move, on May 29, 2006, Academia Cațavencu press group announced it was being acquired by Realitatea Media, owners of Realitatea TV, and controlled by controversial and elusive businessman Sorin Ovidiu Vântu. Vântu himself has often been a target of enquiries by Cațavencu journalists.

== Name ==
Nae Cațavencu is a character in Ion Luca Caragiale's 1883 comedy O scrisoare pierdută ("A Lost Letter"). An unscrupulous, demagogue politician, Cațavencu uses his newspaper Răcnetul Carpaților ("The Yell of the Carpathians") to blackmail politicians of the opposing party with a compromising love letter that he finds.

== History ==
In its current form, Academia Cațavencu was founded in 1991, by a team of humourists, investigators, and literates headed by poet and former dissident Mircea Dinescu. Part of the team had previously edited two short-lived satirical papers, Cațavencu Incomod and Cațavencu Internațional.

Dinescu was editor-in-chief until 1998, when he resigned and went on to create his own publications, Aspirina săracului ("The poor man's aspirin" – a joking reference to sexual intercourse), and Plai cu boi (Land of the Dumb), a monthly satirical magazine parodying the style of Playboy.

== Current activities ==
Cațavencu Internațional, 1990

Academia Cațavencu have been long-time press freedom advocates. They maintain a "press monitoring agency", a watchdog against manipulation through mass-media.

During the 2004 election campaign, Academia Cațavencu published as supplements two parody issues of Scânteia (the old-time Romanian Communist Party newspaper), containing reprints of articles written by important current day politicians during the Communist era. Almost 40,000 copies were bought in bulk from newsagents, along with other newspapers. The alleged perpetrators were representatives of the then-governing Social Democratic Party (PSD), whose (mostly former Communist) high members (including founder and former President of Romania Ion Iliescu) were protagonists of the Cațavencu special issues.

Apart from political issues, Academia Cațavencu organises and/or sponsors a number of cultural and environmental initiatives:

- Save the Danube Delta
- Save Vama Veche
- Cu papucii prin deșert ("Across the Desert in slippers", a reference to the Dacia car hatchback model) – a humanitarian expedition through the Sahara and down to Senegal

They also develop their own stereotypes and nicknames of the politicians, such as:

- Ion Iliescu "Nelu Cotrocelu" or "Bunicuța" ("The Granny") – associated with the Cotroceni Palace owl
- Adrian Năstase "Bombonel" ("Candy Boy") – in reference to his alleged homosexuality
- Traian Băsescu "Popeye Marinarul" ("Popeye the Sailor") – due to Băsescu's former job as a commercial navy captain
- Theodor Stolojan "The robot", "Robocop" or "Frankie" – due to his voice and comic resemblance to the classic image of Frankenstein's monster
- Petre Roman – suggests that he is rather popular among the female workers of the APACA textile factory in Bucharest (whom they reported shouting once: Nu vrem bani! Nu vrem valută! Vrem pe Roman să ne fută! ("We don't want money! We don't want hard currency! We want Roman to fuck us!").
- Gheorghe Dumitrașcu – suggests that he washes infrequently
- Nicolae Văcăroiu "Votcăroiu" – allegedly heavy drinker of "Săniuța", a low-grade brand of vodka (votcă)
- Șerban Mihăilescu "Miki Șpagă" ("Mickey Bribe") – corruption allegations
- Marian Vanghelie – he has poor grammatical skills, as coined by Vanghelie's frequent and indiscriminate use of Care este ("Which is"), as a predicate for singular and plural subjects alike.

== See also ==
- Le Canard enchaîné, a French counterpart
- The Clinic, a Chilean counterpart
- Frank, a Canadian counterpart
- El Jueves, a Spanish counterpart
- Moskovskaya Komsomolka, a Russian counterpart
- NJUZ, a Serbian counterpart
- Noseweek, a South African counterpart
- The Onion, a US counterpart
- Private Eye, a British counterpart
- The Phoenix, an Irish counterpart
- Titanic, a German counterpart

== See also ==
- List of magazines in Romania
