= Toxice =

Romanian drag queen band

Toxice is the first drag queen band submitting the Romanian national preselection at Eurovision Song Contest 2006. The band is composed of: Divina Duvall (ex Luciana Duvall), Alehandra del Barrio, Fernanda and Bella Blue. The slogan of Toxice is that "Drag queen is an art and has nothing to do with sexual orientation".

== See also ==
- List of drag groups
