= Dolgozó nő =

Women's magazine in Romania

- Categories: Women's magazine
- Frequency: Monthly
- Founded: 1945
- Final issue: 1989
- Country: Communist Romania
- Based in: Cluj-Napoca
- Language: Hungarian

Dolgozó nő (Hungarian pronunciation: [ˈdolɡozoː ˈnøː], Hungarian: The Woman Worker) was a monthly illustrated women's magazine which was published in Cluj-Napoca, Communist Romania, between 1945 and 1989. It was the sole publication targeting Hungarian women in the country.

== History and profile ==
Dolgozó nő was established in Cluj in 1945. The magazine came out monthly and was printed in Hungarian. It was the sister publication of Femeia, a Romanian women's magazine.

Dolgozó nő targeted Hungarian women living in Romania who were the members of the Communist women’s mass organization, the Union of Antifascist Women of Romania. It was modelled on Soviet women's magazines and featured articles on women's rights, their condition in the modern society, health, beauty, housework, literature and fashion topics. It also encouraged the participation of women in politics and covered materials on literature and history.

Dolgozó nő folded in 1989 when the Communist regime fell as a result of the Romanian Revolution.
