= Femeia =

Women's magazine in Romania

- in 2008
- Categories: Women's magazine
- Frequency: Monthly
- Publisher: Sanoma Hearst Romania
- Founded: 1878
- Country: Romania
- Based in: Bucharest
- Language: Romanian

Femeia (Romanian: The Woman) is a women's magazine in Romania which was established in 1878. From 1946 on, it served as one of the propaganda publications of the Communist regime. The title was acquired and restarted by the Finnish media company Sanoma in 2006 as a mainstream women's magazine.

== History and profile ==
Founded in 1878, Femeia has adopted different political stances. These can be divided into three headings, as follows:

=== Feminist magazine ===
The magazine was started in Bucharest in 1878 under the title Femeia română: ziarul social, literar şi casnic (Romanian woman: A social, literary, and domestic magazine). Its founders were a group of women led by Maria Flechtenmacher. The magazine adopted a feminist approach, making it one of the early Romanian publications focusing on women. The magazine's slogan was Libertate prin lumină! (Romanian: Liberty through Light).

It reported significant events for women, including the First International Congress of Women's Rights held in Paris in 1878. It was one of the supporters of the establishment of women's associations in the United Principalities of Moldavia and Wallachia. The Romanian novelist Sofia Nădejde was among the notable contributors to the magazine, which came out twice per week until 1881 and produced 230 issues during this period.

=== Communist magazine ===
The magazine was renamed Femeia Muncitoare (Romanian: The Working Woman) in 1946, becoming one of the propaganda periodicals of the Communist government. It was attached to the National Council of Women and frequently reported the women-related decisions of the Communist Party. It also featured articles on women's rights, their condition in the modern society, health, beauty, housework, literature and fashion topics. The magazine came out monthly. It had a sister publication entitled Dolgozó nő which was printed in Hungarian language.

Femeia fulfilled its propagandistic role until the 1990s, along with Săteanca (Romanian: The Country Woman), targeting women. It was an imitation of the Soviet women's magazine Rabotnitsa in terms of its content, layout, and strict communist ideology as late as 1960. Over time, Femeia developed its own political stance and design, which were a reflection of the changes in the ideology of the Romanian Communist Party. Thus, the magazine supported much softer communist ideology between 1960 and 1965. Femeia focused on cosmopolitism from 1965 to 1972 but then returned to its former stance, a softer communist ideology, in the period between 1972 and 1979. It adopted a much stricter communist stance from 1980 to 1989.

=== Mainstream women's magazine ===
The license for Femeia was acquired by Sanoma in 2006, and it was restarted as a monthly magazine. Its target audience is women aged between 25 and 45, and the magazine mostly features articles on fashion, beauty, home decoration, and hobbies. Sanoma Hearst Romania, publisher of the magazine, claimed 459,000 readers for Femeia in 2008.
