= Be An Angel =

LGBT organization in Romania

Logo of Be An Angel Romania

Be An Angel Romania (BAAR) is a Romanian human rights organisation based in Cluj-Napoca founded by Lucian Dunăreanu, an LGBT rights activist. Although the organisation's mission is to combat discrimination in Romanian society in all its forms, its main field of activity is in LGBT rights and dealing with discrimination on the basis of sexual orientation.

Since 2004, Be An Angel has also organised the annual Gay Film Nights festival in Cluj-Napoca, which seeks to promote LGBT culture and cinema. The 2007 festival was held between October 15 and October 21. Gay Film Nights includes a Gay Prize Gala (Gala Premiilor Gay in Romanian), with prizes awarded in various fields, such as LGBT activism, the best gay publication and the most LGBT-friendly public personality in Romania. The Gay Prize Gala also includes a "black ball" section, awarded to the most homophobic or anti-gay public personality in Romania. In 2006, the black ball was awarded to Gigi Becali for his homophobic remarks and virulent opposition to the Bucharest GayFest pride parade.

== See also ==
- Angelicuss
- LGBT rights in Romania
- ACCEPT, the largest LGBT rights organisation in the country
