= Șapte Seri =

Şapte Seri ("Seven Evenings") is a free leaflet-sized weekly magazine about goings-on in Bucharest, Romania. It is written largely in Romanian with some English.

== History and profile ==
The magazine first appeared on 12 June 1998, in 16 pages, full-color, with 17,000 copies, and was distributed in approximately 60 places. The distribution list included cinemas, clubs, bars, restaurants, cinemas, healthcare centers, business centres, hotels, etc.

Șapte Seri is aimed at a wide variety of readers: residents and tourists, men, women, active persons, who spend their spare time going out.

By March 2000, the circulation had grown to 30,000. It has now reached 60,000, audited by BRAT, with readership data published in the SNA (National Audience Study).

In the summer period (June to August), the magazine is also distributed at the seaside, in a 2-in-1 format with double covers.

Even though the magazine is printed in Romanian, the website is fully translated into English, making it useful for expats.
